= USS Alexandria =

USS Alexandria may refer to the following ships of the United States Navy:

- USS Alexandria (1862), was a paddle steamer commissioned in 1862 and sold in 1865
- USS Alexandria (PF-18), was a Tacoma-class patrol frigate
- USS Alexandria (SSN-757), is a Los Angeles-class submarine commissioned in 1991 and currently in service
