= USS Gulfport =

USS Gulfport has been the name of two ships in the United States Navy.

- USS Gulfport (AK-5) was a German vessel that was seized by the United States upon its entrance into World War I.
- USS Gulfport (PF-20), a Tacoma-class frigate.
