= Gulfport =

Gulfport may refer to:

== Places in USA ==
- Gulfport, Florida
- Gulfport, Illinois
- Gulfport, Mississippi

== Ships ==
- USS Gulfport, two ships of this name
- SS Gulfport, a Hansa A Type cargo ship in service 1947-64
- Gulfport was a prospective name for USNS David C. Shanks (T-AP-180)

== Other uses ==
- Gulfport station, a former train station in Gulfport, Mississippi, now a museum
- Gulfport (Staten Island Railway station), in New York
- Gulfport High School, in Gulfport, Mississippi
- Gulfport Open, a former PGA tournament played in Gulfport, Mississippi in the 1940s
