= USS Grand Island =

Tacoma-class patrol frigate

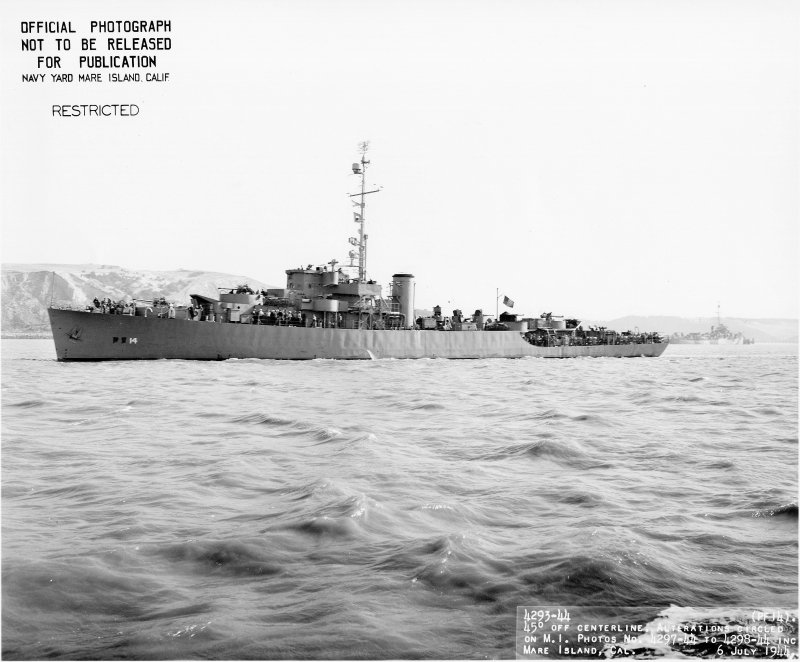
- USS Grand Island (PF-14)

History

United States
- Name: Grand Island
- Namesake: City of Grand Island, Nebraska
- Builder: Kaiser Cargo, Inc., Richmond, California
- Launched: 19 February 1944
- Commissioned: 27 May 1944
- Decommissioned: 21 May 1946
- Stricken: 1964
- Fate: Transferred to Cuba, 16 June 1947

History

Cuba
- Name: Maximo Gomez (F303)
- Namesake: Máximo Gómez
- Acquired: 16 June 1947
- Stricken: 1964
- Fate: Unknown

General characteristics
- Class & type: Tacoma-class frigate
- Displacement: 1,430 long tons (1,453 t) light; 2,415 long tons (2,454 t) full
- Length: 303 ft 11 in (92.63 m)
- Beam: 37 ft 11 in (11.56 m)
- Draft: 13 ft 8 in (4.17 m)
- Propulsion: 2 × 5,500 shp (4,101 kW) turbines; 3 boilers; 2 shafts
- Speed: 20 knots (37 km/h; 23 mph)
- Complement: 190
- Armament: 3 × 3"/50 dual purpose guns (3x1); 4 x 40 mm guns (2×2); 9 × 20 mm guns (9×1); 1 × Hedgehog anti-submarine mortar; 8 × Y-gun depth charge projectors; 2 × Depth charge tracks

USS Grand Island (PF-14), a Tacoma-class frigate, was the only ship of the United States Navy to be named for Grand Island, Nebraska. She was transferred to Cuba and renamed Máximo Gómez (F303).

== Construction ==
Grand Island, a patrol frigate, was originally classified as PG-122 and launched by the Kaiser Cargo, Inc., shipyard in Richmond, California, on 19 February 1944, as PF-14, sponsored by Mrs. William Shackleton; and commissioned on 27 May 1944.

== Service history ==
After completing her shakedown cruise off the coast of southern California, Grand Island reported for duty with the 12th Naval District on 12 September 1944. She subsequently performed weather station and plane guard duty out of San Francisco, California, and participated in several training exercises with patrol forces on the West Coast. She also was engaged from time to time in antisubmarine escort duty. Grand Island departed San Francisco on 26 March 1946, arrived at Charleston, South Carolina, on 13 April 1946 via the Panama Canal Zone, and was turned over to the 6th Naval District for disposal. She was decommissioned on 21 May 1946 and was stricken from the Navy Register on 19 June.

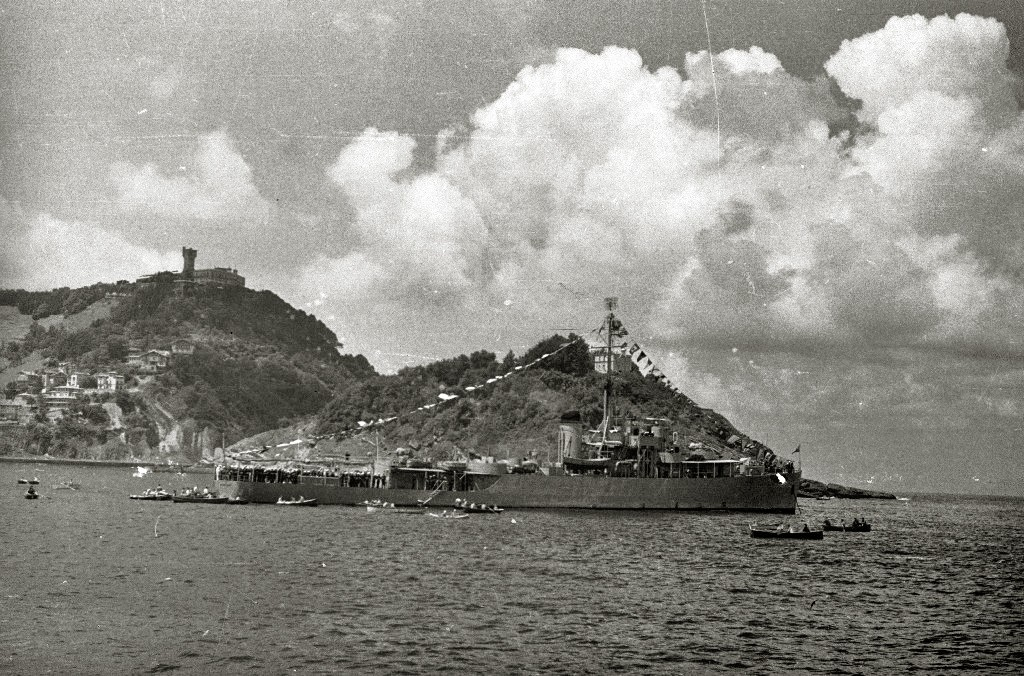
The Cuban Maximo Gomez visiting San Sebastián, Spain, in 1951

Declared not essential to the defense of the United States, the frigate was turned over to the State Department Foreign Liquidation Corporation and finally transferred to Cuba on 16 June 1947, where she served as Maximo Gomez.
