= HMS Seychelles =

Colony-class frigate

History

United States
- Name: USS Pearl
- Namesake: British name assigned in anticipation of ship's transfer to United Kingdom
- Reclassified: Patrol frigate, PF-88, 15 April 1943
- Builder: Walsh-Kaiser Company, Providence, Rhode Island
- Laid down: 28 September 1943 or 30 October 1943
- Renamed: Seychelles, 1943
- Namesake: Seychelles
- Launched: 30 October 1943 or 12 February 1944
- Commissioned: never
- Identification: PG-196
- Fate: Transferred to United Kingdom 12 February 1944 or 27 June 1944
- Acquired: Returned by United Kingdom June 1946
- Fate: Scrapped 1947

United Kingdom
- Name: HMS Seychelles
- Namesake: Seychelles
- Acquired: 12 February 1944 or 27 June 1944
- Commissioned: 12 February 1944 or 27 June 1944
- Identification: Pennant number: K592
- Fate: Returned to United States June 1946

General characteristics
- Class & type: Colony/Tacoma-class patrol frigate
- Displacement: 1,264 long tons (1,284 t)
- Length: 303 ft 11 in (92.63 m)
- Beam: 37 ft 6 in (11.43 m)
- Draft: 13 ft 8 in (4.17 m)
- Propulsion: 3 × boilers; 2 × turbines, 5,500 shp (4,100 kW) each; 2 shafts
- Speed: 20 knots (37 km/h; 23 mph)
- Complement: 190
- Armament: 3 × single 3 in (76 mm)/50 cal. AA guns; 2 × twin 40 mm guns; 9 × single 20 mm; 1 × Hedgehog anti-submarine mortar; 8 × Y-gun depth charge projectors; 2 × depth charge racks

HMS Seychelles (K592) was a Colony-class frigate of the United Kingdom that served during World War II. She originally was ordered by the United States Navy as the Tacoma-class patrol frigate USS Pearl (PF-88) and was transferred to the Royal Navy prior to completion.

== Construction and acquisition ==
The ship, originally designated a "patrol gunboat," PG-196, was ordered by the United States Maritime Commission under a United States Navy contract as USS Pearl. She was reclassified as a "patrol frigate," PF-88, on 15 April 1943 and laid down by the Walsh-Kaiser Company at Providence, Rhode Island, on, according to different sources, either 28 September 1943 or 30 October 1943 Intended for transfer to the United Kingdom, the ship was renamed Seychelles by the British prior to launching and was launched on either 30 October 1943 or 12 February 1944, according to different sources.

== Service history ==
Transferred to the United Kingdom under Lend-Lease on, according to different sources, either 12 February 1944 or 27 June 1944, the ship served in the Royal Navy as HMS Seychelles (K592) on patrol and escort duty.

== Disposal ==
The United Kingdom returned Seychelles to the U.S. Navy in June 1946. She was scrapped in 1947.
