= USS Charlotte (PF-60) =

Tacoma-class patrol frigate

History

United States
- Name: Charlotte
- Namesake: Charlotte, North Carolina; Charlotte, Michigan
- Builder: Globe Shipbuilding Company, Superior, Wisconsin
- Laid down: 5 August 1943
- Launched: 30 October 1943
- Commissioned: 9 October 1944
- Decommissioned: 16 April 1946
- Fate: Sold for scrapping, 13 May 1947

General characteristics
- Class & type: Tacoma-class frigate
- Displacement: 1,430 long tons (1,453 t) light; 2,415 long tons (2,454 t) full
- Length: 303 ft 11 in (92.63 m)
- Beam: 37 ft 6 in (11.43 m)
- Draft: 13 ft 8 in (4.17 m)
- Propulsion: 2 × 5,500 shp (4,101 kW) turbines; 3 boilers; 2 shafts
- Speed: 20 knots (37 km/h; 23 mph)
- Complement: 190
- Armament: 3 × 3"/50 dual purpose guns (3x1); 4 x 40 mm guns (2×2); 9 × 20 mm guns (9×1); 1 × Hedgehog anti-submarine mortar; 8 × Y-gun depth charge projectors; 2 × Depth charge tracks

USS Charlotte (PF-60), a Tacoma-class frigate, was the third ship of the United States Navy to be named Charlotte.

== Construction ==
The third Charlotte (PF-60) was launched on 30 October 1943, by Globe Shipbuilding Company, in Superior, Wisconsin, under a Maritime Commission contract, sponsored by Mrs. R. Billings; placed in service on 19 July 1944; commissioned on 9 October 1944 and reported to the U.S. Atlantic Fleet.

== Service history ==
Charlotte cleared Boston, Massachusetts, on 8 January 1945 to take up what was to be her primary mission through her naval service, sailing to NS Argentia, Newfoundland, where she took up weather station duty. Flashing news of weather conditions from her post at sea, she helped make it possible for specialists to prepare weather predictions. This information not only affected flight operations and ship movements in the western Atlantic where she patrolled, but since weather in general moves to the eastward, aided in predicting European conditions.

Between 21 and 26 March 1945, Charlotte aided Surprise (PG-63) and Tenacity (PG-71), rendezvousing at sea with the ice-damaged gunboats and towing them to Argentia. Later, she towed Tenacity to Boston, but by 5 April was back on her weather station. Similar duty in the North Atlantic, during which she kept alert for the possibility of rescuing downed aviators, continued until 17 January 1946, when she sailed from Boston for a weather station off Bermuda.

Charlotte arrived at Norfolk, Virginia, on 15 March 1946, and was decommissioned there on 16 April 1946. She was sold for scrapping on 13 May, but instead was converted to a coastal passenger ship for Brazil. The ship was scrapped in 1965.
