= USS Pueblo (PF-13) =

Tacoma-class patrol frigate

History

United States
- Name: Pueblo
- Namesake: City of Pueblo, Colorado
- Builder: Kaiser Cargo, Inc., Richmond, California
- Laid down: 14 November 1943
- Launched: 20 January 1944
- Commissioned: 27 May 1944
- Decommissioned: 6 April 1946
- Fate: Sold to the Dominican Republic, 1948

Dominican Republic
- Name: Presidente Troncoso (1948–1962); Gregorio Luperón (1962–1979)
- Namesake: Manuel Troncoso de la Concha; Gregorio Luperón
- Acquired: 1948
- Renamed: Gregorio Luperón, 1962
- Stricken: 1979
- Fate: Scrapped, 1982

General characteristics
- Class & type: Tacoma-class frigate
- Displacement: 1,430 long tons (1,453 t) light; 2,415 long tons (2,454 t) full
- Length: 303 ft 11 in (92.63 m)
- Beam: 37 ft 11 in (11.56 m)
- Draft: 13 ft 8 in (4.17 m)
- Propulsion: 2 × 5,500 shp (4,101 kW) turbines; 3 boilers; 2 shafts
- Speed: 20 knots (37 km/h; 23 mph)
- Complement: 190
- Armament: 3 × 3"/50 dual purpose guns (3x1); 4 x 40 mm guns (2×2); 9 × 20 mm guns (9×1); 1 × Hedgehog anti-submarine mortar; 8 × Y-gun depth charge projectors; 2 × Depth charge tracks

USS Pueblo (PF-13), a Tacoma-class frigate, was the second ship of the United States Navy to be named for Pueblo, Colorado.

== Construction ==
The second Pueblo (PF-13) was laid down under Maritime Commission contract (MC hull 1431) at the Kaiser Cargo, Inc., Yard #4, in Richmond, California, on 14 November 1943; launched on 20 January 1944, sponsored by Seaman Carol Barnhart, USN (W); and commissioned on 27 May 1944.

== Service history ==
Following shakedown off the southern California coast, Pueblo fitted out with highly sensitive meteorological instruments, reported for duty as a weather tracking ship with the Western Sea Frontier, on 26 October 1944. Assigned to the Northern California Sector, and based at San Francisco, she patrolled on ocean weather stations, reporting weather conditions and acting as lifeguard ship beneath the trans-pacific air routes, until March 1946. Then ordered to the east coast, she departed California on the 13th and headed for Charleston, South Carolina, and inactivation.

Decommissioned on 6 April 1946, she was sold to J. C. Berkwitz and Company, New York City, on 22 September 1947, and resold, a year later, to the government of the Dominican Republic. Originally renamed Presidente Troncoso (F103), the ship was again renamed Gregorio Luperón, before being scrapped in 1982.
