= HMS Perim =

Colony-class frigate

History

United States
- Name: USS Phillimore
- Namesake: British name assigned in anticipation of ship's transfer to United Kingdom
- Reclassified: Patrol frigate, PF-89, 15 April 1943
- Builder: Walsh-Kaiser Company, Providence, Rhode Island
- Laid down: 7 October 1943
- Renamed: Sierra Leone, 1943
- Namesake: Sierra Leone
- Renamed: Perim, 1943
- Namesake: Perim
- Launched: 5 November 1943
- Identification: PG-197
- Fate: Transferred to United Kingdom 16 March 1944

United Kingdom
- Name: HMS Perim
- Namesake: Perim
- Acquired: 16 March 1944
- Commissioned: 16 March 1944
- Decommissioned: 1945
- Identification: Pennant number: K593
- Fate: Returned to United States 22 May 1946, Scrapped 1947

General characteristics
- Class & type: Colony/Tacoma-class patrol frigate
- Displacement: 1,264 long tons (1,284 t)
- Length: 303 ft 11 in (92.63 m)
- Beam: 37 ft 6 in (11.43 m)
- Draft: 13 ft 8 in (4.17 m)
- Propulsion: 3 × boilers; 2 × turbines, 5,500 shp (4,100 kW) each; 2 shafts
- Speed: 20 knots (37 km/h; 23 mph)
- Complement: 190
- Armament: 3 × single 3 in (76 mm)/50 cal. AA guns; 2 × twin Bofors 40 mm guns; 9 × single Oerlikon 20 mm cannon; 1 × Hedgehog anti-submarine mortar; 8 × Y-gun depth charge projectors; 2 × depth charge racks

HMS Perim (K593), ex-Sierra Leone, was a Colony-class frigate of the United Kingdom that served during World War II. She originally was ordered by the United States Navy as the Tacoma-class patrol frigate USS Phillimore (PF-89) and was transferred to the Royal Navy prior to completion.

== Construction and acquisition ==
The ship, originally designated a "patrol gunboat," PG-197, was ordered by the United States Maritime Commission under a United States Navy contract as USS Phillimore. She was reclassified as a "patrol frigate," PF-89, on 15 April 1943 and laid down by the Walsh-Kaiser Company at Providence, Rhode Island, on 7 October 1943. Intended for transfer to the United Kingdom, the ship was first renamed Sierra Leone and then Perim by the British prior to launching and was launched on 5 November 1943.

== Service history ==
Transferred to the United Kingdom under Lend-Lease on 16 March 1944, the ship served in the Royal Navy as HMS Perim (K593). Her first commanding officer was Nicholas Monsarrat. Conducting work-ups off Bermuda, she damaged her main bearings during each of her first 13 sea trials before the problem was identified and corrected and she completed trials successfully on her fourteenth try. She then served on patrol and escort duty until decommissioned in 1945.

== Disposal ==
The United Kingdom returned Perim to the U.S. Navy on 22 May 1946. She was scrapped in 1947.
