= USS Casper =

Tacoma-class patrol frigate

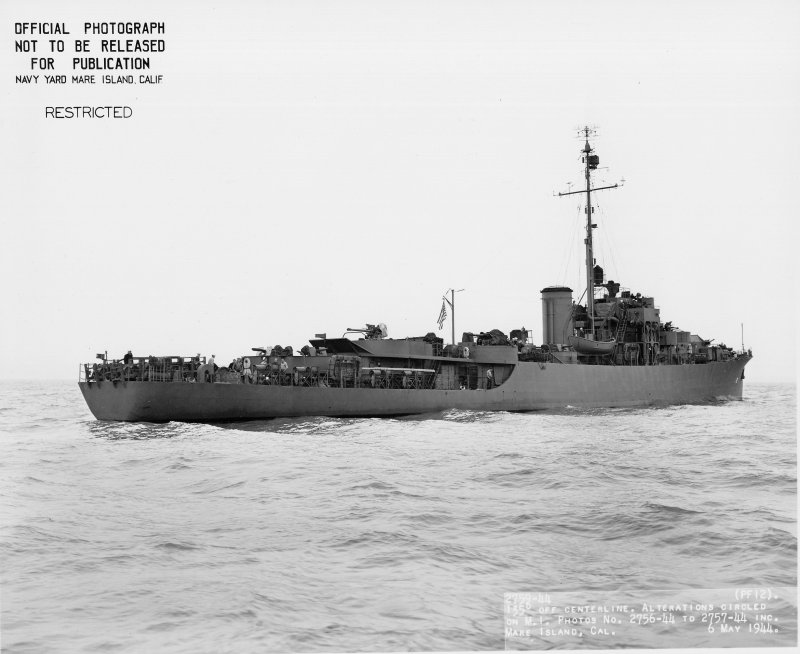
- USS Casper (PF-12)

History

United States
- Name: Casper
- Namesake: City of Casper, Wyoming
- Reclassified: Patrol Frigate (PF), 15 April 1943
- Ordered: as a Type S2-S2-AQ1 hull, MCE hull 1430
- Builder: Permanente Metals Richmond Shipyard #4, Richmond, California
- Yard number: 55
- Laid down: 17 October 1943
- Launched: 27 December 1943
- Commissioned: 31 March 1944
- Decommissioned: 16 May 1946
- Identification: Hull symbol: PG-120; Hull symbol: PF-12; Call sign: NYXV
- Fate: Sold for scrap, 20 May 1947

General characteristics
- Class & type: Tacoma-class frigate patrol frigate
- Displacement: 1,430 long tons (1,450 t) (light load); 2,415 long tons (2,454 t) (full load)
- Length: 303 ft 11 in (92.63 m)
- Beam: 37 ft 6 in (11.43 m)
- Draft: 13 ft 8 in (4.17 m)
- Installed power: 2 × 3-Drum express boilers , 240 psi (1,700 kPa); 5,500 ihp (4,100 kW)
- Propulsion: 2 × Vertical triple-expansion steam engine; 2 × shafts
- Speed: 20.3 kn (37.6 km/h; 23.4 mph)
- Complement: 190
- Armament: 3 × 3 in (76 mm)/50 caliber dual-purpose (DP) gun; 2 × twin 40 mm (1.57 in) Bofors anti-aircraft (AA) gun mounts; 9 × 20 mm (0.79 in) Oerlikon cannon AA gun mounts; 2 × Depth charge tracks; 8 × Depth charge projectors; 1 × Hedgehog

USS Casper (PG-120/PF-12), a Tacoma-class patrol frigate, was the only ship of the United States Navy to be named for Casper, Wyoming.

== Construction ==
Casper, originally classified as patrol gunboat, PG-120, was reclassified as a patrol frigate, PF-12, on 15 April 1943. She was laid down on 17 October 1943, under a Maritime Commission (MARCOM) contract, MC hull 1430, at the Permanente Metals Richmond Shipyard #4, Richmond, California. Casper (PF-12) was launched on 27 December 1943, sponsored by Mrs. E. J. Spaulding. She was commissioned on 31 March 1944.

== Service history ==
Casper sailed from San Francisco, California, on 30 September 1944, for a weather patrol out of Seattle, Washington, returning to San Francisco, 6 November. From this base, she operated as plane guard, and on weather patrol, performing these vital functions between the mainland and Pearl Harbor. During the organizing conference of the United Nations at San Francisco, which began 25 April 1945, Casper made two security patrols off the Farallon Islands.

Casper cleared San Francisco, on 4 April 1946, for Charleston, South Carolina, where she was decommissioned on 16 May 1946. The patrol frigate was sold 20 May 1947.

== Bibliography ==
- "Casper". Dictionary of American Naval Fighting Ships. Naval History and Heritage Command. This article incorporates text from this source, which is in the public domain.
- "Kaiser Permanente No. 4, Richmond CA". ShipbuildingHistory.com. 5 February 2014.
- "Casper (PF 12)". NavSource.
