= USS Key West (PF-17) =

Tacoma-class patrol frigate

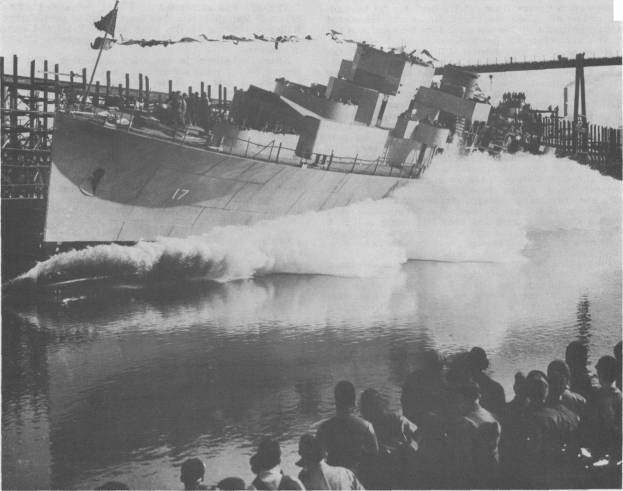
- USS Key West (PF-17) being launched sideways in 1943

History

United States
- Name: Key West
- Namesake: City of Key West, Florida
- Builder: American Ship Building Company, Lorain, Ohio
- Launched: 29 December 1943
- Commissioned: 7 November 1944
- Decommissioned: 14 June 1946
- Fate: Sold for scrapping, 18 April 1947

General characteristics
- Class & type: Tacoma-class frigate
- Displacement: 1,430 long tons (1,453 t) light; 2,415 long tons (2,454 t) full
- Length: 303 ft 11 in (92.63 m)
- Beam: 37 ft 11 in (11.56 m)
- Draft: 13 ft 8 in (4.17 m)
- Propulsion: 2 × 5,500 shp (4,101 kW) 3-stage reciprocating engines; 3 boilers; 2 shafts
- Speed: 20 knots (37 km/h; 23 mph)
- Complement: 190
- Armament: 3 × 3"/50 dual purpose guns (3x1); 4 x 40 mm guns (2×2); 9 × 20 mm guns (9×1); 1 × Hedgehog anti-submarine mortar; 8 × Y-gun depth charge projectors; 2 × Depth charge tracks

USS Key West (PG-125/PF-17), a Tacoma-class frigate, was the second ship of the United States Navy to be named for Key West, Florida.

== Construction ==
The second Key West, PF-17, originally classified PG-125, was launched on 29 December 1943 by the American Ship Building Company in Lorain, Ohio The ship was sponsored by Mrs. Vernon Lowe, sister of Lieutenant Harold Felton, the first resident of Key West reported missing in World War II. Key West was commissioned at Houston, Texas, on 7 November 1944.

== Service history ==
Key West stood out of Galveston Bay on 17 November 1944 for training exercises and escort duty out of Bermuda. The frigate operated there until sailing for Norfolk 22 December. Key West departed Hampton Roads on 18 January 1945, escorting a convoy to Oran, Algeria, and returned to Boston, Massachusetts, on 28 February.

During the next four months, she made two cruises out of Casco Bay, Maine. Upon her return to New York on 14 June, from her final cruise, Key West remained at Brooklyn until 5 July, when she sailed for Boston for conversion to a weather ship. Overall, Key West crossed the Atlantic approximately six times.

She departed Boston on 31 July, and after transiting the Panama Canal, arrived at Pearl Harbor on 23 August. Key West was then assigned to duty of weather station patrol in the vicinity of Guam, arriving there on 10 September. She operated out of Apra Harbor reporting meteorological data and stood by to aid ships in distress until 14 March 1946 when she arrived at San Francisco, California. Key West departed San Francisco on 9 April and served for three weeks on plane-guard station off the Northern California Coast. The weather ship arrived at Seattle, Washington, on 1 May, and was decommissioned at Bremerton, Washington, on 14 June 1946. She was sold on 18 April 1947 to Cascade Enterprises of Oakland, California, and scrapped.

USS Key West was originally fitted with an evaporator to provide steam for the reciprocating engine and fresh water for the crew. However, the evaporators for accompanying destroyer escorts provided insufficient fresh water. Thus, Key West was fitted with an additional evaporator. This, combined with fresh water rationing by the crew of Key West, allowed the destroyer escorts to be loaded with extra, sufficient fresh water daily.
