= USS Emporia =

Tacoma-class patrol frigate

History

United States
- Name: Emporia
- Namesake: City of Emporia, Kansas
- Reclassified: PF-28, 15 April 1943
- Builder: Walter Butler Shipbuilding Company, Superior, Wisconsin
- Launched: 30 August 1943
- Sponsored by: Mrs. George M. Barnaby
- Commissioned: 7 October 1944
- Decommissioned: 14 March 1946
- Fate: Sold to French Navy, 26 March 1947

France
- Name: Le Verrier
- Acquired: 26 March 1947
- Reclassified: F716, c. 1952
- Fate: Scrapped, 1958

General characteristics
- Class & type: Tacoma-class frigate
- Displacement: 1,430 long tons (1,453 t) light; 2,415 long tons (2,454 t) full
- Length: 303 ft 11 in (92.63 m)
- Beam: 37 ft 6 in (11.43 m)
- Draft: 13 ft 8 in (4.17 m)
- Propulsion: 2 × 5,500 shp (4,101 kW) turbines; 3 boilers; 2 shafts
- Speed: 20 knots (37 km/h; 23 mph)
- Complement: 190
- Armament: 3 × 3"/50 dual purpose guns (3x1); 4 x 40 mm guns (2×2); 9 × 20 mm guns (9×1); 1 × Hedgehog anti-submarine mortar; 8 × Y-gun depth charge projectors; 2 × Depth charge tracks

USS Emporia (PF-28), a Tacoma-class frigate, was the only ship of the United States Navy to be named for the city of Emporia, Kansas.

== Construction ==
Emporia (PF-28) was launched on 30 August 1943, at the Walter Butler Shipbuilding Company in Superior, Wisconsin, sponsored by Mrs. George M. Barnaby; placed in service between 12 and 22 June 1944, for passage to Houston, Texas; and commissioned on 7 October 1944.

== Service history ==
Emporia arrived at NS Argentia, Newfoundland, on 3 December 1944, to begin the vitally important duty of relaying weather reports from stations at sea between Newfoundland and Bermuda. Operating primarily in northern latitudes, she accumulated data essential to planning the movement of ships and aircraft throughout the Atlantic. After the close of the war, she continued this duty to aid the movement of troops home from Europe.

On 22 August 1946, Emporia arrived at New Orleans, Louisiana, where on 14 March 1946 she was decommissioned, and immediately recommissioned as a ship of the United States Coast Guard. She was again decommissioned on 28 August 1946, and sold to France on 26 March 1947 for continued weather patrol service. Renamed Le Verrier, she was scrapped in 1958.

== See also ==
- List of Escorteurs of the French Navy
