= HMS Cayman =

Frigate of the Royal Navy

History

United States
- Name: USS Harland (PG-186)
- Namesake: British name assigned in anticipation of ship's transfer to United Kingdom
- Reclassified: Patrol frigate, PF-78, 15 April 1943
- Builder: Walsh-Kaiser Company, Providence, Rhode Island
- Laid down: 15 July 1943
- Renamed: Cayman, 1943
- Namesake: The Cayman Islands
- Launched: 6 September 1943
- Commissioned: never
- Fate: Transferred to United Kingdom, 20 January 1944
- Acquired: Returned by United Kingdom 23 April 1946
- Fate: Sold for scrapping 1 July 1947

United Kingdom
- Name: HMS Cayman (K506)
- Namesake: The Cayman Islands
- Acquired: 20 January 1944
- Commissioned: 20 January 1944
- Fate: Returned to United States 23 April 1946

General characteristics
- Class & type: Colony/Tacoma-class frigate
- Displacement: 1,264 long tons (1,284 t)
- Length: 303 ft 11 in (92.63 m)
- Beam: 37 ft 6 in (11.43 m)
- Draft: 13 ft 8 in (4.17 m)
- Propulsion: 3 × boilers; 2 × turbines, 5,500 shp (4,100 kW) each; 2 shafts
- Speed: 20 knots (37 km/h; 23 mph)
- Complement: 190
- Armament: 3 × single 3 inch/50 AA guns; 2 × twin 40 mm guns; 9 × single 20 mm; 1 × Hedgehog anti-submarine mortar; 8 × Y gun depth charge projectors; 2 × depth charge racks

HMS Cayman (K506) was a Colony-class frigate of the United Kingdom that served during World War II. She originally was ordered by the United States Navy as the Tacoma-class patrol frigate USS Harland (PF-78) and was transferred to the Royal Navy prior to completion.

== Construction and acquisition ==
The ship, originally designated a "patrol gunboat," PG-186, was ordered by the United States Maritime Commission under a United States Navy contract as USS Harland. She was reclassified as a "patrol frigate," PF-78, on 15 April 1943 and laid down by the Walsh-Kaiser Company at Providence, Rhode Island, on 15 July 1943. Intended for transfer to the United Kingdom, the ship was renamed Cayman by the British prior to launching and was launched on 6 September 1943.

== Service history ==
Transferred to the United Kingdom under Lend-Lease on 20 January 1944, the ship served in the Royal Navy as HMS Cayman (K506) on patrol and escort duty.

== Disposal ==
The United Kingdom returned Cayman to the U.S. Navy on 23 April 1946. She was sold to the United Dock Corporation of New York, New York, on 1 July 1947 for scrapping.

== Bibliography ==
- Photo gallery of HMS Cayman at NavSource Naval History
