= USS Brunswick (PF-68) =

Tacoma-class patrol frigate

History

United States
- Name: Brunswick
- Namesake: City of Brunswick, Georgia
- Builder: Leathem D. Smith Shipbuilding Company, Sturgeon Bay, Wisconsin, and Todd Galveston Drydocks, Inc., Galveston, Texas
- Laid down: 16 July 1943
- Launched: 6 November 1943
- Sponsored by: Mrs. K. G. Berrie
- Commissioned: 20 May 1944 (reduced)
- Decommissioned: 27 May 1944
- Recommissioned: 3 October 1944
- Decommissioned: 3 May 1946
- Reclassified: From patrol gunboat, PG-176, to patrol frigate, PF-68, 15 April 1943
- Stricken: 19 June 1946
- Fate: Sold for scrapping 9 April 1947

General characteristics
- Class & type: Tacoma-class frigate
- Displacement: 1,264 long tons (1,284 t)
- Length: 303 ft 11 in (92.63 m)
- Beam: 37 ft 11 in (11.56 m)
- Draft: 13 ft 8 in (4.17 m)
- Propulsion: 2 × 5,500 shp (4,101 kW) turbines; 3 boilers; 2 shafts
- Speed: 20 knots (37 km/h; 23 mph)
- Complement: 190
- Armament: 3 × 3"/50 dual purpose guns (3x1); 4 x 40 mm guns (2×2); 9 × 20 mm guns (9×1); 1 × Hedgehog anti-submarine mortar; 8 × Y-gun depth charge projectors; 2 × Depth charge tracks

The second USS Brunswick (PF-68) was a United States Navy Tacoma-class frigate in commission from 1944 to 1946.

== Construction and commissioning ==
Brunswick originally was authorized as a patrol gunboat with the hull number PG-176, but she was redesignated as a patrol frigate with the hull number PF-68 on 15 April 1943. She was laid down under a Maritime Commission contract as Maritime Commission Hull 1492 on 16 July 1943 by the Leathem D. Smith Shipbuilding Company at Sturgeon Bay, Wisconsin. She was launched on 6 November 1943, sponsored by Mrs. K. G. Berrie, and placed in reduced commission on 20 May 1944 for a trip to Galveston, Texas. After arriving at Galveston, Brunswick was decommissioned there on 27 May 1944. She then was fitted out at the Todd Galveston Drydocks, Inc. and was placed in full commission on 3 October 1944, with a United States Coast Guard crew.

== Service history ==
=== World War II, 1944–1945 ===
Brunswick departed Galveston on 15 October 1944 on her way to shakedown training in the West Indies. She arrived in the vicinity of Bermuda and underwent her shakedown evolutions between 24 October 1944 and 22 November 1944.

Brunswick embarked upon the first of her three round-trip convoy escort missions to North Africa on 11 December 1944. Steaming from Hampton Roads, Virginia, she arrived in Oran, Algeria, with Convoy UGS-63 on 28 December 1944. On 2 January 1945, she stood out of Oran in the screen of Convoy GUS-63. Soon after the convoy passed through the Strait of Gibraltar, one of its ships, the merchant ship SS Henry Miller, suffered a torpedo hit from the German submarine U-870. Brunswick conducted a depth-charge attack, but U-870 escaped. Brunswick escorted the damaged Henry Miller into Gibraltar and then rejoined the convoy screen. She and the rest of the convoy arrived safely in Hampton Roads on 20 January 1945.

Between early February and early June 1945, Brunswick escorted merchant ships on two more round-trip voyages from Hampton Roads to Oran and back. She returned to the Norfolk, Virginia, area from the last of those voyages on 6 June 1945.

=== Postwar ===
From Norfolk, Brunswick moved north to Philadelphia, Pennsylvania, where the Philadelphia Navy Yard converted her for duty as a weather ship. She embarked upon her first weather patrol early in July 1945 and concluded her final one on 12 November 1945. Thereafter, Brunswick served in the U.S. Coast Guard temporarily.

Returned to the Navy at Norfolk early in April 1946, Brunswick was decommissioned there on 3 May 1946. Her name was struck from the Navy List on 19 June 1946, and she was sold on 9 April 1947 to the Sun Shipbuilding and Drydock Company of Chester, Pennsylvania, for scrapping.
