= USS Woonsocket =

Tacoma-class patrol frigate

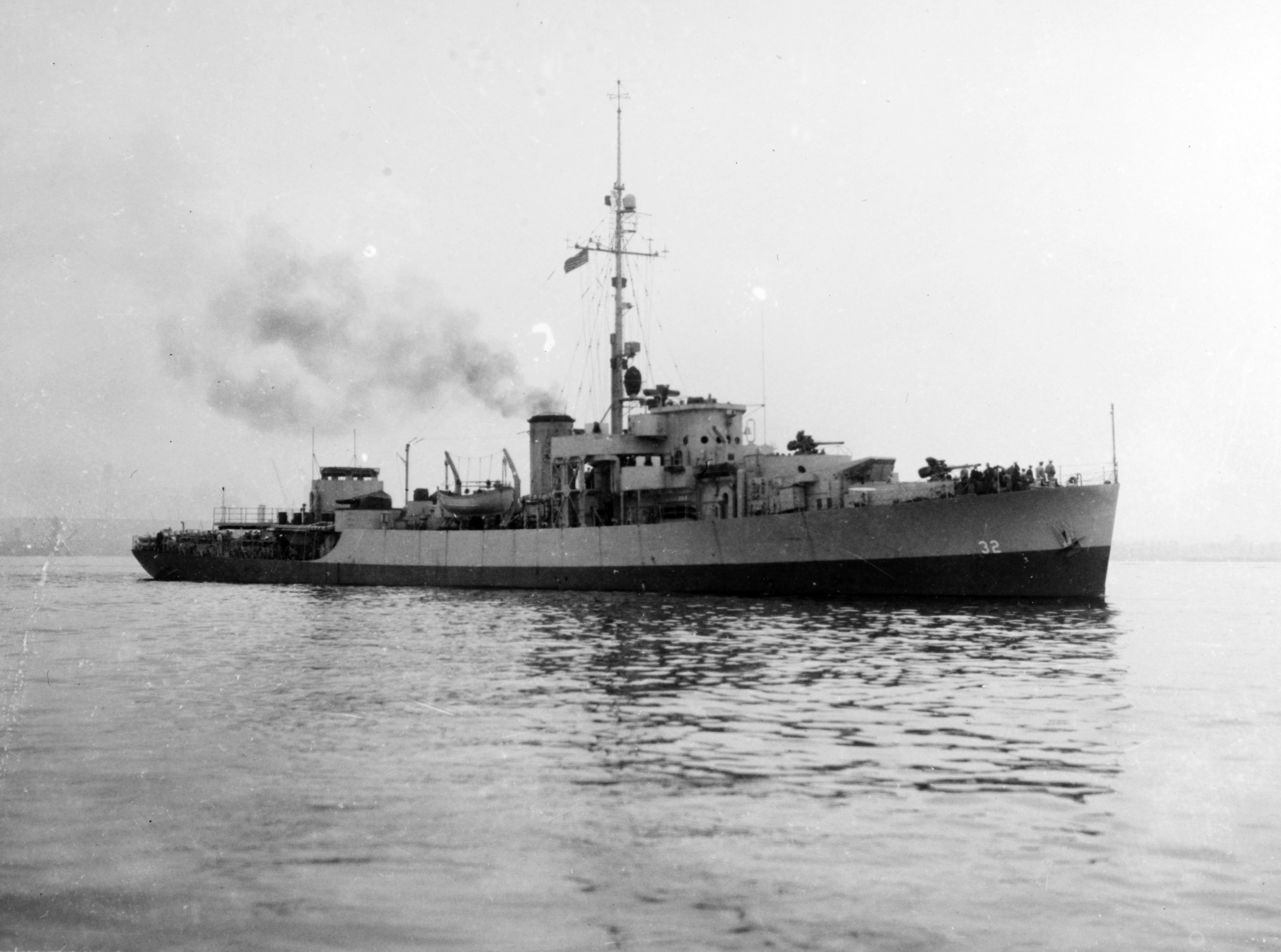
- USS Woonsocket (PF-32) in 1944

History

United States
- Name: Woonsocket
- Namesake: City of Woonsocket, Rhode Island
- Builder: Walter Butler Shipbuilding Company, Superior, Wisconsin
- Laid down: 12 August 1943
- Launched: 27 September 1943
- Commissioned: 1 September 1944
- Decommissioned: 16 March 1946
- Stricken: 14 May 1947
- Fate: Transferred to the US Coast Guard, 16 March 1946

United States
- Name: Woonsocket
- Commissioned: 16 March 1944
- Decommissioned: 18 September 1946
- Fate: Sold to Peru, 1947

Peru
- Name: Teniente Gálvez
- Acquired: 1948
- Decommissioned: 1961
- Renamed: Gálvez
- Reclassified: FE-1
- Fate: Broken up

General characteristics
- Class & type: Tacoma-class frigate
- Displacement: 1,264 long tons (1,284 t)
- Length: 303 ft 11 in (92.63 m)
- Beam: 37 ft 6 in (11.43 m)
- Draft: 13 ft 8 in (4.17 m)
- Propulsion: 2 × 5,500 shp (4,101 kW) turbines; 3 boilers; 2 shafts
- Speed: 20 knots (37 km/h; 23 mph)
- Complement: 190
- Armament: 3 × 3"/50 dual purpose guns (3x1); 4 x 40 mm guns (2×2); 9 × 20 mm guns (9×1); 1 × Hedgehog anti-submarine mortar; 8 × Y-gun depth charge projectors; 2 × Depth charge tracks

USS Woonsocket (PF-32) was a Tacoma-class frigate in service with the United States Navy from 1944 to 1946. She was sold to Peru in 1947, where she served as BAP Gálvez (F-1/FE-1) until 1961.

== Construction ==
USS Woonsocket (PF-32) was named for Woonsocket, Rhode Island. She was originally classified as PG-140 and re-designated PF-32 on 25 June 1943, was laid down under a Maritime Commission contract (MC hull 1443) on 12 August 1943 at the Walter Butler Shipbuilding Company in Superior, Wisconsin; launched on 27 September 1943, sponsored by Mrs. Ernest E. Dupre, wife of the mayor of Woonsocket; ferried to the Boston Navy Yard for completion; accepted by the Navy on 27 July 1944; and commissioned with a Coast Guard crew on 1 September 1944.

== Service history ==
Following shakedown off Bermuda, Woonsocket returned to Boston for conversion to a weather ship before proceeding to Newfoundland, arriving at NS Argentia on 30 October. She performed meteorological charting duties off Newfoundland through the end of World War II and into the early months of 1946. She was decommissioned by the Navy on 16 March 1946 and recommissioned simultaneously by the Coast Guard on a loan basis. Woonsocket served with the Coast Guard until her final decommissioning on 18 September 1946 at New Orleans, Louisiana

== Peruvian service ==
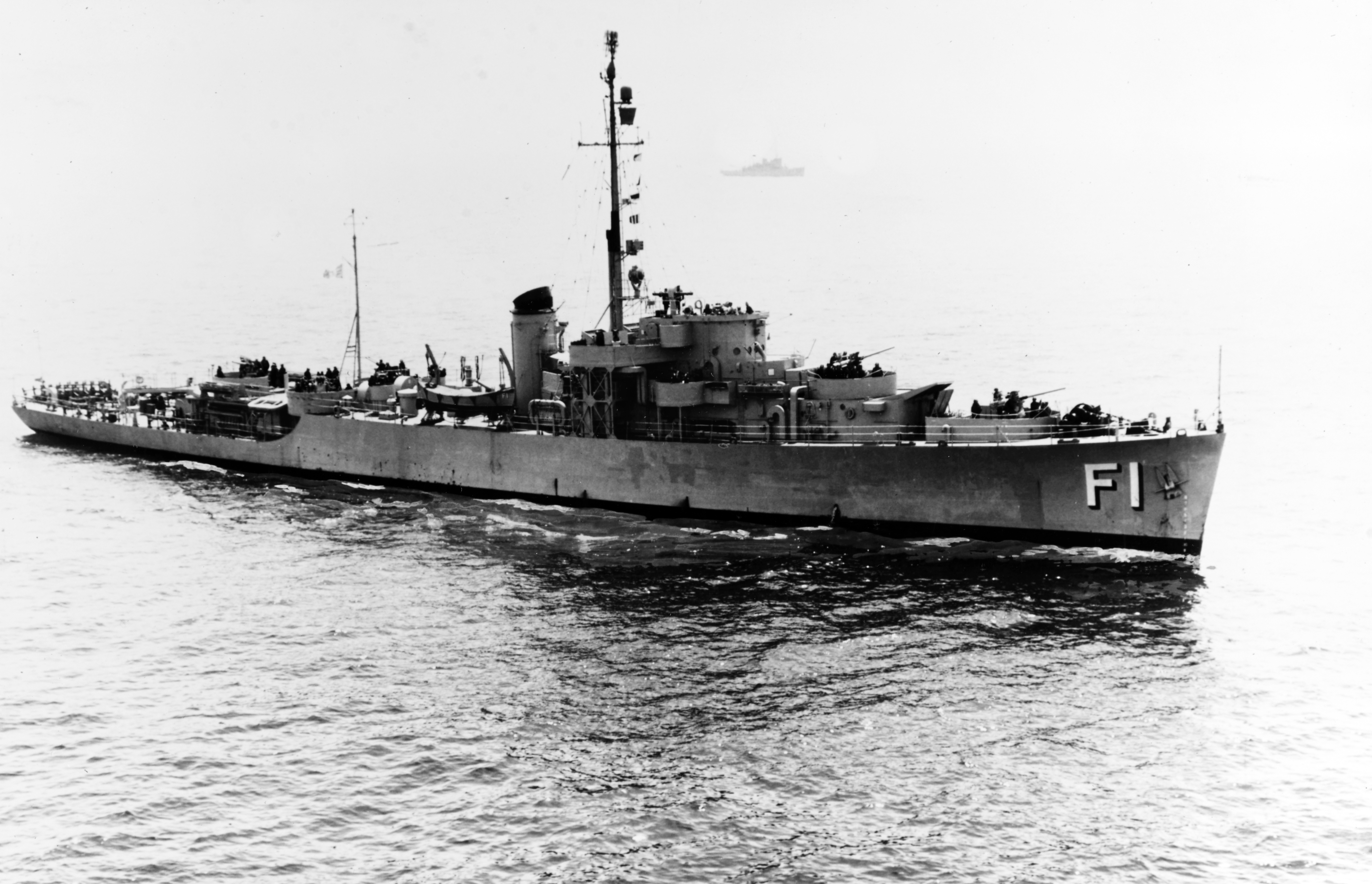
BAP Gálvez (F-1) off Norfolk, Virginia on 18 April 1952

Struck from the Navy list on 14 May 1947, the frigate was subsequently transferred to the Government of Peru. She served the Peruvian Navy first as Teniente Gálvez (F 1) and later simply as Gálvez. Reclassified FE-1, she was decommissioned in 1961, and later broken up.
