= USS Grand Forks =

Tacoma-class patrol frigate

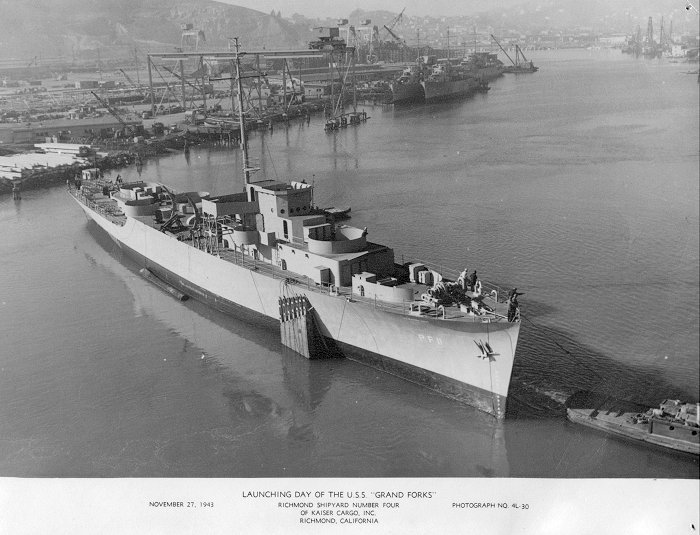
- USS Grand Forks (PF-11) just after launch

History

United States
- Name: Grand Forks
- Namesake: City of Grand Forks, North Dakota
- Reclassified: Patrol Frigate (PF), 15 April 1943
- Ordered: as a Type S2-S2-AQ1 hull, MCE hull 1429
- Builder: Permanente Metals Richmond Shipyard #4, Richmond, California
- Yard number: 54
- Laid down: 29 September 1943
- Launched: 27 November 1943
- Commissioned: 18 March 1944
- Decommissioned: 16 May 1946
- Stricken: 19 June 1946
- Identification: Hull symbol: PG-119; Hull symbol: PF-11; Call sign: NQEC
- Fate: Scrapped, 1 November 1947

General characteristics
- Class & type: Tacoma-class patrol frigate
- Displacement: 1,430 long tons (1,450 t) (light load); 2,415 long tons (2,454 t) (full load)
- Length: 303 ft 11 in (92.63 m)
- Beam: 37 ft 6 in (11.43 m)
- Draft: 13 ft 8 in (4.17 m)
- Installed power: 2 × 3-Drum express boilers , 240 psi (1,700 kPa); 5,500 ihp (4,100 kW)
- Propulsion: 2 × Vertical triple-expansion steam engine; 2 × shafts
- Speed: 20.3 kn (37.6 km/h; 23.4 mph)
- Complement: 190
- Armament: 3 × 3 in (76 mm)/50 caliber dual-purpose (DP) gun; 2 × twin 40 mm (1.57 in) Bofors anti-aircraft (AA) gun mounts; 9 × 20 mm (0.79 in) Oerlikon cannon AA gun mounts; 2 × Depth charge tracks; 8 × Depth charge projectors; 1 × Hedgehog

USS Grand Forks (PG-119/PF-11), a Tacoma-class patrol frigate, was the only ship of the United States Navy to be named for Grand Forks, North Dakota.

== Construction ==
Grand Forks, originally classified as patrol gunboat, PG-119, was reclassified as a patrol frigate, PF-11, on 15 April 1943. She was laid down on 29 September 1943, under a Maritime Commission (MARCOM) contract, MC hull 1429, at the Permanente Metals Richmond Shipyard #4, Richmond, California. Grand Forks was launched on 27 November 1943, sponsored by Mrs. T. H. Thoreson; and commissioned on 18 March 1944.

== Service history ==
After shakedown, on 7 August 1944, Grand Forks sailed from San Francisco, California, to take station in the Northern Pacific off the California coast as a plane guard ship, returning to San Francisco, on 3 September. She continued on this duty until decommissioning, spending an average of 3 weeks at sea and 2 in port.

Late in the night 11 October 1944, Grand Forks picked up a distress call from a Consolidated PB2Y Coronado about to make an emergency landing. Sending up flares and star shells to guide the plane through the dark, Grand Forks rescued 15 crewmen and passengers from the sea, as well as 114 sacks of mail.

While in port from guard duty on 31 May 1945, Grand Forks was toured by several members of the American delegation to the San Francisco Peace Conference, including Secretary of State and Mrs. Edward Stettinius, Nelson Rockefeller, and Alger Hiss.

She continued on plane guard duty until 19 March 1946, and then sailed from San Francisco to Charleston, South Carolina, where she decommissioned on 16 May 1946. Grand Forks was stricken from the Navy Register on 19 June 1946; sold to J. C. Berkwit & Company of New York on 19 May 1947, and scrapped starting on 1 November 1947.

== Bibliography ==
- "Grand Forks (PF-11)". Dictionary of American Naval Fighting Ships. Naval History and Heritage Command. 20 August 2016. This article incorporates text from this source, which is in the public domain.
- "Kaiser Permanente No. 4, Richmond CA". ShipbuildingHistory.com. 5 February 2014.
- "Grand Forks (PF 11)". NavSource.
