= USS Milledgeville (PF-98) =

Cancelled Tacoma-class frigate

History

United States
- Name: Milledgeville
- Namesake: City of Milledgeville, Georgia
- Builder: American Shipbuilding Company, Lorain, Ohio
- Laid down: Canceled
- Reclassified: From patrol gunboat, PG-206, to patrol frigate, PF-98, 15 April 1943
- Fate: Construction contract cancelled, 31 December 1943

General characteristics
- Class & type: Tacoma-class frigate
- Displacement: 1,264 long tons (1,284 t)
- Length: 303 ft 11 in (92.63 m)
- Beam: 37 ft 11 in (11.56 m)
- Draft: 13 ft 8 in (4.17 m)
- Propulsion: 2 × 5,500 shp (4,101 kW) turbines; 3 boilers; 2 shafts
- Speed: 20 knots (37 km/h; 23 mph)
- Complement: 190
- Armament: 3 × 3"/50 dual purpose guns (3x1); 4 x 40 mm guns (2×2); 9 × 20 mm guns (9×1); 1 × Hedgehog anti-submarine mortar; 8 × Y-gun depth charge projectors; 2 × Depth charge tracks

USS Milledgeville (PF-98) was a United States Navy Tacoma-class frigate authorized for construction during World War II but cancelled before construction could begin.

Milledgeville originally was authorized as a patrol gunboat with the hull number PG-206, but she was redesignated as a patrol frigate with the hull number PF-98 on 15 April 1943.

Plans called for Milledgeville to be built under a Maritime Commission contract by the American Shipbuilding Company at Lorain, Ohio, as a Maritime Commission Type T. S2-S2-AQ1 hull. However, the contract for her construction for the U.S. Navy was cancelled on 31 December 1943 prior to the laying of her keel.

On 7 February 1944, the cancelled Milledgeville's incomplete sister ship, the Tacoma-class patrol frigate USS Sitka (PF-94) was renamed USS Milledgeville (PF-94).
