= USS Eugene (PF-40) =

Tacoma-class patrol frigate

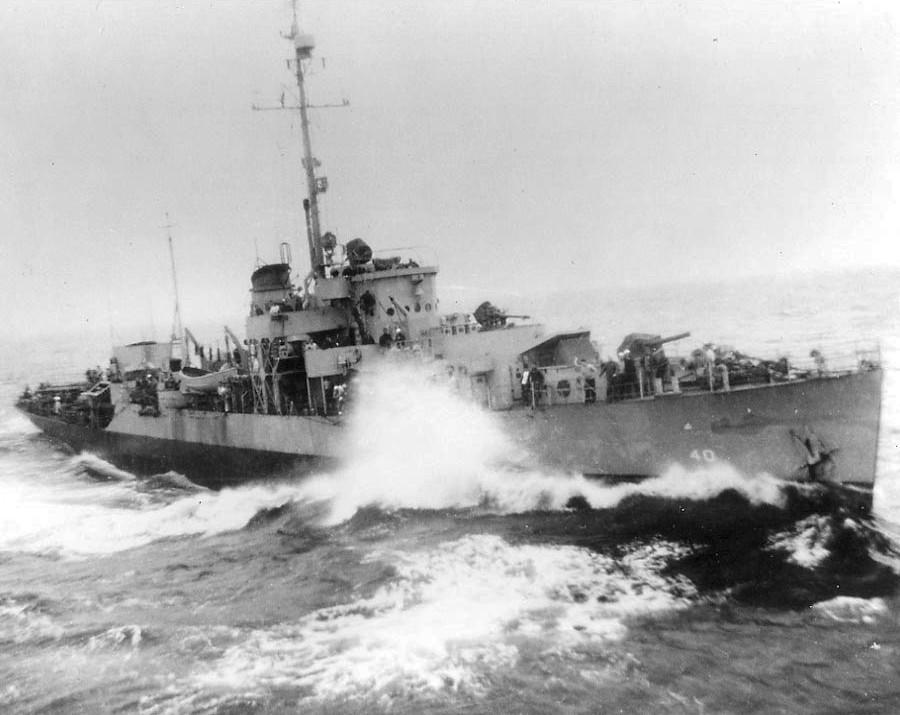

History

United States
- Name: Eugene
- Namesake: City of Eugene, Oregon
- Builder: Consolidated Steel Corporation, Wilmington, Los Angeles
- Launched: 6 July 1943
- Commissioned: 15 January 1944
- Decommissioned: 12 June 1946
- Stricken: 19 July 1946
- Honors and awards: 2 × battle stars (World War II)
- Fate: Transferred to Cuba, 1947

History

Cuba
- Name: José Martí (F301)
- Namesake: José Martí
- Fate: Scrapped, 1976

General characteristics
- Class & type: Tacoma-class frigate
- Displacement: 1,264 long tons (1,284 t)
- Length: 303 ft 11 in (92.63 m)
- Beam: 37 ft 11 in (11.56 m)
- Draft: 13 ft 8 in (4.17 m)
- Propulsion: 2 × 5,500 shp (4,101 kW) turbines; 3 boilers; 2 shafts
- Speed: 20 knots (37 km/h; 23 mph)
- Complement: 190
- Armament: 3 × 3"/50 dual purpose guns (3x1); 4 x 40 mm guns (2×2); 9 × 20 mm guns (9×1); 1 × Hedgehog anti-submarine mortar; 8 × Y-gun depth charge projectors; 2 × Depth charge tracks

USS Eugene (PF-40), a Tacoma-class frigate, originally classified as PG-148, is the only ship of the United States Navy to be named for Eugene, Oregon.

== Service history ==
Eugene (PF-40) was launched at the Consolidated Steel Corporation shipyard in Wilmington, Los Angeles, on 6 July 1943, sponsored by Mrs. Frank D. Cross; and commissioned on 15 January 1944.

Following her shakedown cruise, Eugene, who was manned by a Coast Guard crew, stood out of San Francisco, California, en route to the southwestern Pacific.

Arriving off the coast of Australia in late June 1944, she engaged in anti-submarine patrol off New Guinea and the Philippines, transported personnel, bombarded the shore at Soepiori Island, but principally escorted convoys among the islands of the area.

In December 1944, she returned to the United States for overhaul. She returned briefly to convoy duty until 25 May 1945, when she was converted to a weather ship, and performed this duty until arriving at Charleston, South Carolina, for decommissioning on 12 June 1946. Eugene was stricken from the Navy List on 19 July 1946.

Eugene was transferred to Cuba in 1947 and renamed José Martí (F 301). She was scrapped in 1976.

== Awards ==
Eugene received two battle stars for World War II service.
