= HMS Dominica (K507) =

Colony-class frigate

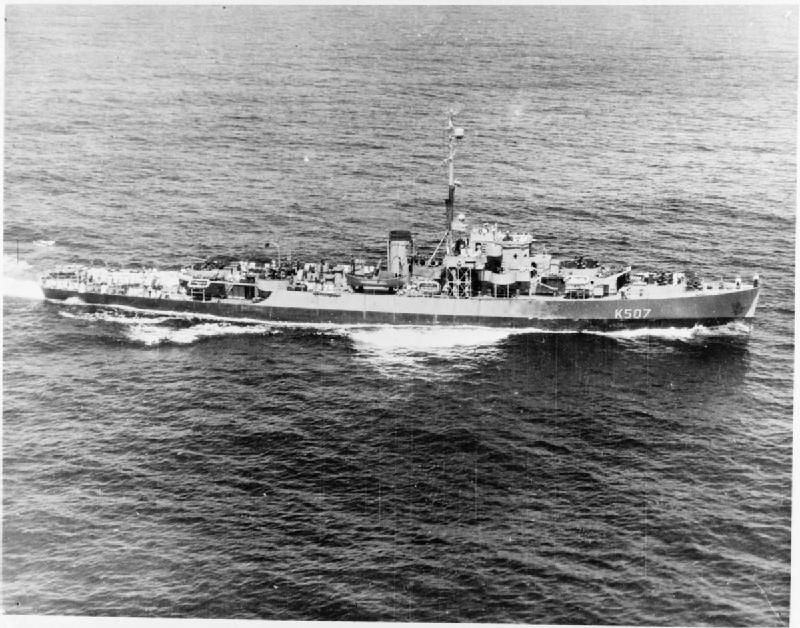
- HMS Dominica in February 1944

History

United States
- Name: Harman (PG-187)
- Namesake: British name assigned in anticipation of ship's transfer to United Kingdom
- Builder: Walsh-Kaiser Company, Providence, Rhode Island
- Laid down: 27 July 1943
- Renamed: Dominica, 1943
- Reclassified: Patrol frigate, PF-79, 15 April 1943
- Namesake: Dominica
- Launched: 14 September 1943
- Fate: Transferred to United Kingdom 25 January 1944
- Acquired: Returned by United Kingdom 23 April 1946
- Fate: Sold 27 March 1947 for scrapping

United Kingdom
- Name: HMS Dominica
- Namesake: Dominica
- Acquired: 25 January 1944
- Commissioned: 25 January 1944
- Decommissioned: 1945
- Identification: Pennant number: K507
- Fate: Returned to United States, 23 April 1946

General characteristics
- Class & type: Colony-class 5/Tacoma-class frigate
- Displacement: 1,264 long tons (1,284 t)
- Length: 303 ft 11 in (92.63 m)
- Beam: 37 ft 6 in (11.43 m)
- Draft: 13 ft 8 in (4.17 m)
- Propulsion: 3 × boilers; 2 × turbines, 5,500 shp (4,100 kW) each; 2 shafts
- Speed: 20 knots (37 km/h; 23 mph)
- Complement: 190
- Armament: 3 × single 3-inch/50 cal. AA guns; 2 × twin 40 mm guns; 9 × single 20 mm; 1 × Hedgehog anti-submarine mortar; 8 × Y-gun depth charge projectors; 2 × depth charge racks

The fourth HMS Dominica (K507) was a Colony-class frigate of the United Kingdom which served in the Royal Navy during World War II. She originally was ordered by the United States Navy as the Tacoma-class patrol frigate USS Harman (PF-79) and was transferred to the Royal Navy prior to completion.

== Construction and acquisition ==
The ship, originally designated a "patrol gunboat," PG-187, was ordered by the United States Maritime Commission under a United States Navy contract as USS Harman. She was reclassified as a "patrol frigate," PF-79, on 15 April 1943 and laid down by the Walsh-Kaiser Company at Providence, Rhode Island, on 27 July 1943. Intended for transfer to the United Kingdom, the ship was renamed Dominica by the British prior to launching and was launched on 14 September 1943, sponsored by Mrs. Andrew D. Manchester.

== Service history ==
Transferred to the United Kingdom under Lend-Lease on 25 January 1944, the ship served in the Royal Navy as HMS Dominica (K507) on patrol and escort duty until 1945.

== Disposal ==
The United Kingdom returned Dominica to the U.S. Navy on 23 April 1946. She was sold to the Sun Shipbuilding and Drydock Company of Chester, Pennsylvania, on 27 March 1947 for scrapping.
