= HMS Montserrat =

Colony-class frigate

History

United States
- Name: USS Hornby
- Namesake: British name assigned in anticipation of ship's transfer to United Kingdom
- Reclassified: Patrol frigate, PF-82, 15 April 1943
- Builder: Walsh-Kaiser Company, Providence, Rhode Island
- Laid down: 28 August 1943
- Renamed: Monsterrat, 1943
- Namesake: Montserrat
- Launched: 27 September 1943
- Sponsored by: Mrs. Harry Gray
- Commissioned: never
- Identification: PG-190
- Fate: Transferred to United Kingdom, 31 August 1944
- Acquired: Returned by United Kingdom 11 June 1946
- Fate: Sold for scrapping 30 November 1947

United Kingdom
- Name: HMS Montserrat
- Namesake: Montserrat
- Acquired: 31 August 1944
- Commissioned: 31 August 1944
- Identification: K586
- Fate: Returned to United States 11 June 1946

General characteristics
- Class & type: Colony/Tacoma-class patrol frigate
- Displacement: 1,264 long tons (1,284 t)
- Length: 303 ft 11 in (92.63 m)
- Beam: 37 ft 6 in (11.43 m)
- Draft: 13 ft 8 in (4.17 m)
- Propulsion: 3 × boilers; 2 × turbines, 5,500 shp (4,100 kW) each; 2 shafts
- Speed: 20 knots (37 km/h; 23 mph)
- Complement: 190
- Armament: 3 × single 3 in (76 mm)/50 cal. AA guns; 2 × twin 40 mm guns; 9 × single 20 mm; 1 × Hedgehog anti-submarine mortar; 8 × Y-gun depth charge projectors; 2 × depth charge racks

HMS Montserrat (K586) was a Colony-class frigate of the United Kingdom that served during World War II. She originally was ordered by the United States Navy as the Tacoma-class patrol frigate USS Hornby (PF-82) and was transferred to the Royal Navy prior to completion.

== Construction and acquisition ==
The ship, originally designated a "patrol gunboat," PG-190, was ordered by the United States Maritime Commission under a United States Navy contract as USS Hornby. She was reclassified as a "patrol frigate," PF-82, on 15 April 1943 and laid down by the Walsh-Kaiser Company at Providence, Rhode Island, on 28 August 1943. Intended for transfer to the United Kingdom, the ship was renamed Montserrat by the British prior to launching and was launched on 27 September 1943.

== Service history ==
Transferred to the United Kingdom under Lend-Lease on 31 August 1944, the ship served in the Royal Navy as HMS Montserrat (K586) on patrol and escort duty.

== Disposal ==
The United Kingdom returned Montserrat to the U.S. Navy on 11 June 1946. She was sold to the John J. Duane Company of Quincy, Massachusetts, on 30 November 1947 for scrapping.

== Notes ==
=== Bibliography ===
- Photo gallery of HMS Montserrat at NavSource Naval History
