= USS Brownsville =

Tacoma-class patrol frigate

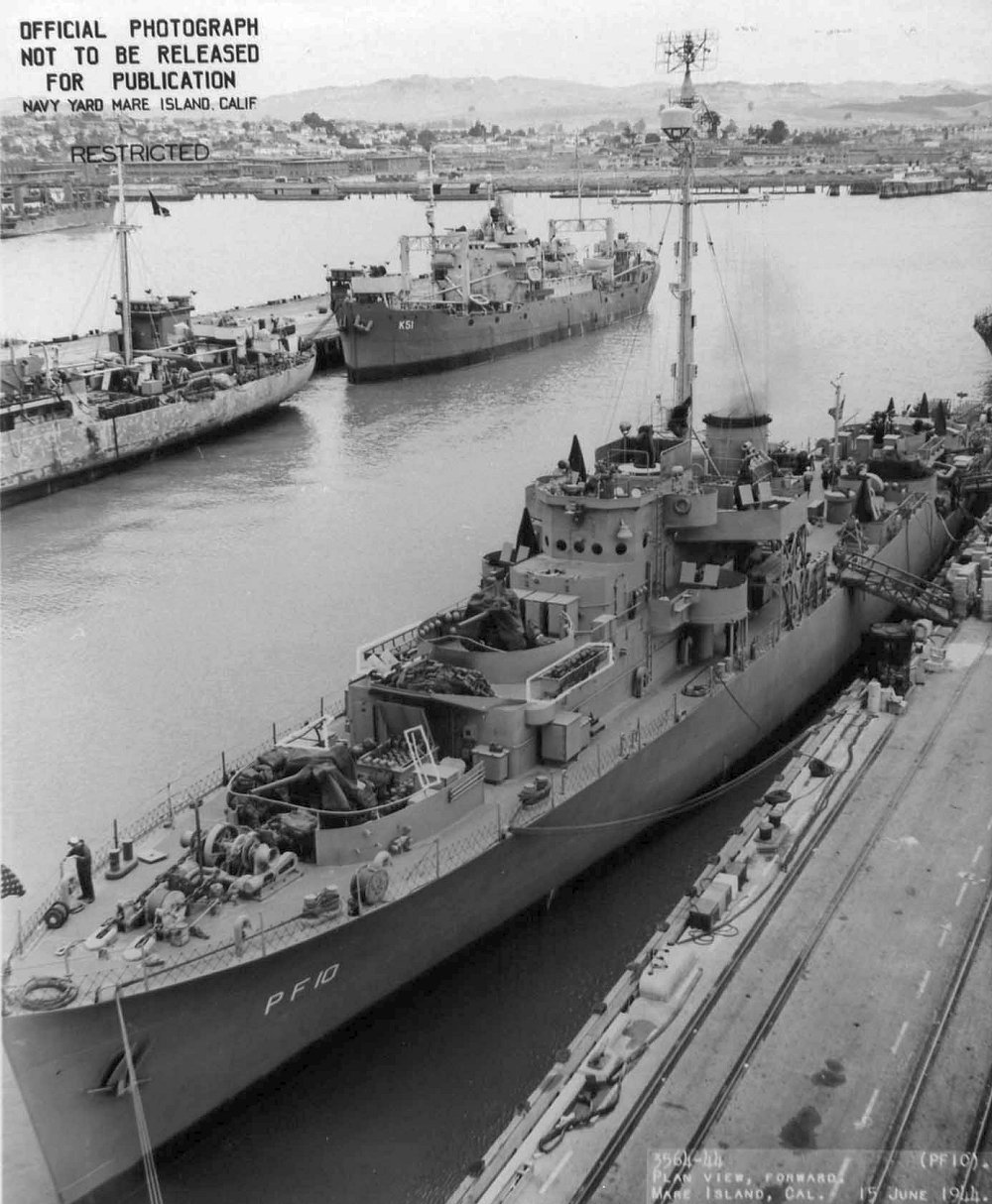
- USS Brownsville (PF-10) at Mare Island on 15 June 1944. In the background are the stern of the French Armed Merchant Cruiser Cap Des Palmes and USS Aries (AK-51)

History

United States
- Name: Brownsville
- Namesake: City of Brownsville, Texas
- Reclassified: Patrol Frigate (PF), 15 April 1943
- Ordered: as a Type S2-S2-AQ1 hull, MCE hull 1428
- Builder: Permanente Metals Richmond Shipyard #4, Richmond, California
- Yard number: 53
- Laid down: 14 September 1943
- Launched: 14 November 1943
- Commissioned: 6 May 1944
- Decommissioned: 15 April 1946
- Identification: Hull symbol: PG-118; Hull symbol: PF-10; Call sign: NPDO
- Fate: Loaned to the US Coast Guard

United States
- Name: Brownsville
- Commissioned: April 1946
- Decommissioned: 2 August 1946
- Stricken: 25 September 1946
- Fate: Sold for scrapping, 30 September 1947

General characteristics
- Class & type: Tacoma-class frigate patrol frigate
- Displacement: 1,430 long tons (1,450 t) (light load); 2,415 long tons (2,454 t) (full load)
- Length: 303 ft 11 in (92.63 m)
- Beam: 37 ft 6 in (11.43 m)
- Draft: 13 ft 8 in (4.17 m)
- Installed power: 2 × 3-Drum express boilers , 240 psi (1,700 kPa); 5,500 ihp (4,100 kW)
- Propulsion: 2 × Vertical triple-expansion steam engine; 2 × shafts
- Speed: 20.3 kn (37.6 km/h; 23.4 mph)
- Complement: 190
- Armament: 3 × 3 in (76 mm)/50 caliber dual-purpose (DP) gun; 2 × twin 40 mm (1.57 in) Bofors anti-aircraft (AA) gun mounts; 9 × 20 mm (0.79 in) Oerlikon cannon AA gun mounts; 2 × Depth charge tracks; 8 × Depth charge projectors; 1 × Hedgehog

USS Brownsville (PG-118/PF-10), a Tacoma-class patrol frigate, was the only ship of the United States Navy to be named for Brownsville, Texas.

== Construction and commissioning ==
Brownsville, originally classified as patrol gunboat, PG-118, was reclassified as a patrol frigate, PF-10, on 15 April 1943. She was laid down on 14 September 1943, under a Maritime Commission (MARCOM) contract, MC hull 1428, at the Permanente Metals Richmond Shipyard #4, Richmond, California. Brownsville was launched on 14 November 1943, sponsored by Mrs. Lillian Runyon Burney; and commissioned on 6 May 1944.

== Service history ==
=== United States Navy ===
Brownsville completed outfitting at Richmond, between 6 May and 19 June. At the end of this, on 19 June, the patrol frigate headed south to San Diego, where she engaged in a month of shakedown training. On 21 July, she completed that training and began post-shakedown availability at Alameda and Oakland, California. After several extensions, she completed her repair period near the end of September, and reported for duty at San Diego, on 28 September.

Brownsville spent her entire, brief Navy career assigned to the Commander, Western Sea Frontier. From September 1944 to April 1945, she served in the Southern California Sector, operating out of San Diego. She conducted barrier patrols and escorted coastal shipping in addition to amphibious training and anti-submarine warfare exercises. After April 1945, the patrol frigate moved to the Northern California Sector and, after a brief assignment patrolling off the entrance to San Francisco Bay, began weather patrols and planeguard duty out of San Francisco. That duty, punctuated by repair periods at Treasure Island, lasted until 15 April 1946, when she was decommissioned, turned over to the Coast Guard on a loan basis, and commissioned as USCGC Brownsville.

=== United States Coast Guard ===
The Coast Guard made use of her only until the following August. On 2 August 1946, she was decommissioned once more and later returned to the Navy. Declared surplus to the needs of the Navy, Brownsville was berthed at Seattle, Washington, for more than a year. Her name was struck from the Navy List on 25 September 1946, and she was sold to the Franklin Shipwrecking Company on 30 September 1947, for scrapping.

== Bibliography ==
- "Brownsville". Dictionary of American Naval Fighting Ships. Naval History and Heritage Command. 28 November 2005. This article incorporates text from this source, which is in the public domain.
- "Kaiser Permanente No. 4, Richmond CA". ShipbuildingHistory.com. 5 February 2014.
- "Brownsville (PF 10)". NavSource.
