= USS Hutchinson =

Tacoma-class patrol frigate

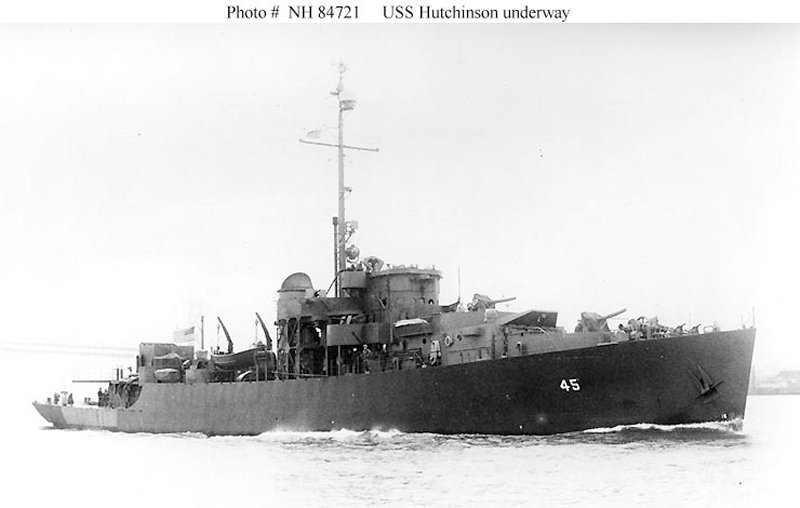
- USS Hutchinson (PF-45) c. February 1946

History

United States
- Name: Hutchinson
- Namesake: City of Hutchinson, Kansas
- Reclassified: PF-45, 15 April 1943
- Builder: Consolidated Steel Corporation, Wilmington, Los Angeles
- Yard number: 530
- Laid down: 28 July 1943
- Launched: 27 August 1943
- Sponsored by: Mrs. A. T. Cole
- Commissioned: 3 February 1944
- Decommissioned: 23 September 1946
- Stricken: 29 October 1946
- Honors and awards: 2 × battle stars, World War II
- Fate: Transferred to Mexican Navy, 24 November 1947

Mexico
- Name: California
- Acquired: 24 November 1947
- Fate: Scrapped, 1964

General characteristics
- Class & type: Tacoma-class frigate
- Displacement: 1,430 long tons (1,453 t) light; 2,415 long tons (2,454 t) full
- Length: 303 ft 11 in (92.63 m)
- Beam: 37 ft 6 in (11.43 m)
- Draft: 13 ft 8 in (4.17 m)
- Propulsion: 2 × 5,500 shp (4,101 kW) turbines; 3 boilers; 2 shafts
- Speed: 20 knots (37 km/h; 23 mph)
- Complement: 190
- Armament: 3 × 3"/50 dual purpose guns (3x1); 4 x 40 mm guns (2×2); 9 × 20 mm guns (9×1); 1 × Hedgehog anti-submarine mortar; 8 × Y-gun depth charge projectors; 2 × Depth charge tracks

USS Hutchinson (PF-45), a Tacoma-class frigate, was the only ship of the United States Navy to be named for Hutchinson, Kansas.

== Construction ==
Hutchinson (PF-45), originally designated PG-153, was launched on 27 August 1943, at the Consolidated Steel Corporation shipyard in Los Angeles, California, under Maritime Commission contract, sponsored by Mrs. A. T. Cole; and commissioned on 3 February 1944, with Commander C. H. Stober, USCG commanding.

== Service history ==
The frigate engaged in shakedown training until 13 April 1944, and departed San Pedro, Los Angeles, on 30 April for the southwest Pacific. She arrived via Pearl Harbor at one of the most important bodies of water in the Pacific area at that time, Leyte Gulf, on 10 November. There Hutchinson took up escort and patrol duties among the many transports supporting the landing. During her stay off Leyte the ship engaged in several battles with attacking Japanese aircraft. Hutchinson sailed for Fremantle, Western Australia, via New Guinea, on 30 November 1944.

Assigned to the submarine base, Fremantle, for training duty with submarines, Hutchinson remained in Australia until 27 August 1945. Departing for the United States, she touched at Manus and Pearl before arriving at Terminal Island, California, on 10 January 1946. Here she converted to a weather ship. Following conversion, she proceeded to Seattle, Washington, and got underway on 6 February 1946 for weather station A in the northern Pacific. During the ship's four months on weather patrol in the Bering Straits and off the coast of Alaska it encountered the tsunami generated by the 1 April 1946 Aleutian Islands earthquake. The event took place after midnight near Rat Island in the Aleutian Islands chain. The sonar man alerted the bridge as the wave approached. The ship slammed head first into the huge wave which towered over the bridge. Everything tied down on the ship's exterior was swept away including all of the life boats and rafts. There was a hole in the deck where the #1 gun had been torn loose and where sea water poured in. Five seam splits opened in the ship's hull. The ship limped back to San Francisco, met by seagoing tugs about halfway there. The ship was decommissioned at Treasure Island. After performing the demanding and essential task of weather picket for two separate periods, Hutchinson sailed to San Francisco, California, and decommissioned there on 15 April 1946. She was then recommissioned a Coast Guard vessel on loan from the Navy, and sailed westward to take up her weather ship duties once more. After two more such cruises, Hutchinson arrived Seattle in early September and decommissioned on 23 September 1946.

Hutchinson was stricken from the Navy List on 29 October 1946, and was sold to Mexico 24 November 1947. She served the Mexican Navy as California until she was scrapped in June 1964.

Hutchinson received two battle stars for World War II service.
