= HMS Sarawak =

Colony-class frigate

History

United States
- Name: Patton
- Namesake: British name assigned in anticipation of ship's transfer to United Kingdom
- Reclassified: Patrol frigate, PF-87, 15 April 1943
- Builder: Walsh-Kaiser Company, Providence, Rhode Island
- Laid down: 29 September 1943
- Renamed: Sarawak, 1943
- Namesake: Sarawak
- Launched: 25 October 1943
- Identification: PG-195
- Fate: Transferred to United Kingdom, 7 February 1944
- Acquired: Returned by United Kingdom, 31 May 1946
- Fate: Scrapped, 1947

United Kingdom
- Name: Sarawak
- Namesake: Sarawak
- Commissioned: 7 February 1944
- Decommissioned: 1945
- Identification: Pennant number: K591
- Fate: Returned to United States, 31 May 1946

General characteristics
- Class & type: Colony/Tacoma-class patrol frigate
- Displacement: 1,264 long tons (1,284 t)
- Length: 303 ft 11 in (92.63 m)
- Beam: 37 ft 6 in (11.43 m)
- Draft: 13 ft 8 in (4.17 m)
- Propulsion: 3 × boilers; 2 × turbines, 5,500 shp (4,100 kW) each; 2 shafts
- Speed: 20 knots (37 km/h; 23 mph)
- Complement: 190
- Armament: 3 × single 3 in (76 mm)/50 cal. AA guns; 2 × twin 40 mm guns; 9 × single 20 mm; 1 × Hedgehog anti-submarine mortar; 8 × Y-gun depth charge projectors; 2 × depth charge racks

HMS Sarawak (K591) was a Colony-class frigate of the United Kingdom that served during World War II. She originally was ordered by the United States Navy as the Tacoma-class patrol frigate USS Patton (PF-87) and was transferred to the Royal Navy prior to completion.

== Construction and acquisition ==
The ship, originally designated a "patrol gunboat," PG-195, was ordered by the United States Maritime Commission under a United States Navy contract as USS Patton. She was reclassified as a "patrol frigate," PF-87, on 15 April 1943 and laid down by the Walsh-Kaiser Company at Providence, Rhode Island, on 29 September 1943. (Note: Uboat.net and Friedman give 28 September 1943.) Intended for transfer to the United Kingdom, the ship was renamed Sarawak by the British prior to launching and was launched on 25 October 1943. She was completed on 7 February 1944.

== Service history ==
Transferred to the United Kingdom under Lend-Lease on 7 February 1944, the ship served in the Royal Navy as HMS Sarawak (K591) (Note: Friedman gives a date of 25 July 1944.) until decommissioned in 1945.

== Disposal ==
The United Kingdom returned Sarawak to the U.S. Navy on 31 May 1946. She was scrapped in 1947.
