= USS Alexandria (PF-18) =

Tacoma-class patrol frigate

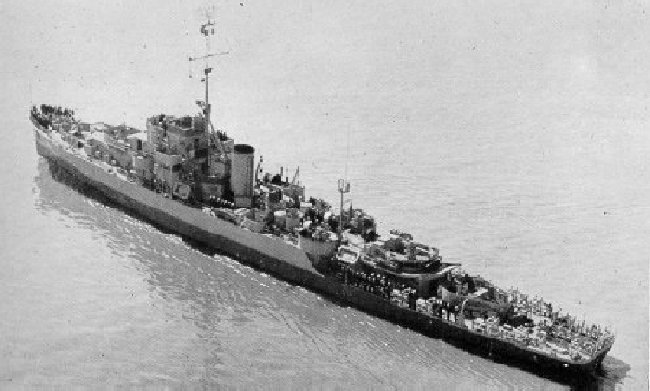
- USS Alexandria (PF-18)

History

United States
- Name: Alexandria
- Namesake: City of Alexandria, Virginia
- Builder: American Ship Building Company, Lorain, Ohio
- Laid down: 23 June 1943
- Launched: 15 January 1944
- Commissioned: 11 March 1945
- Decommissioned: 10 April 1946
- Stricken: 21 May 1946
- Fate: Sold for scrapping, 18 April 1947

General characteristics
- Class & type: Tacoma-class frigate
- Displacement: 1,430 long tons (1,453 t) light; 2,415 long tons (2,454 t) full
- Length: 303 ft 11 in (92.63 m)
- Beam: 37 ft 11 in (11.56 m)
- Draft: 13 ft 8 in (4.17 m)
- Propulsion: 2 × 5,500 shp (4,101 kW) turbines; 3 boilers; 2 shafts
- Speed: 20 knots (37 km/h; 23 mph)
- Complement: 190
- Armament: 3 × 3"/50 dual purpose guns (3x1); 4 x 40 mm guns (2×2); 9 × 20 mm guns (9×1); 1 × Hedgehog anti-submarine mortar; 8 × Y-gun depth charge projectors; 2 × Depth charge tracks

USS Alexandria (PF-18), originally classified PG-126, a Tacoma-class frigate, was the second ship of the United States Navy to hold that name, but it was the first to be named for the city of Alexandria, Virginia.

== Construction ==
The second Alexandria (PF-18) was laid down under a Maritime Commission contract (MC hull 1848) on 23 June 1943, at the American Ship Building Company in Lorain, Ohio; launched on 15 January 1944, sponsored by Mrs. J. Leslie Hall; and towed down the Mississippi River to New Orleans, Louisiana, where she was fitted out and then commissioned on 11 March 1945.

== Service history ==
Alexandria conducted shakedown and anti-submarine warfare (ASW) training out of Guantánamo Bay, Cuba, in late March and early April. She concluded shakedown on 19 April and put into the Norfolk Navy Yard on the 22nd to begin post-shakedown availability. Her repairs were finished on 4 May, and three days later, the war in Europe ended. The latter event obviated the primary mission for which she had been constructed, prosecution of the Battle of the Atlantic against German U-boats. Thus, when she reported for duty with the Commander, Destroyers, Atlantic Fleet, on 15 May, the patrol frigate received an alternative assignment as a weather ship. After receiving modifications at the Charleston Navy Yard, she began weather patrol duty off the Newfoundland coast late in June 1945.

That duty, broken only by a visit to Alexandria, Virginia, in late October and early November, lasted until February 1946 when the ship was declared surplus to the needs of the Navy. She arrived at the Boston Naval Shipyard on 12 February and remained there just under one month. On 12 March, Alexandria arrived in Norfolk, Virginia, where she was decommissioned on 10 April 1946. Her name was struck from the Navy list on 21 May 1946. On 18 April 1947, the former patrol frigate was sold to the Sun Shipbuilding & Drydock Company of Chester, Pennsylvania, for scrapping.
