= USS Gulfport (PF-20) =

Tacoma-class patrol frigate

History

United States
- Name: Gulfport
- Namesake: City of Gulfport, Mississippi
- Builder: American Ship Building Company, Lorain, Ohio
- Launched: 21 August 1943
- Commissioned: 16 September 1944
- Decommissioned: 28 May 1946
- Stricken: 19 June 1946
- Fate: Sold for scrapping, 13 November 1947

General characteristics
- Class & type: Tacoma-class frigate
- Displacement: 1,430 long tons (1,453 t) light; 2,415 long tons (2,454 t) full
- Length: 303 ft 11 in (92.63 m)
- Beam: 37 ft 11 in (11.56 m)
- Draft: 13 ft 8 in (4.17 m)
- Propulsion: 2 × 5,500 shp (4,101 kW) turbines; 3 boilers; 2 shafts
- Speed: 20 knots (37 km/h; 23 mph)
- Complement: 190
- Armament: 3 × 3"/50 dual purpose guns (3x1); 4 x 40 mm guns (2×2); 9 × 20 mm guns (9×1); 1 × Hedgehog anti-submarine mortar; 8 × Y-gun depth charge projectors; 2 × Depth charge tracks

USS Gulfport (PF-20), a Tacoma-class frigate, was the second ship of the United States Navy to be named for Gulfport, Mississippi.

== Construction ==
Gulfport (PF-20), a frigate, originally classified PG-128, was launched on 21 August 1943, at the American Ship Building Company in Cleveland, Ohio, sponsored by Mrs. John C. Chambers; and commissioned at Gulfport, Mississippi, on 16 September 1944.

== Service history ==
Gulfport underwent shakedown at Bermuda, and then returned to Norfolk, Virginia, for training on 2 December 1944. The frigate was soon active as a convoy escort, however, departing with her first convoy from Norfolk to Oran, Algeria, on 18 December. She continued on this vital duty between Algeria and the United States until VE day.

Scheduled for conversion to a weather ship, Gulfport entered the New York Navy Yard on 5 July 1945. Upon completion, she was assigned to the Pacific Fleet, sailing via the Panama Canal and Pearl Harbor to her new home port of Adak, Alaska, where she arrived on 16 September 1945. Gulfport performed weather duties so singularly important in the movements of both ships and aircraft in the Pacific area until decommissioning on 28 May 1946 at Seattle, Washington.

Her name was struck from the Navy List on 19 June 1946, and she was sold to Zidell Ship Dismantling Company for scrap on 13 November 1947 at Seattle.
