= Tacoma-class frigate =

Frigate class of ships of the United States Navy

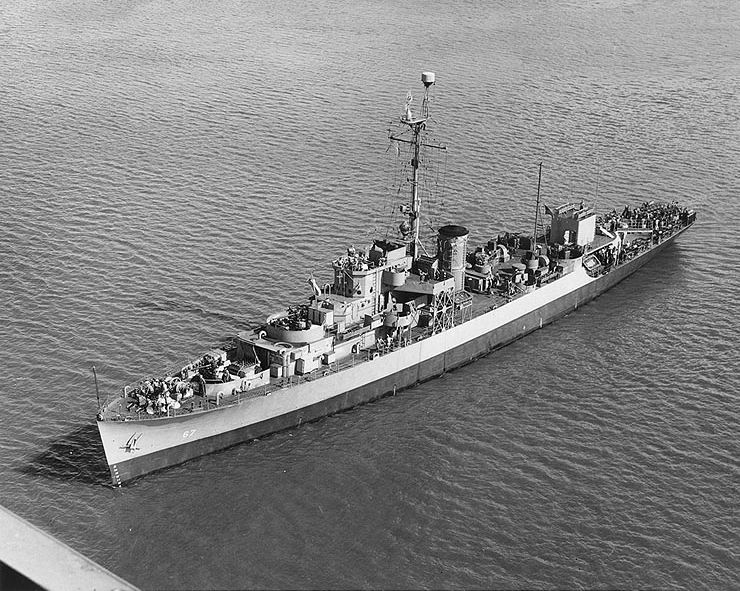
- USS Peoria (PF-67) in June 1945

Class overview
- Name: Tacoma-class frigate
- Builders: American Ship Building Company, Cleveland, Ohio (7 ships) and Lorain, Ohio (6 ships); Consolidated Steel Corporation, Wilmington, California (18 ships); Froemming Brothers, Milwaukee (4 ships); Globe Shipbuilding Company, Superior, Wisconsin (8 ships); Kaiser Cargo, Richmond, California (12 ships); Leathem D. Smith Shipbuilding Company, Sturgeon Bay, Wisconsin (8 ships); Walsh-Kaiser Company, Providence, Rhode Island (21 ships); Walter Butler Shipbuilding Company, Superior, Wisconsin (12 ships)
- Operators: United States Navy; United States Coast Guard; Royal Navy; Soviet Navy; Argentine Navy; Belgian Navy; Colombian National Navy; Cuban Revolutionary Navy; Dominican Navy; Ecuadorian Navy; French Navy; Japan Maritime Self-Defense Force; Republic of Korea Navy; Mexican Navy; Royal Netherlands Navy; Peruvian Navy; Royal Thai Navy
- Preceded by: Asheville-class patrol frigate
- Succeeded by: none
- Subclasses: Colony class
- Cost: $2.3 million
- Built: 1943–1945
- In commission: 1943–2000
- Planned: 100
- Completed: 96
- Canceled: 4
- Lost: 2
- Retired: 94
- Preserved: 3

General characteristics
- Type: Frigate
- Displacement: 1,430 long tons (1,450 t) (light load); 2,415 long tons (2,454 t) (full load)
- Length: 303 ft 11 in (92.63 m)
- Beam: 37 ft 6 in (11.43 m)
- Draft: 13 ft 8 in (4.17 m)
- Installed power: 2 × 3-Drum express boilers , 240 psi (1,700 kPa); 5,500 ihp (4,100 kW)
- Propulsion: 2 × Vertical triple-expansion steam engine; 2 × shafts
- Speed: 20.3 kn (37.6 km/h; 23.4 mph)
- Complement: 190
- Armament: 3 × 3 in (76 mm)/50 caliber dual-purpose (DP) gun; 2 × twin 40 mm (1.57 in) Bofors anti-aircraft (AA) gun mounts; 9 × 20 mm (0.79 in) Oerlikon cannon AA gun mounts; 2 × Depth charge tracks; 8 × Depth charge projectors; 1 × Hedgehog

The Tacoma class was a class of 96 patrol frigates which served in the United States Navy during World War II and the Korean War. Originally classified as gunboats (PG), they were reclassified as patrol frigates (PF) on 15 April 1943. The class is named for its lead ship, Tacoma, a Maritime Commission (MARCOM) S2-S2-AQ1 design, which in turn was named for the city of Tacoma, Washington. Twenty-one ships were transferred to the British Royal Navy, in which they were known as Colony-class frigates, and twenty-eight ships were transferred under Lend-Lease to the Soviet Navy, where they were designated as storozhevoi korabl ("escort ships"), during World War II. All Tacoma-class ships in US service during World War II were crewed by the United States Coast Guard. Tacoma-class ships were transferred to the United States Coast Guard and various navies post-World War II.

== Design ==
In 1942, the success of German submarines against Allied shipping and the shortage of escorts with which to protect Allied sea lines of communication convinced US President Franklin D. Roosevelt of a need to engage mercantile shipbuilders in the construction of warships for escort duty. The United States Maritime Commission (MARCOM), which oversaw the wartime merchant shipbuilding program, proposed to meet this requirement by building a version of the British River-class frigate, a Royal Navy ship type built to mercantile standards in British shipyards experienced in building commercial ships. Two River-class ships under construction in Montreal, Quebec, Canada, as HMS Adur (for the Royal Navy) and HMCS Annan (for the Royal Canadian Navy), were transferred to the US Navy in 1942, prior to completion, as prototypes for the Tacoma class and became the Asheville-class Asheville (PF-1) and Natchez (PF-2), respectively.

The naval architecture firm of Gibbs & Cox, designed the Tacoma class by modifying the River class to American requirements. The Tacoma-class units were designed and armed to serve mostly as anti-submarine warfare (ASW) ships. They were distinguished from the River class primarily by their pole (instead of the British tripod) foremast and lighter main guns, 3-inch (76.2-millimetre)/50 caliber gun instead of the British 4-inch (102-millimetre)/40 caliber gun, and they had an American rather than British powerplant.

The Tacoma-class was designed to take advantage of American construction techniques employing prefabrication. Unlike most other types of warship, the Tacomas, like the Rivers, were built to mercantile standards. With the proven effectiveness of the River class on escort duty, MARCOM's goal was to allow commercial shipyards without prior experience of naval construction standards to build effective warships more cheaply and efficiently. MARCOM had hoped that the US Navy, some members of which doubted that the commercial shipyards could build a sturdy enough warship, would accept them because of the proven service record of the River-class ships which inspired their design.

The resulting ships had a greater range than the superficially similar destroyer escorts, but the US Navy viewed them as decidedly inferior in all other respects. The Tacoma class had a much larger turning circle than a destroyer escort, lacked sufficient ventilation for warm-weather operations – a reflection of their original British design and its emphasis on operations in the North Atlantic Ocean – and were criticized as far too hot below decks, and, because of the mercantile style of their hulls, had far less resistance to underwater explosions than ships built to naval standards like the destroyer escorts.

Like their predecessors Asheville and Natchez, the Tacoma-class ships built for the US Navy all were named after small cities in the United States.

== Construction program ==
In November 1942, MARCOM gave its West Coast Regional Office the responsibility for coordinating the construction of the ships of the Tacoma class, which were to be split between commercial shipyards on the United States West Coast and five shipyards on the Great Lakes, the latter in particular chosen because they had building ways available for use in the Tacoma program. MARCOM tendered a contract to Kaiser Cargo, Inc., of Oakland, California, to prepare detailed specifications based on the Gibbs & Cox design and to manage the overall construction program.

On 8 December 1942, MARCOM contracted for 69 Tacoma-class ships, for which the US Navy dropped the British "corvette" designation in favor of classifying the Tacomas (along with the two Asheville-class ships that preceded them) as "patrol gunboats" (PG); on 15 April 1943, the two Ashevilles and all Tacomas were reclassified as "patrol frigates" (PF). Kaiser Cargo itself received an order for 12 ships; the Consolidated Steel Corporation, of Wilmington, California, received an order for 18; the American Ship Building Company, received an order for 11, with four to be built at Cleveland, Ohio, and eight at Lorain, Ohio; the Walter Butler Shipbuilding Company, of Superior, Wisconsin, received an order for 12; Froemming Brothers, Inc., of Milwaukee, received an order for four; the Globe Shipbuilding Company, of Superior, Wisconsin, received an order for eight; and the Leathem D. Smith Shipbuilding Company, of Sturgeon Bay, Wisconsin, received an order for eight. American Shipbuilding later received an order for another six (four at Cleveland and two at Lorain), bringing the total orders for the US Navy to 79 ships, while the Walsh-Kaiser Company, of Providence, Rhode Island, received an order for 21 additional ships, all of which were to be transferred to the Royal Navy, where they were known as the Colony class, bringing the total planned construction to 100 units. Four ships scheduled for construction at Lorain, by American Shipbuilding, Stamford, Macon, Lorain, and Milledgeville (ex-Vallejo), were cancelled in December 1943 and February 1944, dropping the ultimate total of Tacoma-class ships built to 96.

From the beginning, the construction program was plagued by difficulties which caused it to fall far behind schedule. Unfamiliar with the capabilities of the Great Lakes yards, Kaiser Cargo used prefabrication techniques unsuited to the Great Lakes yards' smaller cranes and had to rework them. Ice prevented patrol frigates built on the Great Lakes from transiting the Soo Locks on the St. Marys River between Lake Superior and Lake Michigan in the winter and spring, requiring them to be floated down the Mississippi River on pontoons to New Orleans or Houston for fitting out, often doubling their construction time. Delays became so lengthy that shipyards began to deliver the ships in such an incomplete state that shakedown and post-shakedown periods of repair and alteration took months for some of them. Bilge keels that cracked in rough seas or cold weather, failures in the welds holding the deckhouse to the deck, engine trouble, and ventilation problems plagued all of the ships. As a result, no Tacoma-class ship was commissioned until late in 1943, none were ready for service until 1944, and the last one, USS Alexandria (PF-18), was not commissioned until March 1945. The ships Consolidated Steel built proved the most reliable, while Kaiser Cargo-built units were the most trouble-prone; among the latter, Tacoma took ten months of shakedown and repairs to be ready after her commissioning, and Pasco proved equally difficult to make ready for service.

== Service ==
By the time the first Tacoma-class ships were ready for front-line service in 1944, the US Navy's requirement for them had passed, thanks to a decline in the threat from Axis submarines, and the availability of ample numbers of destroyers and destroyer escorts, which the Navy regarded as much superior to the Tacoma class. The Navy crewed all of the Tacoma-class ships with United States Coast Guard personnel. The Consolidated Steel-built ships, thanks to their superior reliability and performance, all saw service in the Pacific war zone where one, Rockford, teamed with the minesweeper Ardent to sink the Japanese submarine I-12 in November 1944, but the US Navy generally relegated the patrol frigates to local training and escort responsibilities, and to duty as weather ships, for which the aft-mounted 3-inch gun was removed in order to allow the installation of a weather balloon hangar.

The United States built an additional 21 Tacoma-class ships for the United Kingdom for service in the Royal Navy, where they were known as the Colony class, and all but one of them initially received British names, rather than the names of small US cities, while still US Navy ships; they were returned to the United States between 1946 and 1948. Eighteen of these were quickly scrapped, but two were sold to Egypt, for use as civilian passenger ships, and one to Argentina, for service as a warship in the Argentine Navy.

As a part of Project Hula, a secret 1945 program that transferred 149 US Navy ships to the Soviet Navy at Cold Bay, Alaska, in anticipation of the Soviet Union joining the war against Japan, the US Navy transferred 28 Tacoma-class ships to the Soviet Navy between July and September 1945. They were the largest, most heavily armed, and most expensive ships transferred during the program. At least some of them saw action in the Soviet offensive against Japanese forces in Northeast Asia, in August 1945. The transfer of two more, Annapolis and Bangor, was cancelled when transfers halted on 5 September 1945. One of the transferred ships, EK-3 (ex-Belfast), ran aground and was damaged beyond economical repair in a November 1948 storm off Petropavlovsk-Kamchatsky, but the Soviet Union returned the other 27 frigates to the United States in October and November 1949.

The US Navy quickly decommissioned 23 Tacoma-class ships after the end of World War II, after only very brief US Navy careers, and sold them for scrap in 1947 and 1948, although one, the former Charlotte, was saved from the scrapyard to become a Brazilian merchant ship. The 27 ships the Soviet Union returned in 1949 went into the US Navy's Pacific Reserve Fleet in Japan; 13 of them were recommissioned for US Navy service in the Korean War, but all 27 soon were transferred to the navies of other countries. The other 25 Tacoma-class ships never returned to service in the US Navy and also were transferred to foreign countries. In the post-World War II era, Tacoma-class patrol frigates operated in the Japan Maritime Self-Defense Force, the Republic of Korea Navy, and the Argentine, Belgian, Colombian, Cuban, Dominican, Ecuadorian, French, Mexican, Royal Netherlands, Peruvian, and Royal Thai navies, and one ship operated as a civilian weather ship for the government of the Netherlands. In foreign navies, many Tacoma-class ships survived into the 1960s and 1970s, and the last operator of Tacoma-class patrol frigates, Thailand, did not retire its two ships until 2000.

== List of ships ==
The Tacoma-class ships, listed in order of US Navy hull number, and their dates of active service and fates follow.

Service data
Ship name	Hull no.	Dates of U.S. Navy service	Loan in war	Later loan	Final disposition
Tacoma	PF-3	(1943–1945, 1950–1951)	To Soviet Navy as EK-11 (1945–1949)	To Republic of Korea Navy as ROKS Taedong (PF-63) (1951–1973)	Preserved in South Korea, 1973
Sausalito	PF-4	(1944–1945, 1950–1952)	To Soviet Navy as EK-16 (1945–1949)	To Republic of Korea Navy as ROKS Imchin (PF-66) (1952–1973)	Scrapped, 1973
Hoquiam	PF-5	(1944–1945, 1950–1951)	Soviet Navy as EK-13 (1945–1949)	Republic of Korea Navy as ROKS Nae Tong (PF-65) (1951–1973)	Scrapped, 1973
Pasco	PF-6	(1944–1945)	Soviet Navy as EK-12 (1945–1949)	Japan Maritime Self-Defense Force as JDS Kashi (PF-283) (1953–1967)	South Korea for parts, 1969
Albuquerque	PF-7	(1943–1945, 1950–1953)	Soviet Navy as EK-14 (1945–1949)	Japan Maritime Self-Defense Force as JDS Tochi (PF-296) (1951–1969)	United States for disposal, 1971
Everett	PF-8	(1944–1945, 1950–1953)	Soviet Navy as EK-15 (1945–1949)	Japan Maritime Self-Defense Force as JDS Kiri (PF-291) (1953–1975)	United States for disposal, 1976
Pocatello	PF-9	(1944–1946)			Sold for scrapping, 1947
Brownsville	PF-10	(1944–1946)		To US Coast Guard as USCGC Brownsville (1946)	Sold for scrapping, 1947
Grand Forks	PF-11	(1944–1946)			Sold for scrapping, 1947
Casper	PF-12	(1944–1946)			Sold for scrapping, 1947
Pueblo	PF-13	(1944–1946)		Dominican Navy as Presidente Troncoso (F103) (later Gregorio Luperón) (1948–1979)	Scrapped, 1982
Grand Island	PF-14	(1944–1945)		Cuban Navy as Maximo Gomez (F303) (1947-1970s?)	Unknown
Annapolis	PF-15	(1944–1946)		Mexican Navy as ARM General Vicente Guerrero (later ARM Río Usumacinta) (1947–1964)	Scrapped, 1964
Bangor	PF-16	(1944–1946)		US Coast Guard as USCGC Bangor (1946); To Mexican Navy as ARM General José María Morelos (later ARM Golfo de Tehuantepec)	Scrapped, 1964
Key West	PF-17	(1944–1946)			Sold for scrapping, 1947
Alexandria	PF-18	(1945–1946)			Sold for scrapping, 1947
Huron	PF-19	(1944–1946)			Sold for scrapping, 1947
Gulfport	PF-20	(1944–1946)			Sold for scrapping, 1947
Bayonne	PF-21	(1945, 1950–1953)	Soviet Navy as EK-25 (1945–1949)	Japan Maritime Self-Defense Force as JDS Buna (PF-294) (1953–1965)	Sunk as target, 1968
Gloucester	PF-22	(1943–1945, 1950–1952)	Soviet Navy as EK-26 (1945–1949)	Japan Maritime Self-Defense Force as JDS Tsuge (PF-292) (1953–1968)	United States for disposal, 1969
Shreveport	PF-23	(1943–1946)			Sold for scrapping, 1947
Muskegon	PF-24	(1944–1946)		To US Coast Guard as USCGC Muskegon (1946); French Navy as Mermoz (F714) (1947-late 1950s)	Scrapped, late 1950s
Charlottesville	PF-25	(1944–1945)	Soviet Navy as EK-1 (1945–1949)	Japan Maritime Self-Defense Force as JDS Matsu (PF-286) (1953–1969)	United States for disposal, 1972
Poughkeepsie	PF-26	(1944–1945)	Soviet Navy as EK-27 (1945–1949)	Japanese Merchant Marine (1951), then Japan Maritime Self-Defense Force as JDS Momi (PF-284) (1953–1969)	South Korea for parts, 1969
Newport	PF-27	(1944–1945, 1950–1952)	Soviet Navy as EK-28 (1945–1949)	Japan Maritime Self-Defense Force as JDS Kaede (PF-293) (1953–1972)	United States for disposal, 1975
Emporia	PF-28	(1944–1946)		French Navy as Le Verrier (F716) (1947–1958)	Scrapped, 1958
Groton	PF-29	(1944–1946)		Colombian Navy as ARC Almirante Padilla (F-11) (1947–1965)	Stricken, 1965
Hingham	PF-30	(1944–1946)			Sold for scrapping, 1947
Grand Rapids	PF-31	(1944–1946)			Sold for scrapping, 1947
Woonsocket	PF-32	(1944–1946)		US Coast Guard as USCGC Woonsocket (1946); Peruvian Navy as BAP Teniente Gálvez (F-1) (later BAP Gálvez) (1948–1961)	Scrapped
Dearborn (ex-Toledo)	PF-33	(1944–1946)			Sold for scrapping, 1947
Long Beach	PF-34	(1943–1945)	Soviet Navy as EK-2 (1945–1949)	Japan Maritime Self-Defense Force as JDS Shii (PF-297) (1953–1967)	Scrapped, 1967
Belfast	PF-35	(1944–1945)	Soviet Navy as EK-3 (1945–1948)		Wrecked, 1948
Glendale	PF-36	(1944–1945, 1950–1951)	Soviet Navy as EK-6 (1945–1949)	Royal Thai Navy as HTMS Tachin (PF-1) (1951–2000)	Preserved, 2001
San Pedro	PF-37	(1943–1945)	Soviet Navy as EK-5 (1945–1949)	Japan Maritime Self-Defense Force as JDS Kaya (PF-288) (1953–1967)	To United States for disposal, 1978; sunk as target
Coronado	PF-38	(1943–1945)	Soviet Navy as EK-8 (1945–1949)	Japan Maritime Self-Defense Force as JDS Sugi (PF-285) (1953–1969)	To United States for disposal, 1971
Ogden	PF-39	(1943–1945)	Soviet Navy as EK-10 (1945–1949)	Japan Maritime Self-Defense Force as JDS Kusu (PF-281) (1953–1976)	To United States for disposal, 1977
Eugene	PF-40	(1944–1946)		Cuban Navy as José Martí (F301) (1947–1976)	Scrapped, 1976
El Paso	PF-41	(1943–1946)			Sold for scrapping, 1947
Van Buren	PF-42	(1943–1946)			Sold for scrapping, 1947
Orange	PF-43	(1944–1946)			Sold, 1947; scrapped, 1948
Corpus Christi	PF-44	(1944–1946)			Sold for scrapping, 1947
Hutchinson	PF-45	(1944–1946)		Mexican Navy as ARM California (1947–1964)	Sold for scrapping, 1964
Bisbee	PF-46	(1944–1945, 1950–1951)	Soviet Navy as EK-17 (1945–1949)	Colombian Navy as ARC Capitán Tono (F-12) (1952–1963)	Scrapped, 1963
Gallup	PF-47	(1944–1945, 1950–1951)	Soviet Navy as EK-22 (1945–1949)	Royal Thai Navy as HTMS Prasae (PF-2) (1951–2000)	Preserved, 2000
Rockford	PF-48	(1944–1945)	Soviet Navy as EK-18 (1945–1949)	Republic of Korea Navy as ROKS Apnok (PF-62) (1950–1952)	To United States for disposal, 1952; sunk as target, 1953
Muskogee	PF-49	(1944–1945)	Soviet Navy as EK-19 (1945–1949)	Republic of Korea Navy as ROKS Duman (PF-61) (1950)	Unknown
Carson City	PF-50	(1944–1945)	Soviet Navy as EK-20 (1945–1949)	Japan Maritime Self-Defense Force as JDS Sakura (PF-290) (1953–1971)	Sold for scrapping, 1971
Burlington	PF-51	(1944–1945, 1951–1952)	Soviet Navy as EK-21 (1945–1949)	Colombian Navy as ARC Almirante Brión (F-14) (1953–1968)	Scrapped, 1968
Allentown	PF-52	(1944–1945)	Soviet Navy as EK-9 (1945–1949)	Japan Maritime Self-Defense Force as JDS Ume (PF-289) (1953–1970)	To United States for disposal, 1971
Machias	PF-53	(1944–1945)	Soviet Navy as EK-4 (1945–1949)	Japan Maritime Self-Defense Force as JDS Nara (PF-282) (1953–1966)	Sold for scrapping, 1969
Sandusky	PF-54	(1944–1945)	Soviet Navy as EK-7 (1945–1949)	Japan Maritime Self-Defense Force as JDS Nire (PF-287) (1953–1970)	To United States for disposal, 1970
Bath	PF-55	(1944–1945)	Soviet Navy as EK-29 (1945–1949)	Japan Maritime Self-Defense Force as JDS Maki (PF-298) (1953–1971)	Sold for scrapping, 1971
Covington	PF-56	(1944–1946)		US Coast Guard as USCGC Covington (1946); Ecuadorian Navy as BAE Guayas (E-21) (1947–1972)	Stricken, 1974
Sheboygan	PF-57	(1944–1946)		Belgian Navy as Lieutenant ter zee Victor Billet (F910) (1947–1957)	Scrapped, 1959
Abilene (ex-Bridgeport)	PF-58	(1944–1946)		the Netherlands civilian government as SS Cirrus (1947–1969)	Sold for scrapping, 1969
Beaufort	PF-59	(1944–1946)			Sold for scrapping, 1947
Charlotte	PF-60	(1944–1946)			Sold, 1947; became Brazilian coastal passenger ship; scrapped 1965
Manitowoc	PF-61	(1944–1946)		US Coast Guard as USCGC Manitowoc (1946); French Navy as Le Brix (F715) (1947–1958)	Scrapped, 1958
Gladwyne (ex-Worcester)	PF-62	(1944–1946)		Mexican Navy as ARM Papaloapan (1947–1965)	Scrapped, 1965
Moberly (ex-Scranton)	PF-63	(1944–1946)			Sold for scrapping, 1947
Knoxville	PF-64	(1944–1946)		Dominican Navy as Presidente Peynado (F104) (later Capitán General Pedro Santana) (1947–1979)	Scrapped, 1979
Uniontown (ex-Chattanooga)	PF-65	(1944–1945)		Argentine Navy as ARA Sarandí (P-33) (1947–1968)	Unknown
Reading	PF-66	(1944–1946)		Argentine Navy as ARA Heroína (P-32) (1947–1966)	Scrapped, 1966
Peoria	PF-67	(1945–1946)		Cuban Navy as Cuban frigate Antonio Maceo (F302) (1947–1975)	Sunk as target, 1975
Brunswick	PF-68	(1944–1946)			Sold for scrapping, 1947
Davenport	PF-69	(1945–1946)			Sold for scrapping, 1946
Evansville	PF-70	(1944–1945, 1950–1953)	Soviet Navy as EK-30 (1945–1949)	Japan Maritime Self-Defense Force as JDS Keyaki (PF-295) (1953–1976)	To United States for disposal, 1976; scrapped, 1977
New Bedford	PF-71	(1944–1946)			Sold for scrapping, 1947
Hallowell (ex-Machias)	PF-72		1943–1946 Royal Navy as HMS Anguilla (K500)		Returned to United States, 1946; sold for scrapping, 1947
Hamond	PF-73		1943–1946 Royal Navy as HMS Antigua (K501)		Returned to United States, 1946; sold for scrapping
Hargood	PF-74		1943–1946 Royal Navy as HMS Ascension (K502)		Returned to United States, 1946; sold for scrapping, 1947
Hotham	PF-75		1943–1946 Royal Navy as HMS Bahamas (K503))		Returned to United States, 1946; sold for scrapping, 1947
Halstead	PF-76		1943–1946 Royal Navy as HMS Barbados (K504)		Returned to United States, 1946; sold for scrapping, 1947
Hannam	PF-77		1943–1945 Royal Navy as HMS Caicos (K505)	To Argentine Navy as ARA Trinidad (P-34) / ARA Santísima Trinidad / ARA Comodoro Augusto Lasserre (Q-9) (1947–1969)	Scrapped, 1971
Harland	PF-78		1944–1946 Royal Navy as HMS Cayman (K506)		Returned to United States 1946; sold for scrapping 1947
Harman	PF-79		1944–1946 Royal Navy as HMS Dominica (K507)		Returned to United States, 1946; sold for scrapping, 1947
Harvey	PF-80		1944–1946 Royal Navy as HMS Labuan (K584) (ex-Gold Coast)		Returned to United States 1946; sold for scrapping 1957
Holmes	PF-81		1944–1946 Royal Navy as HMS Tobago (K585) (ex-Hong Kong)		Returned to United States, 1946; Egyptian civilian passenger ship, 1950–1956; sunk as blockship, 1956
Hornby	PF-82		1944–1946 Royal Navy as HMS Montserrat (K586)		Returned to United States, 1946; sold for scrapping, 1947
Hoste	PF-83		1944–1946 Royal Navy as HMS Nyasaland (K587)		Returned to United States, 1946; sold for scrapping, 1947
Howett	PF-84		1944–1946 Royal Navy as HMS Papua (K588)		Returned to United States, 1946; sold, 1947; Egyptian passenger vessel, 1950–1956
Pilford	PF-85		1944–1946 Royal Navy as HMS Pitcairn (K589)		Returned to United States, 1946; sold for scrapping, 1947
Pasley (later St. Helena)	PF-86		1944–1946 Royal Navy as HMS St. Helena (K590)		Returned to United States, 1946; sold for scrapping, 1947
Patton	PF-87		1944–1946 Royal Navy as HMS Sarawak (K591)		Returned to United States, 1946; sold for scrapping, 1947
Pearl	PF-88		1944–1946 Royal Navy as HMS Seychelles (K592)		Returned to United States, 1946; sold for scrapping, 1947
Phillimore	PF-89		1944–1946 Royal Navy as HMS Perim (K593) (ex-Sierra Leone)		Returned to United States, 1946; sold for scrapping, 1947
Popham	PF-90		1944–1946 Royal Navy as HMS Somaliland (K594)		Returned to United States, 1946; sold for scrapping, 1947
Peyton	PF-91		1944–1946 Royal Navy as HMS Tortola (K595)		Returned to United States, 1946; sold for scrapping, 1947
Prowse	PF-92		1944–1946 Royal Navy as HMS Zanzibar (K596)		Returned to United States, 1946; sold for scrapping, 1947
Lorain (ex-Roanoke)	PF-93	(1945–1946)		French Navy as La Place (F713) (1947–1950)	Sunk by mine, 1950
Milledgeville (ex-Sitka)	PF-94	(1945–1946)			Sold, 1947; scrapped, 1948
Stamford	PF-95	—N/a	—N/a	—N/a	Cancelled, 31 December 1943
Macon	PF-96	—N/a	—N/a	—N/a	Cancelled, 31 December 1943
Lorain (ex-Vallejo)	PF-97	—N/a	—N/a	—N/a	Cancelled, 11 February 1944
Milledgeville	PF-98	—N/a	—N/a	—N/a	Cancelled, 31 December 1943
Orlando	PF-99	(1944–1946)			Sold for scrapping, 1947
Racine	PF-100	(1945–1946)			Sold for scrapping, 1947
Greensboro	PF-101	(1945–1946)			Sold for scrapping, 1948
Forsyth	PF-102	(1945–1946)		To US Coast Guard as USCGC Forsyth (1946); To the Netherlands civilian government as SS Cumulus (1947–1963)	Scrapped, 1969

== Gallery ==
=== Tacoma-class patrol frigates, US Navy ===
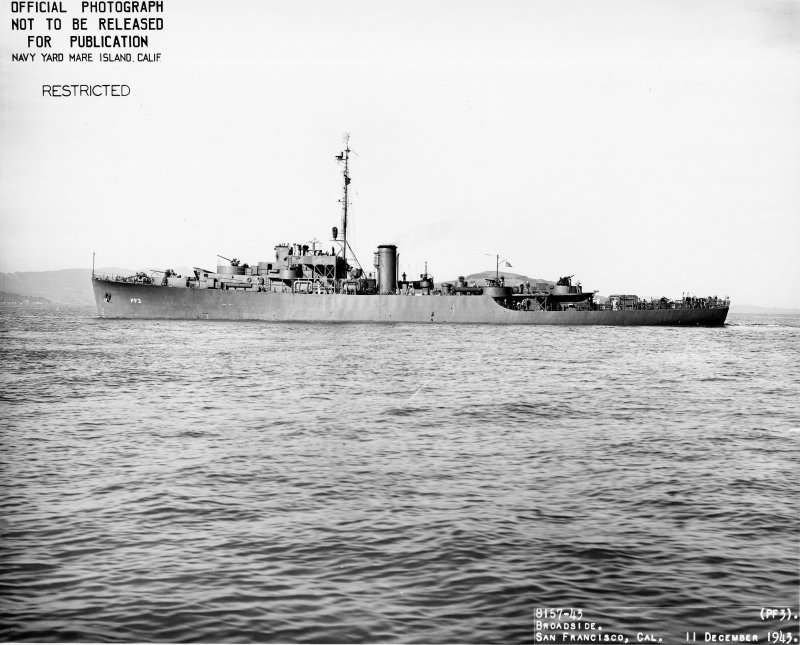
USS Tacoma (PF-3)

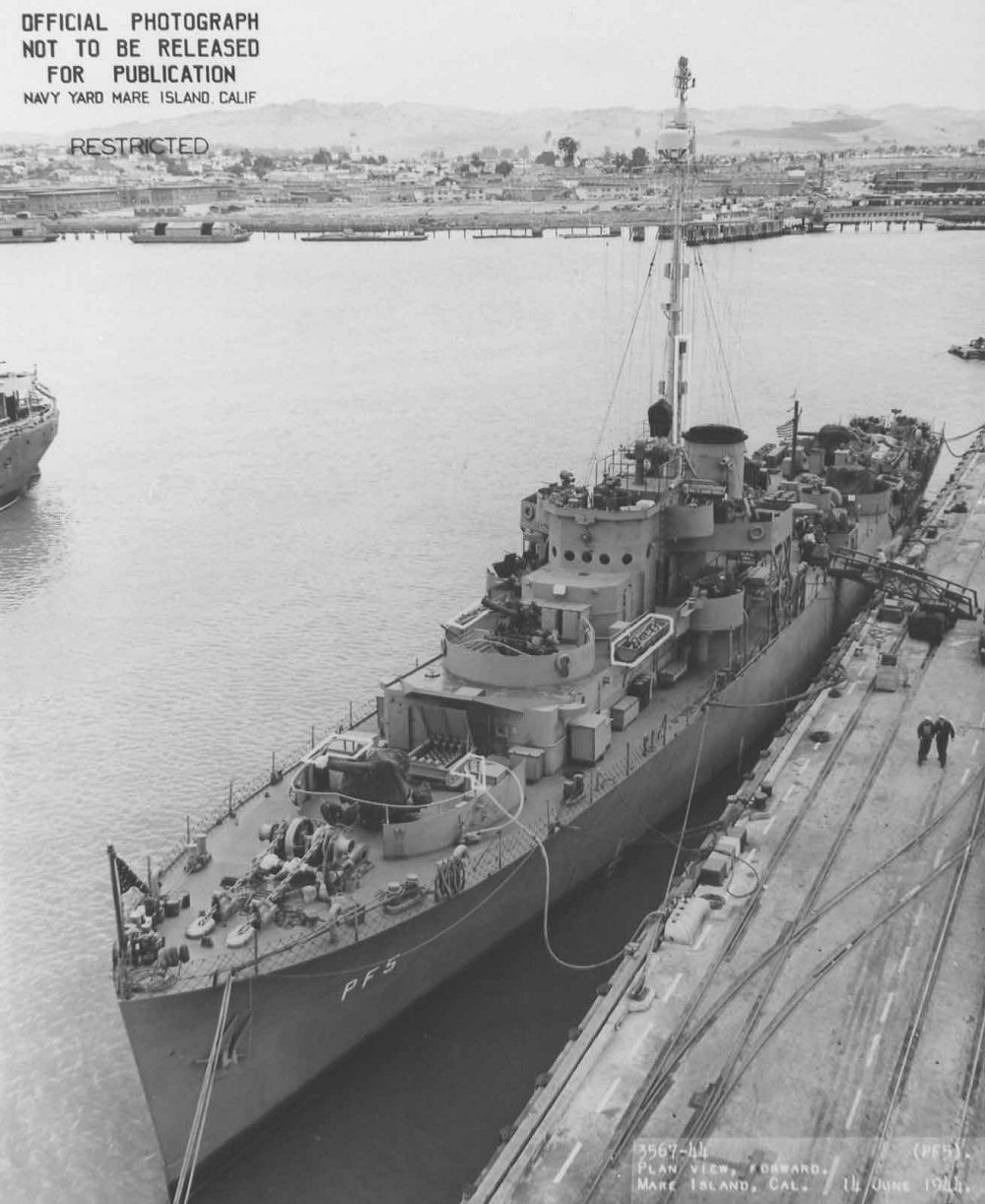
USS Hoquiam (PF-5)

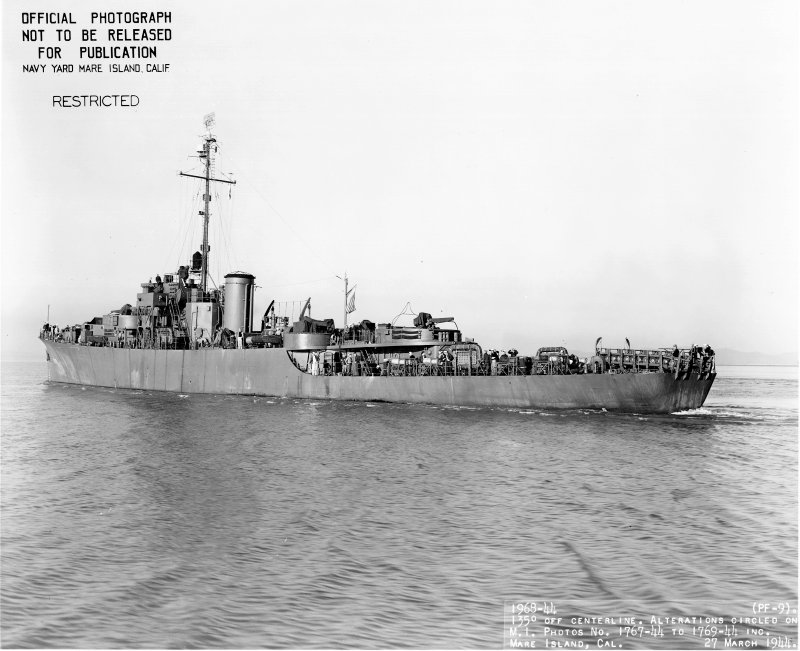
USS Pocatello (PF-9)

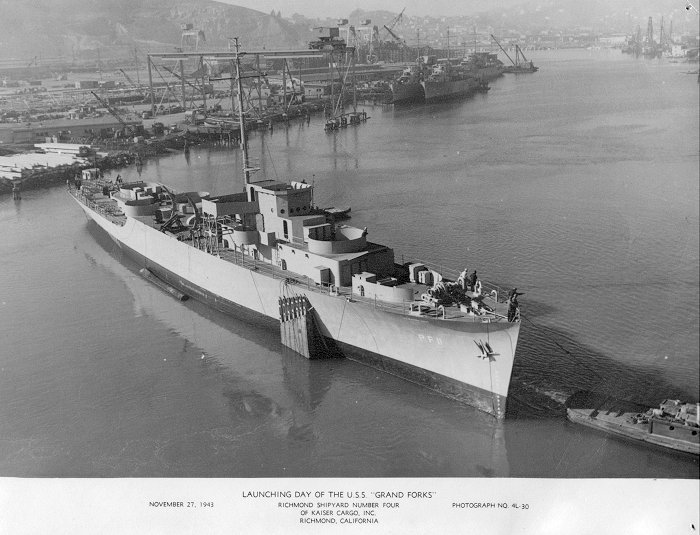
USS Grand Forks (PF-11)

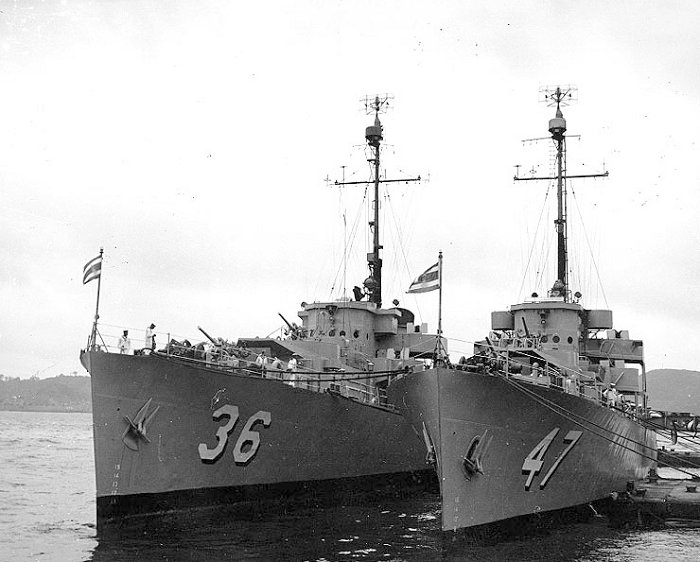
USS Glendale (PF-36) (left) and USS Gallup (PF-47)

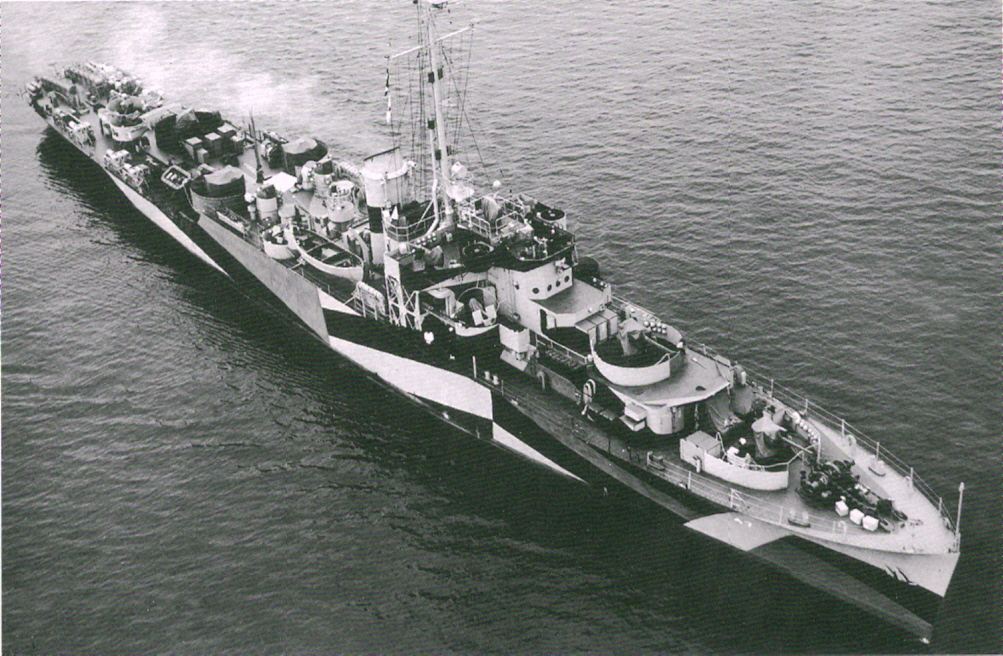
USS Gallup (PF-47)

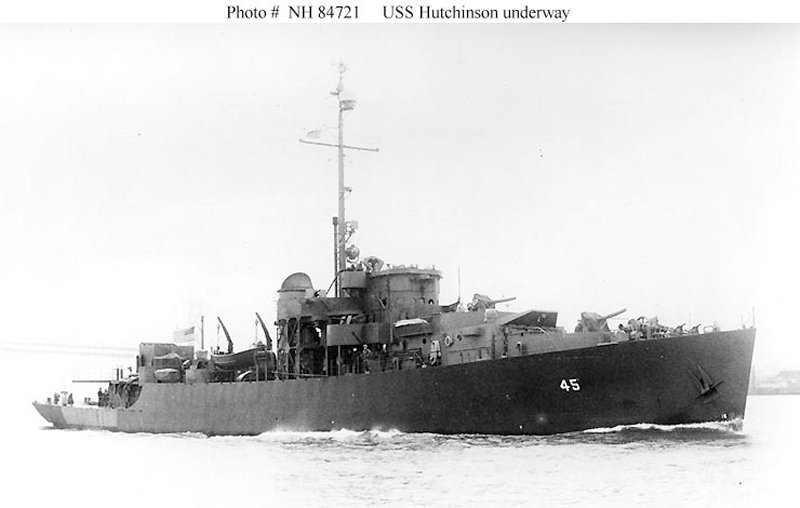
USS Hutchinson (PF-45)

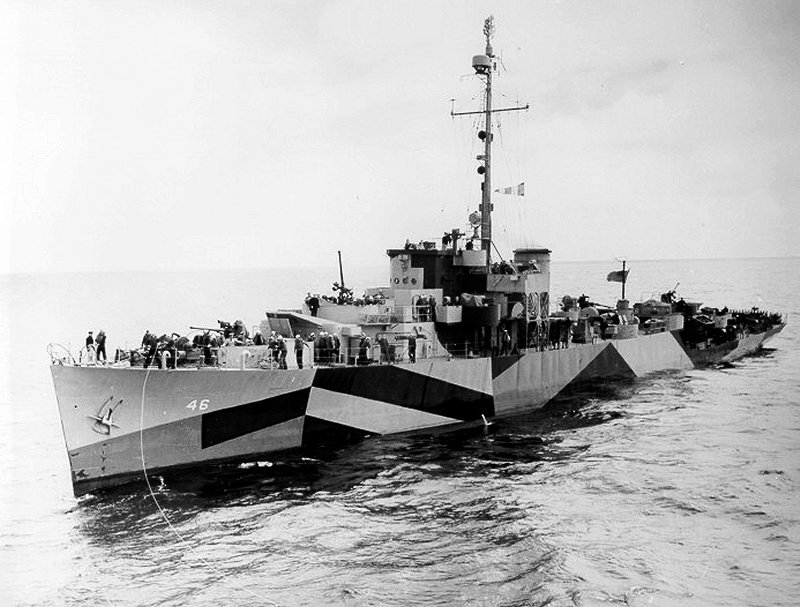
USS Bisbee (PF-46)

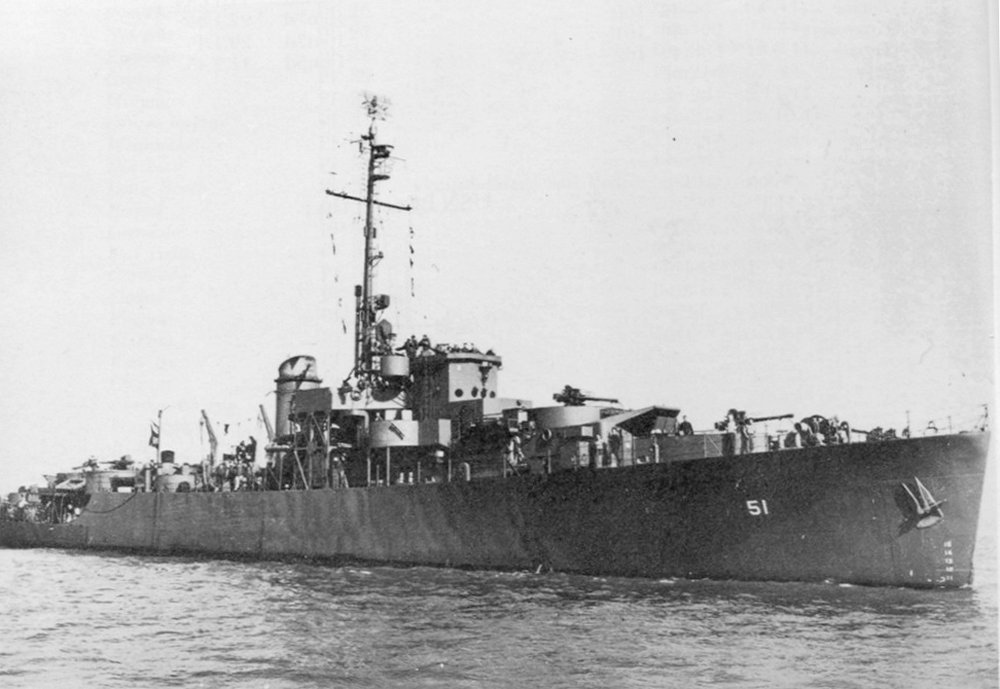
USS Burlington (PF-51)

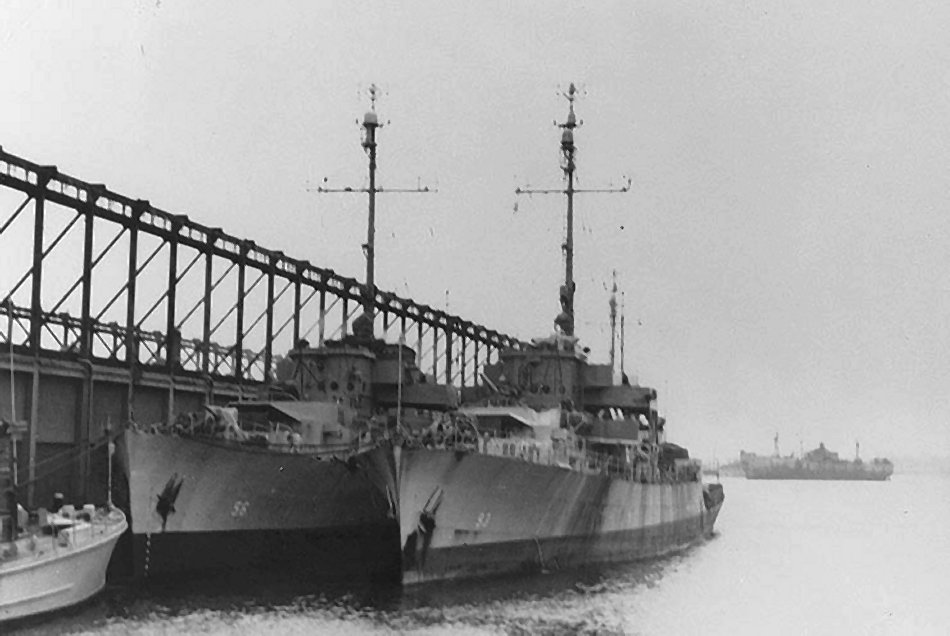
USS Covington (PF-56) (left) and USS Lorain (PF-93)

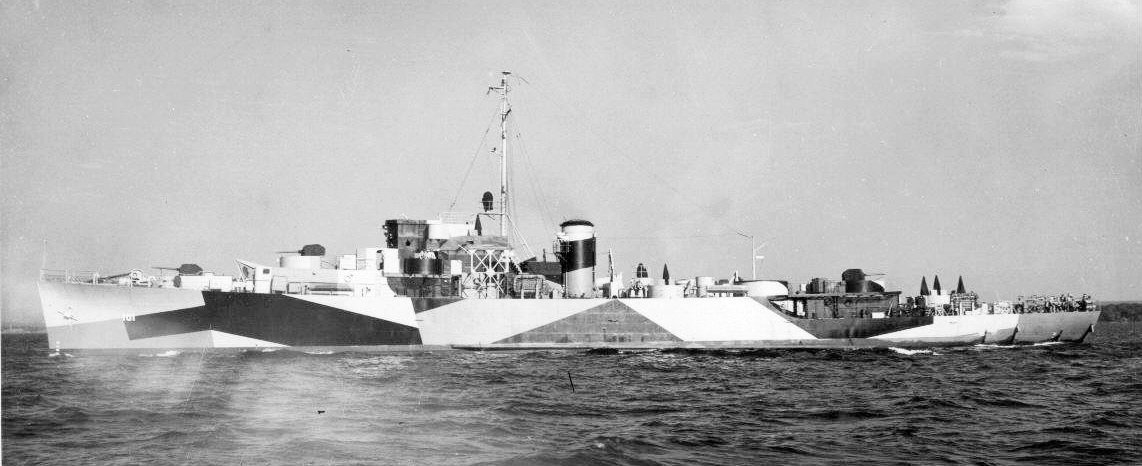
USS Greensboro (PF-101)

=== Colony-class frigates, Royal Navy ===
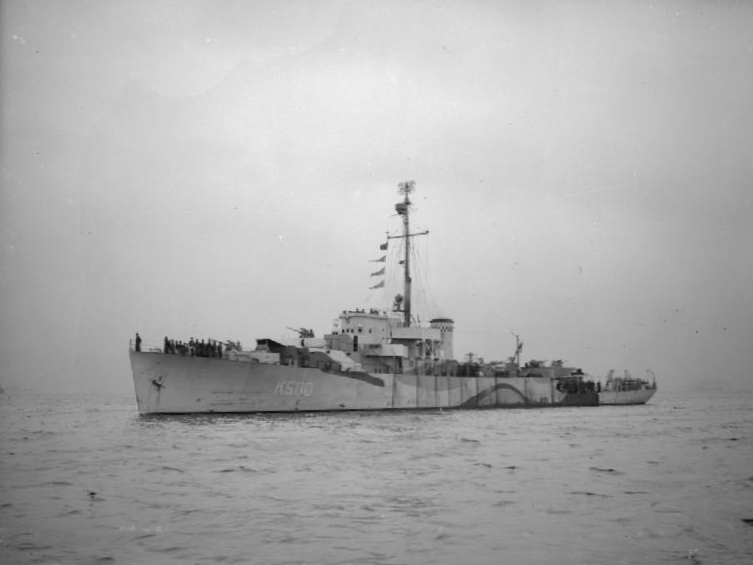
HMS Anguilla (K500)

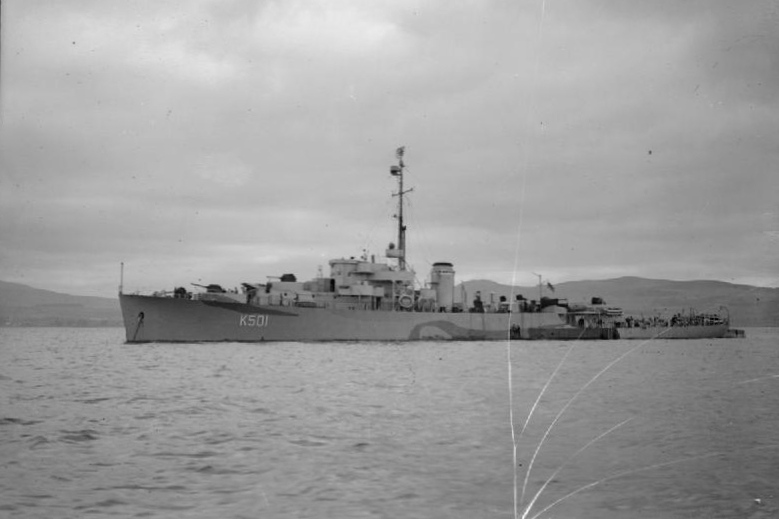
HMS Antigua (K501)

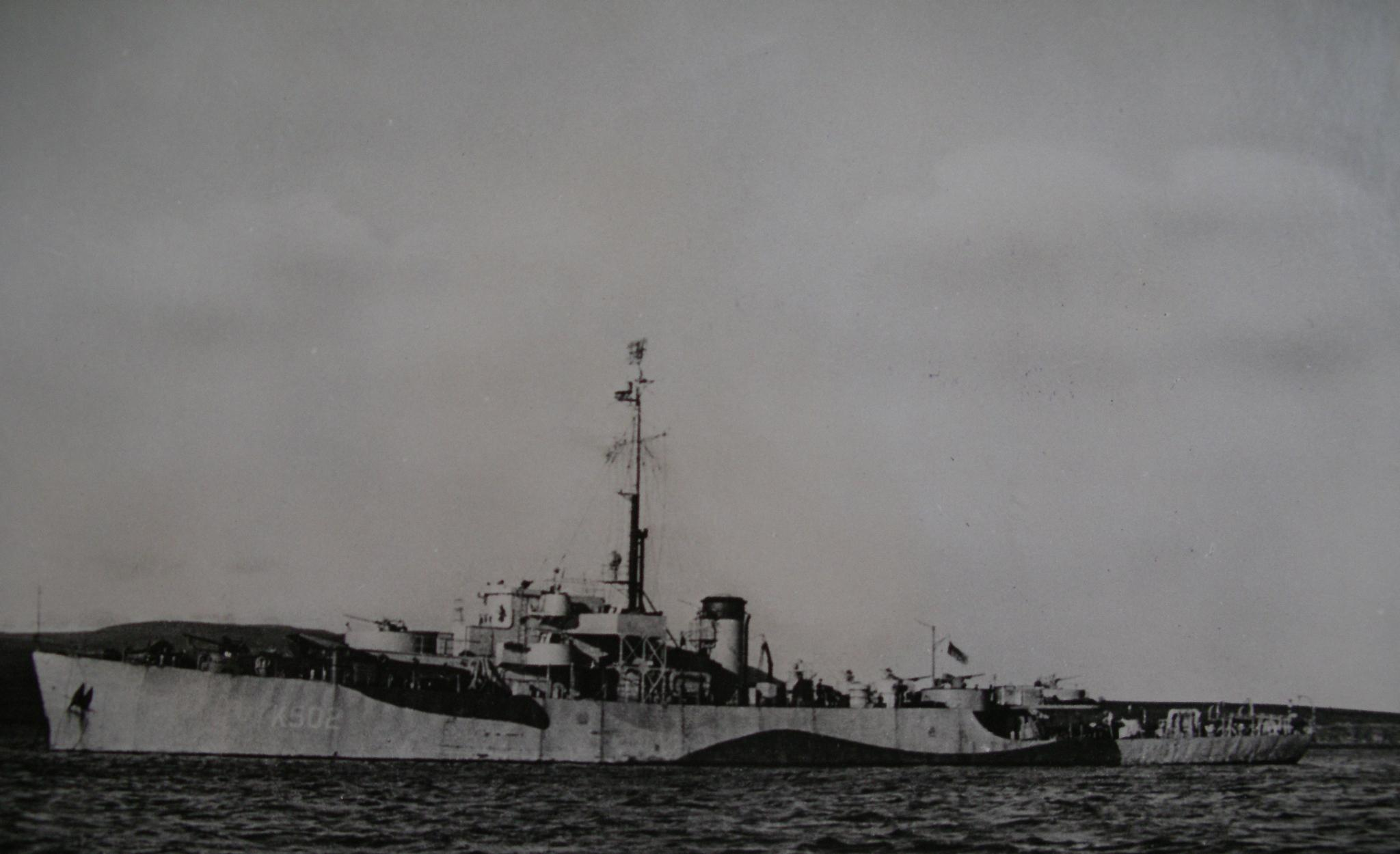
HMS Ascension (K502)

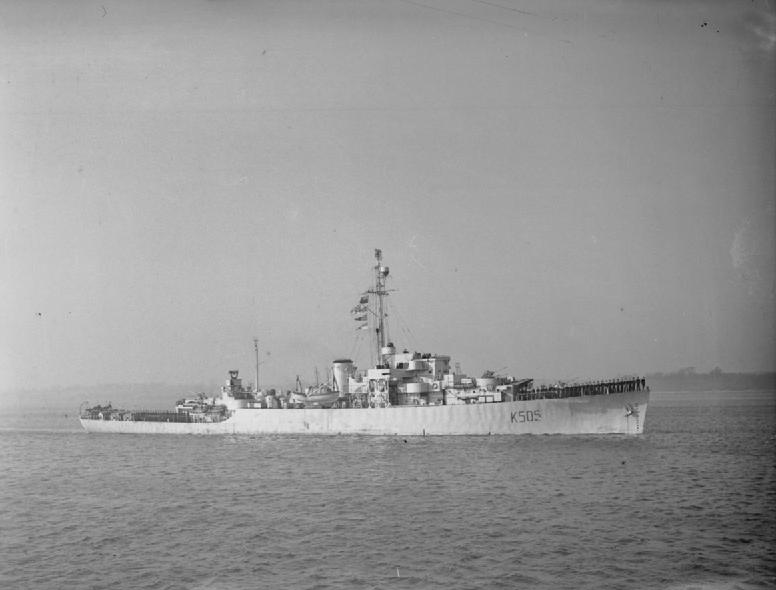
HMS Caicos (K505)

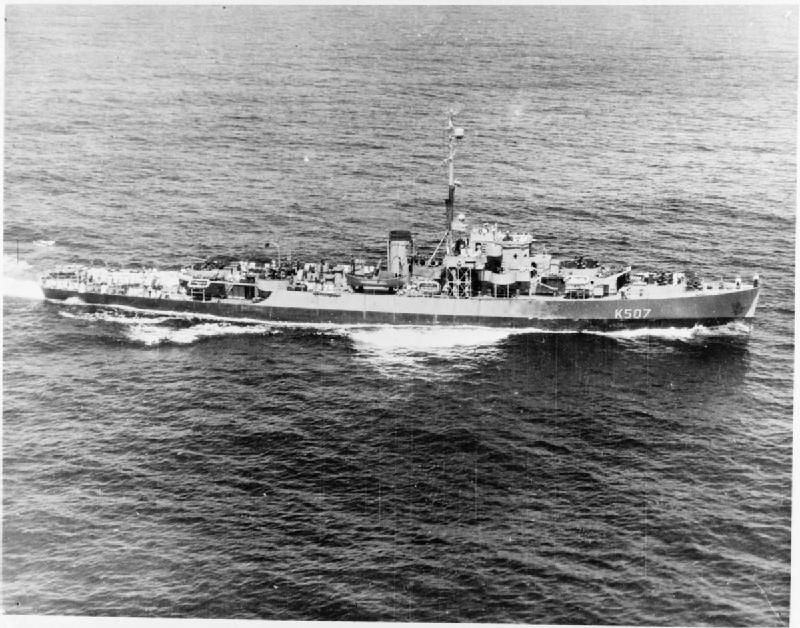
HMS Dominica (K507)

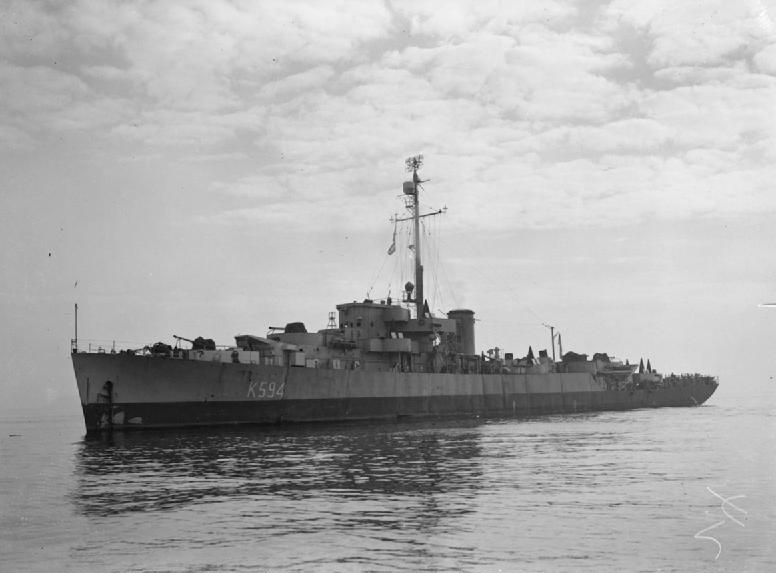
HMS Somaliland (K594)

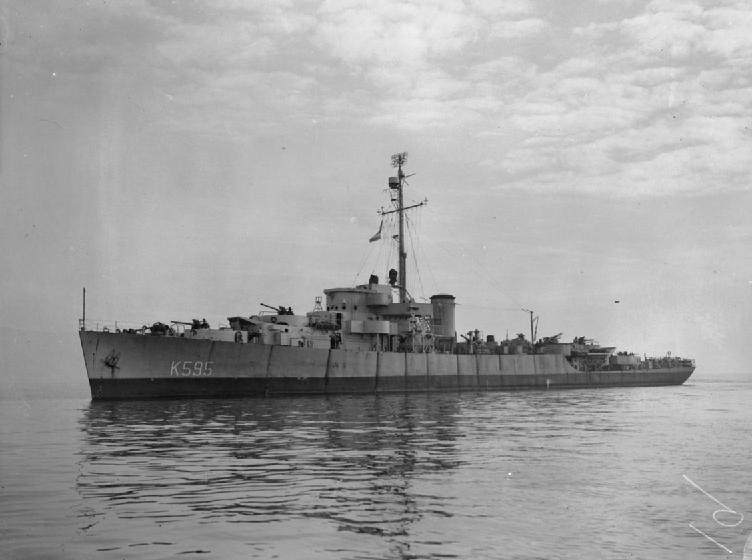
HMS Tortola (K595)

== See also ==
- List of escorteurs of France
- List of patrol vessels of the United States Navy
