= Womens Bay =

Womens Bay or Women's Bay may refer to:

- Womens Bay, Alaska, a census-designated place in Kodiak Island Borough, Alaska, in the United States
- Womens Bay, a bay of the Chiniak Bay of the Gulf of Alaska on the east side of Kodiak Island, Alaska, United States
- Woman's Bay, Barbados, also known as Women's Bay
