= USS Coronado (PF-38) =

Tacoma-class patrol frigate

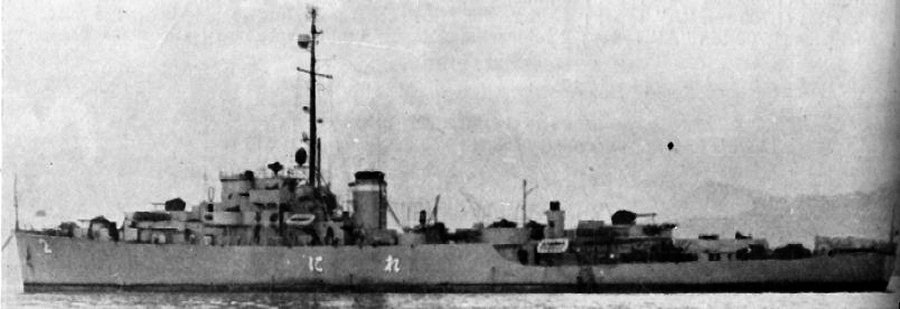
- JDS Sugi, ex-USS Coronado (PF-38), in Japan Maritime Self-Defense Force service, c. 1956.

History

United States
- Name: Coronado
- Namesake: City of Coronado, California
- Reclassified: PF-38, 15 April 1943
- Builder: Consolidated Steel Corporation, Wilmington, California
- Laid down: 6 May 1943
- Launched: 17 June 1943
- Sponsored by: Mrs. J. R. Crutchfield
- Commissioned: 17 November 1943
- Decommissioned: 12 July 1945
- Honors and awards: 4 battle stars, World War II
- Fate: Transferred to Soviet Navy, 12 July 1945
- Acquired: Returned by Soviet Navy, 16 October 1949
- Stricken: 14 January 1953
- Fate: Transferred to Japan Maritime Self-Defense Force, 14 January 1953
- Acquired: Returned by Japan Maritime Self-Defense Force, 9 July 1971
- Fate: Allocated to Japan for use as target ship 1971

History

Soviet Union
- Name: EK-8
- Acquired: 12 July 1945
- Commissioned: 12 July 1945
- Fate: Returned to United States, 16 October 1949

History

Japan
- Name: JDS Sugi (PF-285)
- Acquired: 14 January 1953
- Commissioned: 1953
- Decommissioned: 31 March 1969
- Fate: Returned to United States, 9 July 1971; Allocated to Japan for use as target ship 1971; Sunk as target 10 August 1971

General characteristics
- Class & type: Tacoma-class frigate
- Displacement: 1,430 long tons (1,453 t) light; 2,415 long tons (2,454 t) full
- Length: 303 ft 11 in (92.63 m)
- Beam: 37 ft 6 in (11.43 m)
- Draft: 13 ft 8 in (4.17 m)
- Propulsion: 2 × 5,500 shp (4,100 kW) turbines; 3 boilers; 2 shafts
- Speed: 20 knots (37 km/h; 23 mph)
- Complement: 190
- Armament: 3 × 3"/50 caliber guns (3×1); 3 × 3"/50 dual purpose guns (3x1); 4 x 40 mm guns (2×2); 9 × 20 mm guns (9×1); 1 × Hedgehog anti-submarine mortar; 8 × Y-gun depth charge projectors; 2 × Depth charge tracks

USS Coronado (PG-146/PF-38), a Tacoma-class frigate, was the first ship of the United States Navy named for Coronado, California, a city adjacent to Naval Air Station North Island in San Diego. After World War II service in the U.S. Navy, she served in the Soviet Navy as EK-8 and later in the Japan Maritime Self-Defense Force as Sugi (PF-5) and Sugi (PF-285).

== Construction and commissioning ==
Originally classified as a patrol gunboat, PG-146, Coronado was reclassified as a patrol frigate on 15 April 1943. She was laid down by the Consolidated Steel Corporation of Wilmington, California, under a Maritime Commission contract (MC Type T. S2-S2-AQ1) on 6 May 1943. She was launched on 17 June 1943, sponsored by Mrs. J. R. Crutchfield, and commissioned on 17 November 1943.

== Service history ==
=== U.S. Navy, World War II, 1944–1945 ===
Coronado sailed from San Diego, California, on 8 February 1944, for convoy escort duty to Nouméa, New Caledonia, and Cairns, Australia, en route to New Guinea, arriving there on 25 March. After escorting troop and cargo transports to Manus to support the landings there, she returned to the New Guinea area for the operations in the western part of that island, taking part in the landings on Biak from 28 May to 17 June, at Cape Sansapor from 15 to 18 August, and on Morotai on 15 September.

Coronado sailed from Humboldt Bay on 10 October 1944, to join in the Leyte operation, and served on escort and patrol duty between Leyte and New Guinea until 15 December 1944. She arrived at Boston, Massachusetts, on 24 January 1945 for an overhaul of her main engines and boilers and various modifications, followed by refresher training in Casco Bay, Maine. On 28 March 1945, Escort Division 25, consisting of Coronado and her sister ships USS Long Beach (PF-34) (the flagship), USS Belfast (PF-35), USS Glendale (PF-36), USS San Pedro (PF-37), and USS Ogden (PF-39), departed Casco Bay bound for Seattle, Washington, via the Panama Canal, arriving at Seattle on 26 April 1945. She was moored at the Lake Union Lumber Company Pier there from 30 April to 16 May 1945, undergoing voyage repairs and further alterations by Pacific Electric contractors. In late May and early June 1945, she underwent tests and loaded ammunition.

The six patrol frigates of Escort Division 25 got underway for Kodiak in the Territory of Alaska on 7 June 1945. Ogden had to return to Seattle for repairs, but Coronado and the other four frigates arrived at Womens Bay, Kodiak, on 11 June 1945. On 13 June 1945, 43 of her men transferred ashore for reassignment, and later that day Coronado, Long Beach, Belfast, Glendale, San Pedro, and their sister ships USS Charlottesville (PF-25), USS Allentown (PF-52), USS Machias (PF-53), and USS Sandusky (PF-54) got underway from Kodiak for Cold Bay, Alaska, where they arrived on 14 June 1945 to participate in Project Hula, a secret program for the transfer of U.S. Navy ships to the Soviet Navy in anticipation of the Soviet Union joining the war against Japan.

On 16 June 1945, Coronado's ship's doctor and two of her deck officers transferred ashore for reassignment and, after she passed a material inspection on 17 June, two Soviet Navy officers and 48 Soviet sailors reported aboard for training on 18 June 1945. On 25 June, she received four more Soviet officers – one of them designated to serve as her commanding officer after her transfer to the Soviet Navy – and 45 more Soviet sailors for training, and by 1 July 1945, her entire Soviet crew of 12 officers and 178 enlisted men was aboard. Most of her American crew transferred off the ship at the same time, leaving her with a nucleus American crew of four officers and 44 enlisted men to decommission her.

Training of Coronado's new Soviet Navy crew began on 26 June 1945, and she put to sea with them aboard for the first time on 28 June. Soviet crewmen conducted gunnery practice that day, and the Americans aboard demonstrated fueling, towing at sea, and use of her sonar equipment on 29 June 1945. On 30 June, the Soviet crew took complete control of the operation of the ship. Long days of training continued every day until completed on 8 July 1945. Three days of fueling and provisioning Coronado followed in preparation for her formal transfer to the Soviet Navy.

=== Soviet Navy, 1945–1949 ===
Coronado was decommissioned 12 July 1945, at Cold Bay, and transferred to the Soviet Union under Lend-Lease immediately along with nine of her sister ships, the first group of 10 patrol frigates transferred to the Soviet Navy. Commissioned into the Soviet Navy immediately, she was designated as a storozhevoi korabl ("escort ship") and renamed EK-8 in Soviet service. On 15 July 1945, EK-8 departed Cold Bay in company with her nine sister ships – EK-1 (ex-Charlottesville), EK-2 (ex-Long Beach), EK-3 (ex-Belfast), EK-4 (ex-Machias), EK-5 (ex-San Pedro), EK-6 (ex-Glendale), EK-7 (ex-Sandusky), EK-9 (ex-Allentown), and EK-10 (ex-Ogden) – bound for Petropavlovsk-Kamchatsky in the Soviet Union. EK-8 served as a patrol vessel in the Soviet Far East.

In February 1946, the United States began negotiations with the Soviet Union for the return of ships loaned to the Soviet Navy for use during World War II. On 8 May 1947, United States Secretary of the Navy James V. Forrestal informed the United States Department of State that the United States Department of the Navy wanted 480 of the 585 combatant ships it had transferred to the Soviet Union for World War II use returned, EK-8 among them. Negotiations for the return of the ships was protracted, but the Soviet Union finally returned EK-8 to the United States at Yokosuka, Japan, on 16 October 1949.

=== Japan Maritime Self-Defense Force, 1953–1971 ===
Returning to her original name, Coronado was placed in reserve at Yokosuka until 14 January 1953, when she became one of the first ships the United States loaned to Japan under the Mutual Defense Assistance Program to serve in the Japanese Safety Security Force as Sugi (PF-5) (すぎ (PF-5); "cedar"). She simultaneously was assigned to the 2nd Fleet, which was created that day, along with her sister ship Matsu (ex-USS Charlottesville (PF-25), similarly lent to Japan. Sugi and Matsu were assigned to the Yokosuka District Force. On 1 April 1953, the 2nd Fleet became part of the newly created 1st Fleet Group. The 2nd Fleet later was renamed the 2nd Escort Corps.

In 1954, the Safety Security Force became the Japan Maritime Self-Defense Force (JMSDF). On 10 May 1957, the 2nd Escort Corps was abolished and its ships became part of the new 1st Training Corps, under which Sugi participated in the 1st Training Corps's first two oceanic training voyages.Sugi was redesignated PF-285 on 1 September 1957 and was transferred to the Kure District Force on 10 December 1964.

The JMSDF decommissioned Sugi on 31 March 1969 and returned her to U.S. custody on 9 July 1971. The United States subsequently allocated her to Japan for use as a target ship, and a JMSDF escort ship sank her as a target in the Pacific Ocean south of Nojimazaki on 10 August 1971.

== Awards ==
The U.S. Navy awarded Coronado four battle stars for her World War II service, for the Bismarck Archipelago operation, the Hollandia operation, the Western New Guinea operation, and the Leyte Gulf operation.
