= USS Long Beach (PF-34) =

Tacoma-class patrol frigate

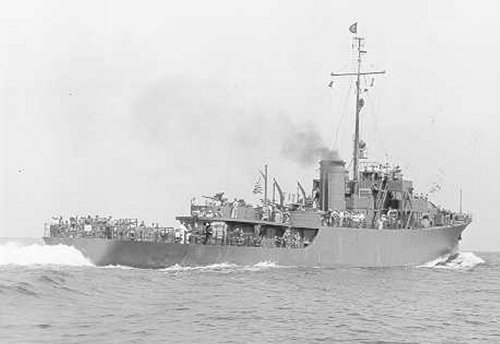
- USS Long Beach (PF-34)

History

United States
- Name: Long Beach
- Namesake: Cities of Long Beach, California, and; Long Beach, New York
- Builder: Globe Shipbuilding Company, Superior, Wisconsin
- Laid down: 19 March 1943
- Reclassified: PF-34, 15 April 1943
- Launched: 5 May 1943
- Sponsored by: Mrs. Walter Boyd
- Commissioned: 8 September 1943
- Decommissioned: 12 July 1945
- Honors and awards: 4 × battle stars, World War II
- Fate: Transferred to the Soviet Navy, 12 July 1945
- Acquired: Returned from Soviet Navy, 1949
- Fate: Transferred to the Japan Maritime Self-Defense Force, 30 November 1953
- Stricken: 1 December 1961

Soviet Union
- Name: EK-2
- Acquired: 12 July 1945
- Commissioned: 12 July 1945
- Honors and awards: Guards rank and ensign
- Fate: Returned to United States, 1949

Japan
- Name: Shii
- Acquired: 30 November 1953
- Decommissioned: 1967
- Fate: Scrapped, 1967

General characteristics
- Class & type: Tacoma-class frigate
- Displacement: 1,430 long tons (1,453 t) light; 2,415 long tons (2,454 t) full
- Length: 303 ft 11 in (92.63 m)
- Beam: 37 ft 6 in (11.43 m)
- Draft: 13 ft 8 in (4.17 m)
- Propulsion: 2 × 5,500 shp (4,101 kW) turbines; 3 boilers; 2 shafts
- Speed: 20 knots (37 km/h; 23 mph)
- Complement: 190
- Armament: 3 × 3"/50 dual purpose guns (3x1); 4 x 40 mm guns (2×2); 9 × 20 mm guns (9×1); 1 × Hedgehog anti-submarine mortar; 8 × Y-gun depth charge projectors; 2 × Depth charge tracks

The second USS Long Beach (PF-34) was a Tacoma-class frigate in commission from 1943 to 1945. She later served in the Soviet Navy as EK-2 and then in the Japan Maritime Self-Defense Force as Shii (PF-17) and Shii (PF-297) and YAS-44.

== Construction and commissioning ==
Long Beach was laid down 19 March 1943, as a patrol gunboat, PG-142, for the Maritime Commission by Consolidated Steel Corporation, in Wilmington, Los Angeles. Reclassified as a patrol frigate, PF-34, on 15 April 1943, she was launched on 5 May 1943, sponsored by Mrs. Walter Boyd; and acquired by the Navy and commissioned on 8 September 1943.

== Service history ==
=== U.S. Navy, World War II, 1943-1945 ===
Following shakedown off California, Long Beach departed San Diego, on 12 January 1944 for Cairns, Australia, arriving there on 17 February 1944. After towing two LCSs from Milne Bay, New Guinea, to Cape Sudest, New Guinea, she departed on 16 March 1944 escorting the dock landing ship USS Carter Hall to the landings on Manus in the Admiralties. Returning to Cape Sudest on 18 March 1944, Long Beach screened ships around New Guinea, and on 19 April 1944 took part in the invasion of Aitape. She sailed for the Schoutens on 6 August 1944 for patrol and shore bombardment duty during cleanup operations against Japanese holdouts in the Biak area, returning to local operations off New Guinea on 31 August 1944.

On 5 November 1944, Long Beach departed for newly invaded Leyte guarding a resupply convoy of tank landing ships (LSTs), arriving at Leyte Gulf on 15 November 1944 and returning to New Guinea on 21 November 1944. She steered for home 15 December 1944, calling at Panama and reaching Boston, on 25 January 1945.

After overhaul, Long Beach, as flagship of Escort Division 25, departed Casco Bay, Maine, with the rest of the division – her sister ships USS Belfast, USS Glendale, USS San Pedro, USS Coronado, and USS Ogden – on 28 March 1945 for Seattle via the Panama Canal, training en route at Balboa in the Panama Canal Zone. The six patrol frigates arrived at Seattle on 26 April 1945, then got underway again for Kodiak, Alaska on 7 June 1945. Ogden had to return to Seattle for repairs, but Long Beach and the other four frigates arrived at Womens Bay, Kodiak, on 11 June 1945.

On 13 June 1945, Long Beach, Belfast, Glendale, San Pedro, Coronado, and their sister ships USS Charlottesville, USS Allentown, USS Machias, and USS Sandusky got underway from Kodiak for Cold Bay, Alaska, where they arrived on 14 June 1945 to participate in Project Hula, a secret program for the transfer of U.S. Navy ships to the Soviet Navy in anticipation of the Soviet Union joining the war against Japan. Training of Long Beach's new Soviet Navy crew soon began at Cold Bay.

=== Soviet Navy, 1945–1949 ===
Long Beach was decommissioned on 12 July 1945 at Cold Bay and transferred to the Soviet Union under Lend-Lease immediately along with nine of her sister ships, the first group of patrol frigates transferred to the Soviet Navy. Commissioned into the Soviet Navy immediately, she was designated as a storozhevoi korabl ("escort ship") and renamed EK-2 in Soviet service. On 15 July 1945, EK-2 departed Cold Bay in company with nine of her sister ships – EK-1 (ex-Charlottesville), EK-3 (ex-Belfast), EK-4 (ex-Machias), EK-5 (ex-San Pedro), EK-6 (ex-Glendale), EK-7 (ex-Sandusky), EK-8 (ex-Coronado), EK-9 (ex-Allentown), and EK-10 (ex-Ogden) – bound for Petropavlovsk-Kamchatsky in the Soviet Union.

EK-2 entered service with the Soviet Pacific Ocean Fleet on 23 July 1945 at Petropavlovsk-Kamchatsky. She participated in the Soviet offensive against Japan in August–September 1945, including the amphibious landings at Chongjin on 18 August 1945 and at Maoka on 20 August 1945. After the Soviet Union concluded military operations against Japan on 5 September 1945, EK-2 served as a patrol vessel in the Soviet Far East.

In February 1946, the United States began negotiations with the Soviet Union for the return of ships loaned to the Soviet Navy for use during World War II. On 8 May 1947, United States Secretary of the Navy James V. Forrestal informed the United States Department of State that the United States Department of the Navy wanted 480 of the 585 combatant ships it had transferred to the Soviet Union for World War II use returned, EK-2 among them. Negotiations for the return of the ships was protracted, but the Soviet Union finally returned EK-2 to the United States at Yokosuka, Japan, in 1949.

=== Japan Maritime Self-Defense Force, 1953–1967 ===
Reverting to her former name, Long Beach lay idle at Yokosuka until the United States loaned her to Japan for service in the Japan Maritime Self-Defense Force (JMSDF) in November 1953 as Shii (PF-17) (しい (PF-17); "castanopsis") . On 15 February 1957, the U.S. Navy cancelled the name Long Beach for her so that the name could be reassigned to a new ship, the nuclear-powered guided-missile cruiser USS Long Beach (CGN-9), which was then under construction. On 1 September 1957, the JSMDF reclassified Shii as PF-297.

Struck from the U.S. Naval Vessel Register on 1 December 1961, Shii was transferred to Japan outright on 28 August 1962 and saw continuous service in the JMSDF until decommissioned and renamed YAS-44 on 3 March 1967.

== Awards ==
- The U.S. Navy awarded Long Beach four battle stars for her World War II service.
- The Soviet Union awarded EK-2 the Guards rank and ensign on 26 August 1945 for her service during World War II Soviet operations against Japan in 1945.
