= USS San Pedro =

Tacoma-class patrol frigate

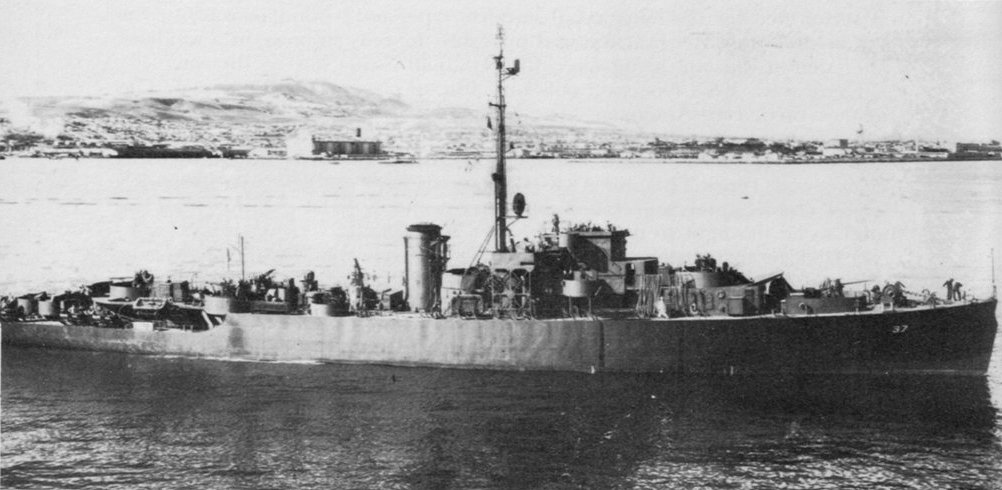
- USS San Pedro (PF-37) in World War II

History

United States
- Name: San Pedro
- Namesake: City of San Pedro, California
- Builder: Consolidated Steel Corporation, Wilmington, California
- Reclassified: PF-37, 15 April 1943
- Laid down: 17 April 1943
- Launched: 11 June 1943
- Sponsored by: Miss Virginia Ann Massee
- Commissioned: 23 October 1943
- Decommissioned: 12 July 1945
- Honors and awards: 4 × battle stars, World War II
- Fate: Transferred to the Soviet Navy, 12 July 1945
- Acquired: Returned by Soviet Navy, 17 October 1949
- Fate: Transferred to the Japan Maritime Self-Defense Force, 2 April 1953
- Acquired: Returned by Japan Maritime Self-Defense Force, 26 July 1978
- Fate: Sunk as target
- Stricken: 1 December 1961

Soviet Union
- Name: EK-5
- Acquired: 12 July 1945
- Commissioned: 12 July 1945
- Fate: Returned to US, 17 October 1949

Japan
- Name: Kaya
- Acquired: 2 April 1953
- Renamed: YAC-23, 1966
- Decommissioned: 1 April 1977
- Fate: Returned to United States, 26 July 1978

General characteristics
- Class & type: Tacoma-class frigate
- Displacement: 1,264 long tons (1,284 t)
- Length: 303 ft 11 in (92.63 m)
- Beam: 37 ft 6 in (11.43 m)
- Draft: 13 ft 8 in (4.17 m)
- Propulsion: 2 × 5,500 shp (4,101 kW) turbines; 3 boilers; 2 shafts
- Speed: 20 knots (37 km/h)
- Complement: 190
- Armament: 3 × 3"/50 dual purpose guns (3x1); 4 x 40 mm guns (2×2); 9 × 20 mm guns (9×1); 1 × Hedgehog anti-submarine mortar; 8 × Y-gun depth charge projectors; 2 × Depth charge tracks

USS San Pedro (PF-37), a Tacoma-class frigate in commission from 1943 to 1945, thus far has been the only ship of the United States Navy to be named for San Pedro, California. She later served in the Soviet Navy as EK-5 and in the Japan Maritime Self-Defense Force as Kaya (PF-8), Kaya (PF-288) and as YAC-23.

== Construction and commissioning ==
Originally classified as a patrol gunboat, PG-145, San Pedro was reclassified as a patrol frigate, PF-37, on 15 April 1943. She was laid down under Maritime Commission contract (MC hull 1448) at the Consolidated Steel Corporation in Wilmington, California, on 17 April 1943, launched on 11 June 1943, sponsored by Miss Virginia Ann Massee, and commissioned on 23 October 1943.

== Service history ==
=== U.S. Navy, World War II, 1943–1945 ===
Following shakedown, San Pedro departed for the Southwest Pacific. She performed escort duty briefly in the Admiralty Islands at the beginning of April 1944, and at the end of the month became part of forces attempting to consolidate the western New Guinea area. Her first mission took her to Hollandia, and she subsequently advanced to Biak in June 1944, Noemfoor Island in July 1944, and Cape Sansapor in August 1944. During September 1944, she escorted a convoy of tugs and barges to Morotai with sufficient equipment to set up a fully equipped base for PT boats.

On 18 October 1944, San Pedro departed with a convoy bound for the initial assault on Leyte in the Philippine Islands. She helped repulse Japanese air attacks beginning on 24 October 1944, shooting down two aircraft before the end of the month. While operations continued ashore, San Pedro escorted resupply convoys between Hollandia and Leyte. On 5 December 1944, a single Japanese plane attacked one of these convoys near Leyte, torpedoed the Liberty ship SS Antoine Saugrain, and escaped by flying through the convoy at masthead height. It then led a companion in for a re-attack and scored a second and fatal hit on the hapless merchant ship. San Pedro rescued 178 survivors and, at the same time, helped repulse a third attack on the sinking ship.

San Pedro departed the Southwest Pacific on 17 December 1944 and headed toward Boston, Massachusetts, for overhaul.

Upon completion of repairs, San Pedro got underway from Casco Bay, Maine, on 28 March 1945 as part of Escort Division 25 – which also included her sister ships USS Long Beach (PF-34) (the flagship), USS Belfast (PF-35), USS Glendale (PF-36), USS Coronado (PF-38), and USS Ogden (PF-39) – bound for Seattle, Washington, via the Panama Canal. The six patrol frigates arrived at Seattle on 26 April 1945. They got underway again for Kodiak in the Territory of Alaska on 7 June 1945. Ogden had to return to Seattle for repairs, but Belfast and the other four frigates arrived at Womens Bay, Kodiak, on 11 June 1945.

On 13 June 1945, San Pedro, Long Beach, Belfast, Glendale, Coronado, and their sister ships USS Charlottesville (PF-25), USS Allentown (PF-52), USS Machias (PF-53), and USS Sandusky (PF-54) got underway from Kodiak for Cold Bay, Alaska, where they arrived on 14 June 1945 to participate in Project Hula, a secret program for the transfer of U.S. Navy ships to the Soviet Navy in anticipation of the Soviet Union joining the war against Japan. Training of San Pedro's new Soviet Navy crew soon began at Cold Bay.

=== Soviet Navy, 1945–1949 ===
San Pedro was decommissioned on 12 July 1945 at Cold Bay and transferred to the Soviet Union under Lend-Lease immediately along with nine of her sister ships, the first group of patrol frigates transferred to the Soviet Navy. Commissioned into the Soviet Navy immediately, San Pedro was designated as a storozhevoi korabl ("escort ship") and renamed EK-5 in Soviet service. On 15 July 1945, EK-5 departed Cold Bay in company with nine of her sister ships – EK-1 (ex-Charlottesville), EK-2 (ex-Long Beach), EK-3 (ex-Belfast), EK-4 (ex-Machias), EK-6 (ex-Glendale), EK-7 (ex-Sandusky), EK-8 (ex-Coronado), EK-9 (ex-Allentown), and EK-10 (ex-Ogden) – bound for Petropavlovsk-Kamchatsky in the Soviet Union. EK-5 served as a patrol vessel in the Soviet Far East.

In February 1946, the United States began negotiations for the return of ships loaned to the Soviet Union for use during World War II. On 8 May 1947, United States Secretary of the Navy James V. Forrestal informed the United States Department of State that the United States Department of the Navy wanted 480 of the 585 combatant ships it had transferred to the Soviet Union for World War II use returned, EK-5 among them. Negotiations for the return of the ships was protracted, but on 17 October 1949 the Soviet Union finally returned EK-5 to the U.S. Navy at Yokosuka, Japan.

=== Japan Maritime Self-Defense Force, 1953–1978 ===
Reverting to her former name, San Pedro lay idle until the United States loaned her to Japan on 2 April 1953, and she entered service in the Japan Maritime Self-Defense Force as Kaya (PF-8) (かや (PF-8); "torreya nucifera"). Kaya was redesignated PF-288 on 1 September 1957. The U.S. Navy struck her from the Navy list on 1 December 1961 and transferred her outright to Japan on 28 August 1962. Later reclassified as an "auxiliary stock craft" and renamed YAC-23, the ship was decommissioned on 1 April 1977, and returned to United States custody on 26 July 1978. She was sunk as a target ship.

== Awards ==
The U.S. Navy awarded San Pedro four battle stars for her World War II service.
