= USS Belfast =

Tacoma-class patrol frigate

History

United States
- Name: Belfast
- Namesake: City of Belfast, Maine
- Builder: Consolidated Steel Corporation, Wilmington, California
- Laid down: 26 March 1943
- Reclassified: PF-35, 15 April 1943
- Launched: 20 May 1943
- Sponsored by: Miss Elizabeth C. Wilson
- Commissioned: 24 November 1943
- Decommissioned: 12 July 1945
- Honors and awards: 2 battle stars, World War II
- Fate: Transferred to the Soviet Navy, 12 July 1945
- Stricken: 31 January 1950

Soviet Union
- Name: EK-3
- Acquired: 12 July 1945
- Commissioned: 12 July 1945
- Fate: Wrecked, 17 November 1948; Scrapped 1960

General characteristics
- Class & type: Tacoma-class frigate
- Displacement: 1,430 long tons (1,453 t) light; 2,415 long tons (2,454 t) full
- Length: 303 ft 11 in (92.63 m)
- Beam: 37 ft 6 in (11.43 m)
- Draft: 13 ft 8 in (4.17 m)
- Propulsion: 2 × 5,500 shp (4,101 kW) turbines; 3 boilers; 2 shafts
- Speed: 20 knots (37 km/h; 23 mph)
- Complement: 190
- Armament: 3 × 3"/50 dual purpose guns (3x1); 4 x 40 mm guns (2×2); 9 × 20 mm guns (9×1); 1 × Hedgehog anti-submarine mortar; 8 × Y-gun depth charge projectors; 2 × Depth charge tracks

USS Belfast (PF-35), the only ship of the name, was a United States Navy Tacoma-class frigate in commission from 1943 to 1945. She then served in the Soviet Navy as EK-3.

== Construction and commissioning ==
Belfast (PF-35) was laid down on 26 March 1943, at Wilmington, California, by the Consolidated Steel Corporation under a Maritime Commission contract (MC hull 1446). She was launched on 20 May 1943, sponsored by Miss Elizabeth C. Wilson, and commissioned at Terminal Island, California, on 24 November 1943.

== Service history ==
=== US Navy, World War II, 1943–1945 ===
Following outfitting, shakedown, and post-shakedown repairs, Belfast stood out of San Pedro, California, on 30 April 1944 and headed for Australia. After stopping at Nouméa, New Caledonia, Belfast reached Cairns, Australia, at the end of May 1944. From there, she moved into the Southwest Pacific theater of operations to serve as a patrol vessel and convoy escort. During the summer and early autumn of 1944, she supported the latter stages of the leapfrog assaults along the northern coast of New Guinea. She took part in the Noemfoor landing on 2 July 1944 and in the assault on Cape Opmarai on 30 July 1944.

Belfast continued to operate in the waters around western New Guinea until sent to escort a reinforcement convoy to Leyte in the Philippine Islands during October 1944. She then operated around Leyte from the end of October until the second week in December 1944. Near the end of 1944, she headed back to the United States and arrived at Boston, Massachusetts, on 24 January 1945 for extensive repairs lasting until spring.

As part of Escort Division 25, Belfast departed Casco Bay, Maine, with the rest of the division – her sister ships USS Long Beach (PF-34) (the flagship), USS Glendale (PF-36), USS San Pedro (PF-37), USS Coronado (PF-38), and USS Ogden (PF-39) – on 28 March 1945 for Seattle, Washington, via the Panama Canal. The six patrol frigates arrived at Seattle on 26 April 1945, and Belfast also called at Port Townsend, Washington, at some point. All six patrol frigates got underway for Kodiak in the Territory of Alaska on 7 June 1945. Ogden had to return to Seattle for repairs, but Belfast and the other four frigates arrived at Womens Bay, Kodiak, on 11 June 1945.

On 13 June 1945, Belfast, Long Beach, Glendale, San Pedro, Coronado, and their sister ships USS Charlottesville (PF-25), USS Allentown (PF-52), USS Machias (PF-53), and USS Sandusky (PF-54) got underway from Kodiak for Cold Bay, Alaska, where they arrived on 14 June 1945 to participate in Project Hula, a secret program for the transfer of U.S. Navy ships to the Soviet Navy in anticipation of the Soviet Union joining the war against Japan. Training of Belfast's new Soviet Navy crew soon began at Cold Bay.

=== Soviet Navy, 1945–1948 ===
Belfast was decommissioned on 12 July 1945 at Cold Bay and transferred to the Soviet Union under Lend-Lease immediately along with nine of her sister ships, the first group of patrol frigates transferred to the Soviet Navy. Commissioned into the Soviet Navy immediately, she was designated as a storozhevoi korabl ("escort ship") and renamed EK-3 in Soviet service. On 15 July 1945, EK-3 departed Cold Bay in company with nine of her sister ships – EK-1 (ex-Charlottesville), EK-2 (ex-Long Beach), EK-4 (ex-Machias), EK-5 (ex-San Pedro), EK-6 (ex-Glendale), EK-7 (ex-Sandusky), EK-8 (ex-Coronado), EK-9 (ex-Allentown), and EK-10 (ex-Ogden) – bound for Petropavlovsk-Kamchatsky in the Soviet Union. EK-3 served as a patrol vessel in the Soviet Far East.

In February 1946, the United States began negotiations with the Soviet Union for the return of ships loaned to the Soviet Navy for use during World War II. On 8 May 1947, United States Secretary of the Navy James V. Forrestal informed the United States Department of State that the United States Department of the Navy wanted 480 of the 585 combatant ships it had transferred to the Soviet Union for World War II use returned, EK-3 among them. Negotiations for the return of the ships was protracted, but in October and November 1949 the Soviet Union finally returned 27 of the 28 patrol frigates transferred in Project Hula. The only exception was EK-3, which had run aground during a storm on 17 November 1948 off Petropavlovsk-Kamchatsky and been damaged beyond economical repair. The U.S. Navy declared her a total loss on 14 November 1949, and her name was struck from the Navy list on 31 January 1950. The only Project Hula frigate not returned to the United States, she was scrapped in the Soviet Union in 1960.

== Awards ==
- Asiatic-Pacific Campaign Medal with two battle stars for World War II service
- World War II Victory Medal
