= USS Glendale =

Tacoma-class patrol frigate

Coordinates: 14.300972°N 101.132553°E

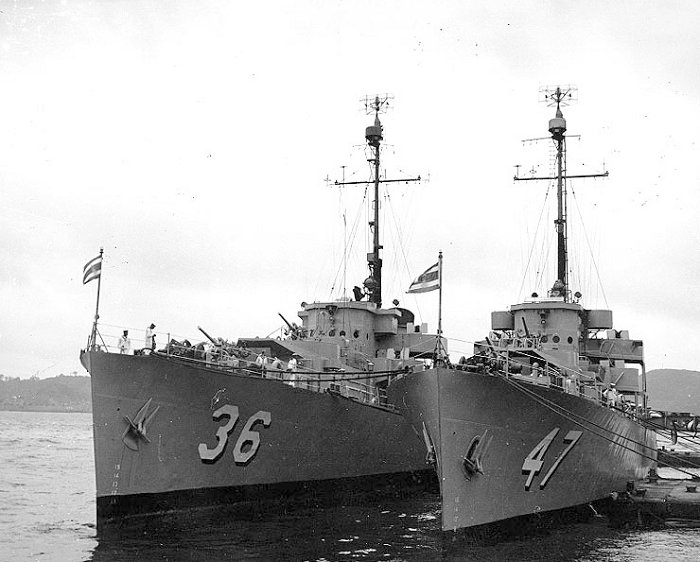
- USS Glendale (PF-36), left, with her sister ship USS Gallup (PF-47) on 29 October 1951, during the ceremony for their transfer to the Royal Thai Navy.

History

United States
- Name: Glendale
- Namesake: City of Glendale, California
- Builder: Consolidated Steel Corporation, Wilmington, California
- Laid down: 6 April 1943
- Identification: PG-144; PF-36 (15 April 1943)
- Launched: 28 May 1943
- Sponsored by: Miss Shirley Schlichtman
- Commissioned: 1 October 1943
- Decommissioned: 12 July 1945
- Honors and awards: 5 × battle stars, World War II
- Fate: Transferred to the Soviet Union, 12 July 1945
- Acquired: Returned by Soviet Union, 16 November 1949
- Recommissioned: 11 October 1950
- Decommissioned: 29 October 1951
- Honors and awards: 4 × battle stars, Korean War; Korean Presidential Unit Citation
- Fate: Transferred to the Royal Thai Navy, 29 October 1951
- Stricken: 20 November 1951

Soviet Union
- Name: EK-6
- Acquired: 12 July 1945
- Commissioned: 12 July 1945
- Fate: Returned to United States, 16 November 1949

Thailand
- Name: Tachin
- Namesake: Tha Chin River
- Acquired: 29 October 1951
- Decommissioned: 22 June 2000
- Identification: PF-1; later reclassified PF-411
- Fate: Preserved
- Status: On display as a memorial at the Armed Forces Academies Preparatory School, Nakhon Nayok, Thailand, since 9 July 2001

General characteristics
- Class & type: Tacoma-class frigate
- Displacement: 1,430 long tons (1,453 t) light; 2,415 long tons (2,454 t) full
- Length: 303 ft 11 in (92.63 m)
- Beam: 37 ft 6 in (11.43 m)
- Draft: 13 ft 8 in (4.17 m)
- Propulsion: 2 × 5,500 shp (4,101 kW) turbines; 3 boilers; 2 shafts
- Speed: 20 knots (37 km/h; 23 mph)
- Complement: 190
- Armament: 3 × 3"/50 dual purpose guns (3x1); 4 x 40 mm guns (2×2); 9 × 20 mm guns (9×1); 1 × Hedgehog anti-submarine mortar; 8 × Y-gun depth charge projectors; 2 × Depth charge tracks

USS Glendale (PF-36), a Tacoma-class patrol frigate, is the only ship of the United States Navy to be named for Glendale, California. In commission in the US Navy from 1943 to 1945, and from 1950 to 1951, she also served in the Soviet Navy as EK-6 from 1945 to 1949 and in the Royal Thai Navy as Tachin (PF-1) from 1951 to 2000.

== Construction and commissioning ==
Originally classified as a patrol gunboat, PG-144, Glendale was reclassified as a patrol frigate, PF-36, on 15 April 1943. She was launched on 28 May 1943, at the Consolidated Steel Corporation shipyard in Los Angeles, California, sponsored by Miss Shirley Schlichtman and commissioned on 1 October 1943.

== Service history ==
=== World War II, 1944-1945 ===
Following shakedown off Southern California, Glendale departed San Diego, California, on 12 January 1944 and reached Cairns, Australia, on 17 February 1944. Until late 1944, she served as an anti-submarine and anti-aircraft escort ship based in New Guinea, protecting arriving and departing merchant ships.

In September 1944, Glendale took part in the assault on Morotai Island, departing Humboldt Bay, New Guinea, on 14 September 1944 to escort merchant ships to the island. She returned to Humboldt Bay on 24 September 1944 to continue escort assignments between New Guinea and the Philippine Islands.

On 5 December 1944, Glendale was escorting a convoy from Hollandia to Leyte in the Philippines when attacking Japanese aircraft sank SS Antoine Saugrain, a cargo ship laden with valuable radar materiel, and severely damaged the merchant ship SS Marcus Daly. Glendale escorted the rest of the convoy safely into Leyte the next day.

Glendale departed Leyte on 8 December 1944 bound for the Atlantic Ocean and moored at Boston, Massachusetts, on 24 January 1945.

After overhaul, Glendale got underway from Casco Bay, Maine, on 28 March 1945 as part of Escort Division 25 – which also included her sister ships Long Beach (the flagship), Belfast, San Pedro, Coronado, and Ogden – bound for Seattle, Washington, via the Panama Canal. The six patrol frigates arrived at Seattle on 26 April 1945. They got underway again for Kodiak in the Territory of Alaska on 7 June 1945. Ogden had to return to Seattle for repairs, but Belfast and the other four frigates arrived at Womens Bay, Kodiak, on 11 June 1945.

On 13 June 1945, Glendale, Long Beach, Belfast, San Pedro, Coronado, and their sister ships Charlottesville, Allentown, Machias, and Sandusky got underway from Kodiak for Cold Bay, Alaska, where they arrived on 14 June 1945 to participate in Project Hula, a secret program for the transfer of U.S. Navy ships to the Soviet Navy in anticipation of the Soviet Union joining the war against Japan. Training of Glendale's new Soviet Navy crew soon began at Cold Bay.

=== Soviet Navy, 1945–1949 ===
Glendale was decommissioned on 12 July 1945 at Cold Bay and transferred to the Soviet Union under Lend-Lease immediately along with nine of her sister ships. This was the first group of patrol frigates transferred to the Soviet Navy. When her commanding officer, Lieutenant Commander Ambrose Simko, handed Glendale over to the Soviet Navy, he as well as the commanding officers of the other nine transferred patrol frigates received custom daggers made for each of them as gifts from the Soviets. Commissioned into the Soviet Navy immediately, Glendale was designated as a storozhevoi korabl ("escort ship") and renamed EK-6 in Soviet service. On 15 July 1945, EK-6 departed Cold Bay in company with nine of her sister ships – EK-1 (ex-Charlottesville), EK-2 (ex-Long Beach), EK-3 (ex-Belfast), EK-4 (ex-Machias), EK-5 (ex-San Pedro), EK-7 (ex-Sandusky), EK-8 (ex-Coronado), EK-9 (ex-Allentown), and EK-10 (ex-Ogden) – bound for Petropavlovsk-Kamchatsky in the Soviet Union. EK-6 served as a patrol vessel in the Soviet Far East.

In February 1946, the United States began negotiations with the Soviet Union for the return of ships loaned to the Soviet Navy for use during World War II. On 8 May 1947, United States Secretary of the Navy James V. Forrestal informed the United States Department of State that the United States Department of the Navy wanted 480 of the 585 combatant ships it had transferred to the Soviet Union for World War II use returned, EK-6 among them. Negotiations for the return of the ships was protracted, but on 16 November 1949 the Soviet Union finally returned EK-6 to the U.S. Navy at Yokosuka, Japan.

=== Korean War, 1950–1951 ===
Reverting to her old name. Glendale was recommissioned into the U.S. Navy on 11 October 1950 for service in the Korean War. In December 1950, the ship patrolled off Hungnam, Pusan, and Inchon, Korea, in support of United Nations forces fighting ashore. On 29 October 1951, she was decommissioned again and transferred along with her sister ship USS Gallup (PF-47) to the Government of Thailand. The U.S. Navy struck Glendale from the Navy List on 20 November 1951.

=== Royal Thai Navy, 1951-2000 ===
The ship served in the Royal Thai Navy as HTMS Tachin (PF-1), later reclassified PF-411. She was decommissioned on 22 June 2000 at Sattahip Naval Base.

== Museum ship ==
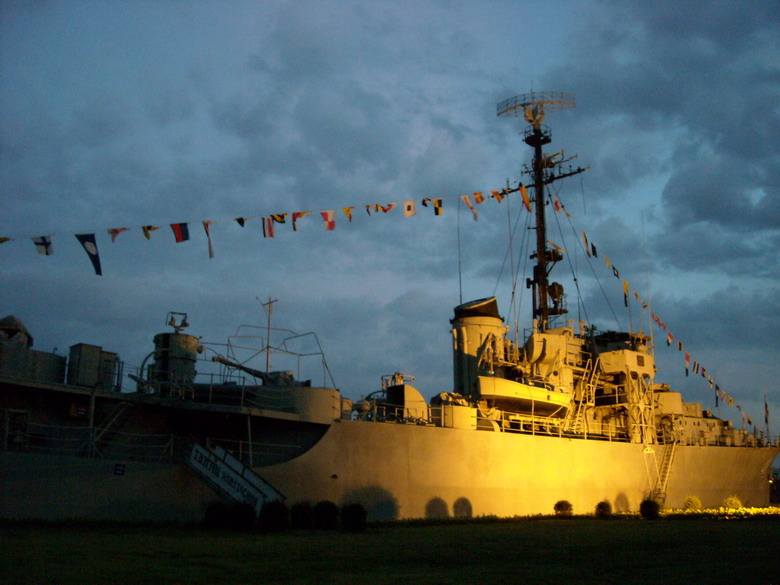
Tachin preserved at the Armed Forces Academies Preparatory School.

Dismantled and transported by truck to the Armed Forces Academies Preparatory School in Nakhon Nayok Province, Thailand, Tachin was re-assembled and has been on display there since 9 July 2001 with all her original armament intact.

== Awards ==
The U.S. Navy awarded Glendale five battle stars for her World War II service and four battle stars for her Korean War service. She also received the Korean Presidential Unit Citation for her actions during the Korean War.
