= USS Charlottesville =

Tacoma-class patrol frigate

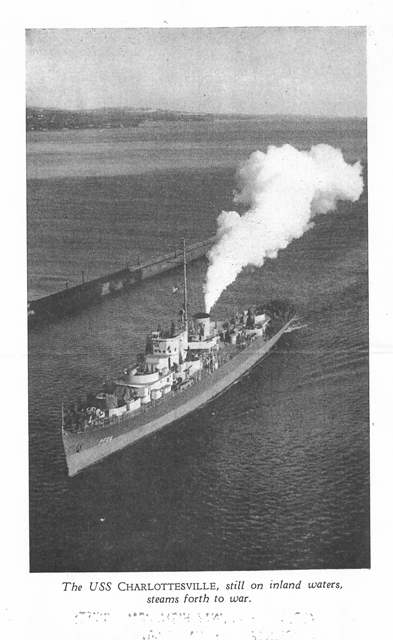
- USS Charlottesville in 1948

History

United States
- Name: Charlottesville
- Namesake: City of Charlottesville, Virginia
- Reclassified: PF-25, 15 April 1943
- Builder: Walter Butler Shipbuilding Company, Superior, Wisconsin
- Laid down: 12 May 1943
- Launched: 30 July 1943
- Sponsored by: Mrs. J. E. Gleason
- Commissioned: 10 April 1944
- Decommissioned: 12 July 1945
- Honors and awards: 2 battle stars, World War II
- Fate: Transferred to the Soviet Navy, 12 July 1945
- Acquired: Returned by Soviet Navy, 17 October 1949
- Fate: Transferred to Japan Maritime Self-Defense Force, 14 January 1953

Soviet Union
- Name: EK-1
- Acquired: 12 July 1945
- Commissioned: 12 July 1945
- Fate: Returned to United States, 17 October 1949

Japan
- Name: Matsu
- Acquired: 14 January 1953
- Renamed: YAS-36, 31 March 1966
- Reclassified: Auxiliary service vessel (YAS) 31 March 1966
- Decommissioned: 31 March 1969
- Fate: Returned to United States, 12 July 1972; Final disposition unknown

General characteristics
- Class & type: Tacoma-class frigate
- Displacement: 1,430 long tons (1,453 t) light; 2,415 long tons (2,454 t) full
- Length: 303 ft 11 in (92.63 m)
- Beam: 37 ft 11 in (11.56 m)
- Draft: 13 ft 8 in (4.17 m)
- Propulsion: 2 × 5,500 shp (4,101 kW) turbines; 3 boilers; 2 shafts
- Speed: 20 knots (37 km/h; 23 mph)
- Complement: 190
- Armament: 3 × 3"/50 dual purpose guns (3x1); 4 x 40 mm guns (2×2); 9 × 20 mm guns (9×1); 1 × Hedgehog anti-submarine mortar; 8 × Y-gun depth charge projectors; 2 × Depth charge tracks

USS Charlottesville (PF-25), a United States Navy Tacoma-class frigate in commission from 1944 to 1945, has been the only US Navy ship thus far to be named for Charlottesville, Virginia. She later served in the Soviet Navy as EK-1 and in the Japan Maritime Self-Defense Force as JDS Matsu (PF-6), JDS Matsu (PF-286) and YAS-36.

== Construction and commissioning ==
Originally classified as a patrol gunboat, PG-133, Charlottesville was reclassified as a patrol frigate, PF-25, on 15 April 1943. She was launched on 30 July 1943, by the Walter Butler Shipbuilding Company in Superior, Wisconsin, under a Maritime Commission contract, sponsored by Mrs. J. E. Gleason, wife of the mayor of Charlottesville, Virginia. The ship was commissioned on 10 April 1944.

== Service history ==
=== U.S. Navy, World War II, 1944–1945 ===
Departing New York City on 18 August 1944, Charlottesville arrived at Finschhafen, New Guinea, on 29 September 1944 by way of Bora Bora in the Society Islands. She operated on convoy escort and anti-submarine patrol duty between New Guinea and the Philippine Islands until 6 March 1945, when she departed Leyte in the Philippines for Seattle, Washington.

Earmarked for transfer to the Soviet Navy in Project Hula, a secret program for the transfer of U.S. Navy ships to the Soviet Navy in anticipation of the Soviet Union joining the war against Japan, Charlottesville steamed to Kodiak in the Territory of Alaska after the completion of overhaul and modifications at Seattle. On 13 June 1945, Charlottesville joined her sister ships USS Long Beach (PF-34), USS Belfast (PF-35), USS Glendale (PF-36), USS San Pedro (PF-37), USS Coronado (PF-38), USS Allentown (PF-52), USS Machias (PF-53), and USS Sandusky (PF-54) in getting underway from Kodiak for Cold Bay, Alaska, where they arrived on 14 June 1945 to enter Project Hula. Training of Charlottesville's new Soviet Navy crew soon began at Cold Bay.

=== Soviet Navy, 1945–1949 ===
Charlottesville was decommissioned on 12 July 1945 at Cold Bay and transferred to the Soviet Union under Lend-Lease immediately along with nine of her sister ships, the first group of patrol frigates transferred to the Soviet Navy. Commissioned into the Soviet Navy immediately, Charlottesville was designated as a storozhevoi korabl ("escort ship") and renamed EK-1 in Soviet service. On 15 July 1945, EK-1 departed Cold Bay in company with nine of her sister ships – EK-2 (ex-Long Beach), EK-3 (ex-Belfast), EK-4 (ex-Machias), EK-5 (ex-San Pedro), EK-6 (ex-Glendale), EK-7 (ex-Sandusky), EK-8 (ex-Coronado), EK-9 (ex-Allentown), and EK-10 (ex-USS Ogden (PF-39)) – bound for Petropavlovsk-Kamchatsky in the Soviet Union. EK-1 served as a patrol vessel in the Soviet Far East.

In February 1946, the United States began negotiations for the return of ships loaned to the Soviet Union for use during World War II. On 8 May 1947, United States Secretary of the Navy James V. Forrestal informed the United States Department of State that the United States Department of the Navy wanted 480 of the 585 combatant ships it had transferred to the Soviet Union for World War II use returned, EK-1 among them. Negotiations for the return of the ships was protracted, but on 17 October 1949 the Soviet Union finally returned EK-1 to the U.S. Navy at Yokosuka, Japan.

=== Japan Maritime Self-Defense Force, 1953–1972 ===
Reverting to her former name, Charlottesville was laid up in the Pacific Reserve Fleet at Yokosuka, and remained idle until the United States loaned her to Japan on 14 January 1953 for service in the Japan Maritime Self-Defense Force, which renamed her JDS Matsu (PF-6) (まつ (PF-6); "pine tree"). Matsu was redesignated PF-286 on 1 September 1957. She was reclassified as an "auxiliary service vessel" and renamed YAS-36 on 31 March 1966. Decommissioned on 31 March 1969, she was returned to U.S. custody on 12 July 1972. Her fate thereafter is unknown.

== Awards ==
The US Navy awarded Charlottesville two battle stars for service in World War II.
