= Thomas R. Sargent III =

Vice Commandant of the United States Coast Guard

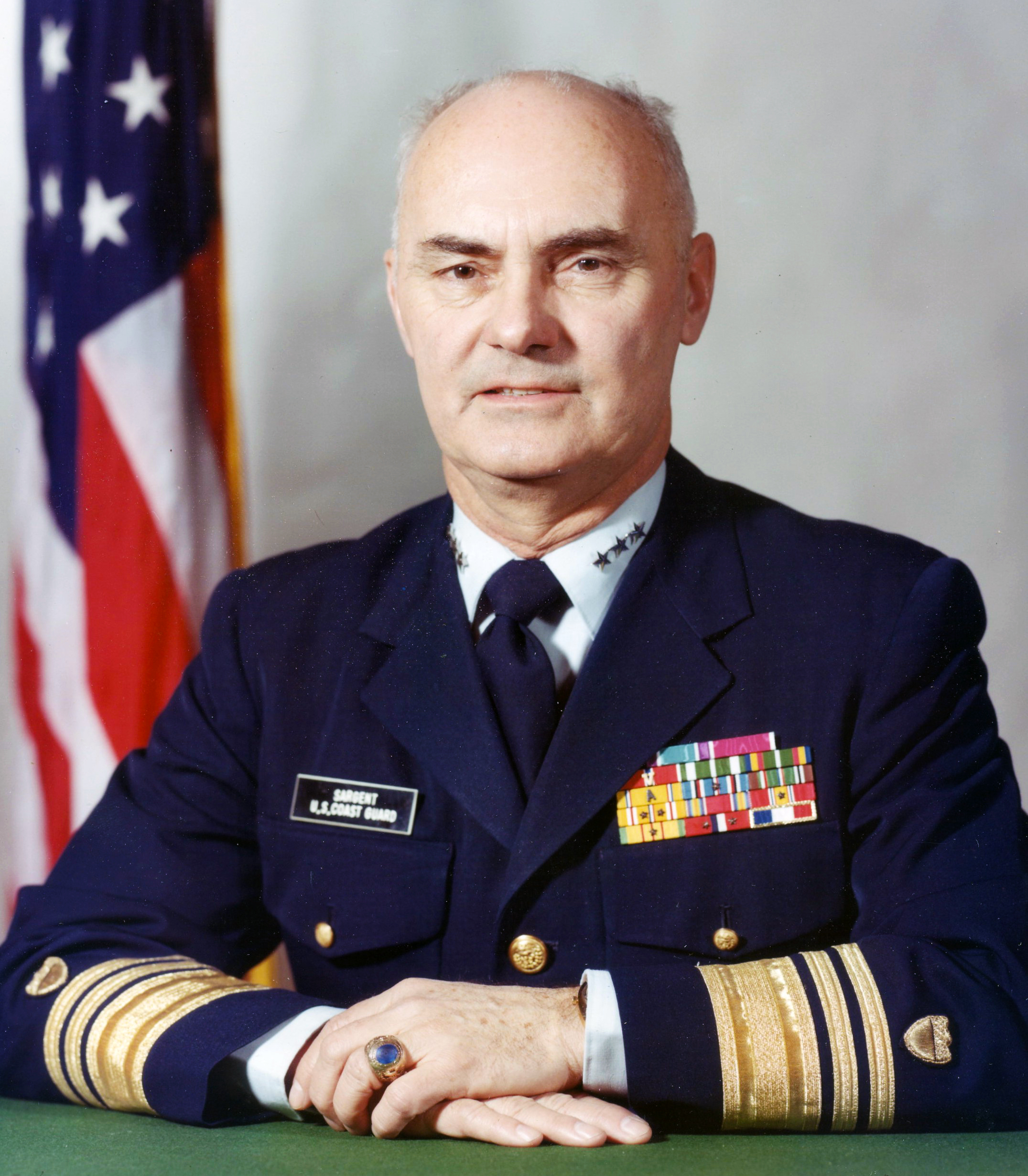
- Born: December 20, 1914; London, England
- Died: May 29, 2010 (aged 95); Lake San Marcos, California, United States
- Burial place: Arlington National Cemetery
- Military career
- Allegiance: United States
- Branch: United States Coast Guard
- Service years: 1938–1974
- Rank: Vice admiral
- Commands: Vice Commandant of the United States Coast Guard

Thomas Reece Sargent III (December 20, 1914 – May 29, 2010) was a vice admiral and Vice Commandant of the United States Coast Guard.

== Biography ==
Sargent was born on December 20, 1914, in London, England. He became a naturalized citizen of the United States in 1930. In 1933, he graduated from high school in New London, Connecticut. Later, Sargent graduated from Rensselaer Polytechnic Institute.

Sargent died on May 29, 2010. He is buried at Arlington National Cemetery.

== Career ==
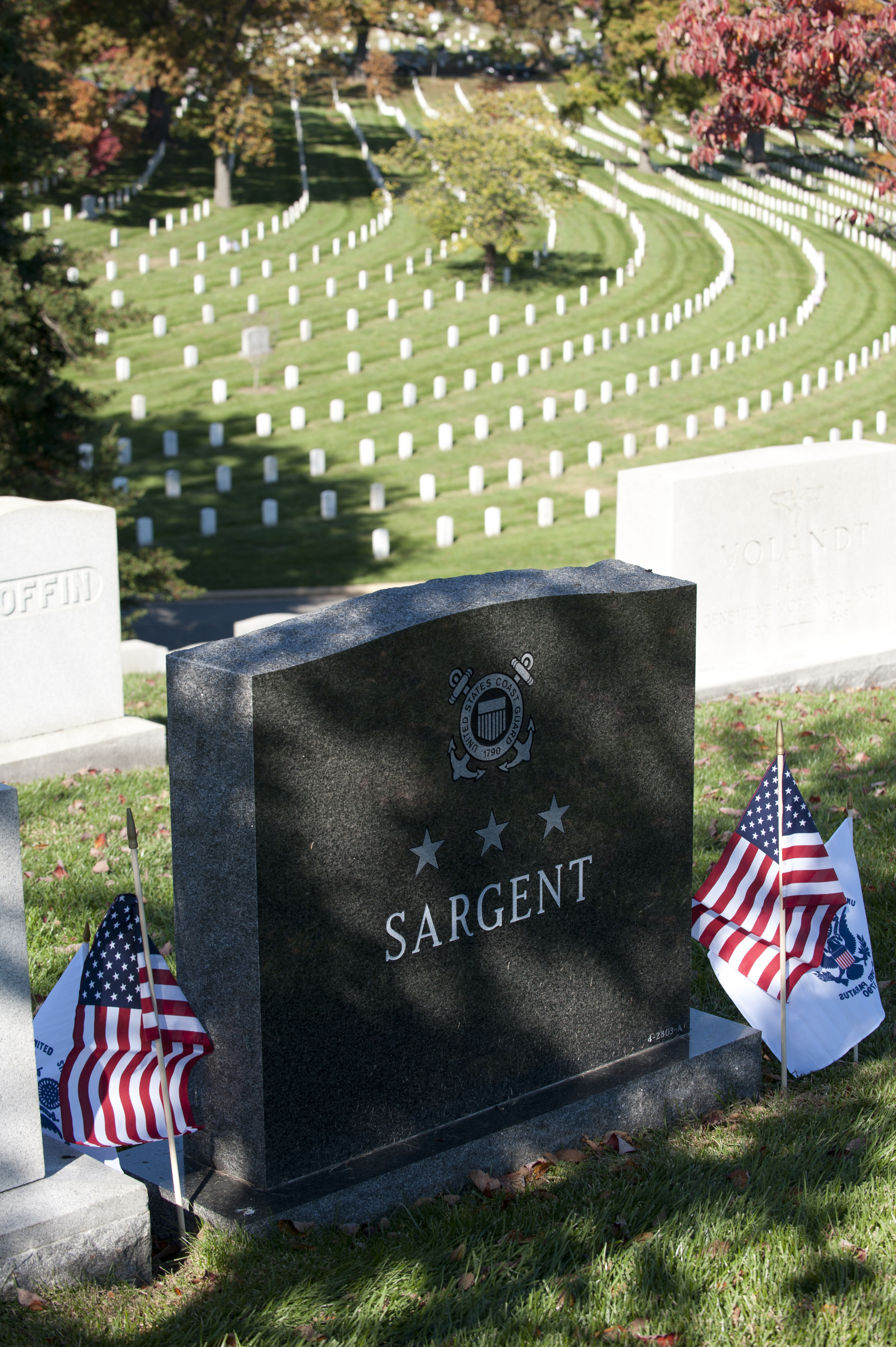
Grave of Thomas R. Sargent at Arlington National Cemetery (2011)

Sargent graduated from the United States Coast Guard Academy in 1938. He was then assigned to USCGC Tahoe.

During World War II, Sargent first served aboard USCGC Modoc. After commanding a United States Navy submarine chaser, he was assigned to USCGC Duane before becoming the first commander of USS Sandusky and serving in the Philippines Campaign.

After the war, he was stationed at the Coast Guard Academy. He then served as executive officer of USCGC Bibb from 1950 to 1951 and later as commanding officer of USCGC Winnebago from 1954 to 1956. During the Vietnam War, he supervised the development and construction of LORAN transmitting stations in Thailand and Vietnam.

In 1968, Sargent was named chief of staff of the United States Coast Guard. He became assistant commandant of the Coast Guard in 1970. The title was changed to vice commandant in 1972. He remained in the position until his retirement in 1974.

During his career, he was awarded the Legion of Merit, the Bronze Star Medal, the Coast Guard Commendation Medal, the American Defense Service Medal, the American Campaign Medal, the European-African-Middle Eastern Campaign Medal, the Asiatic-Pacific Campaign Medal, the World War II Victory Medal, the National Defense Service Medal, the Philippine Liberation Medal and the Philippine Republic Presidential Unit Citation.

In a ceremony held November 9, 2017, Sargent was inducted into the United States Coast Guard Academy's 2017 Wall of Gallantry in recognition of distinguished acts of heroic service by a board of academy cadets.

== Dates of rank ==
Ensign	Lieutenant, Junior Grade	Lieutenant	Lieutenant Commander	Commander	Captain
O-1	O-2	O-3	O-4	O-5	O-6
June 2, 1938	July 28, 1941	June 26, 1942	December 1, 1943	January 26, 1951	July 1, 1960

Commodore	Rear Admiral	Vice Admiral
O-7	O-8	O-9
Never held	July 1, 1967	July 1, 1970
