= USCGC Kukui (WAK-186) =

Cargo ship of the United States Coast Guard

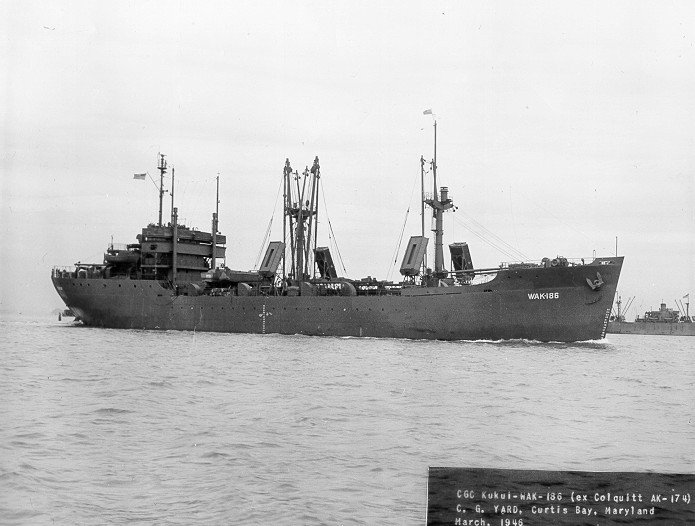
- USCGC Kukui (WAK-186), ex-USS Colquitt (AK-174), underway off the Coast Guard Yard at Curtis Bay, Maryland, 16 March 1946.

History

United States
- Name: Colquitt
- Namesake: Colquitt County, Georgia
- Ordered: as type (C1-M-AV1) hull, MC hull 2147
- Builder: Froemming Brothers, Inc., Milwaukee, Wisconsin
- Yard number: 19
- Laid down: 1944
- Launched: 21 January 1945
- Sponsored by: Mrs. Fred Zillman
- Acquired: 17 August 1945
- Commissioned: 22 September 1945
- Decommissioned: 24 September 1945
- Stricken: 20 March 1946
- Identification: Hull symbol: AK-174; Code letters: NRCQ
- Fate: transferred to the US Coast Guard, 24 September 1945
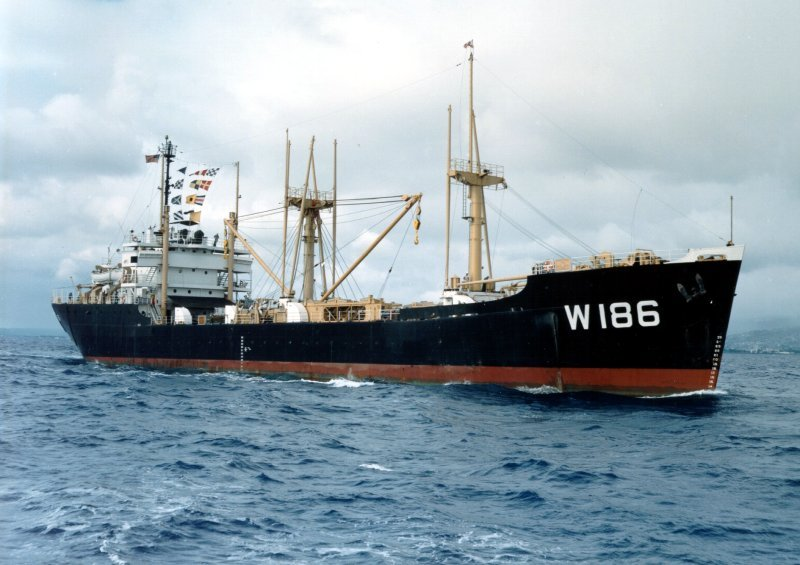
- USCGC Kukui (WAK-186) underway, date and location unknown.

United States
- Name: Kukui
- Namesake: Kukui
- Acquired: 24 September 1945
- Commissioned: 24 September 1945
- Decommissioned: 29 February 1972
- Identification: Hull symbol: WAK-186
- Fate: Transferred to the Republic of the Philippines, 1 March 1972

History

Philippines
- Name: Mactan
- Namesake: Mactan Island
- Acquired: 1 March 1972
- Identification: Hull symbol: TK90
- Fate: Deleted by the Philippines Navy, 7 June 2001

General characteristics
- Class & type: Alamosa-class cargo ship
- Type: C1-M-AV1
- Tonnage: 5,032 long tons deadweight (DWT)
- Displacement: 2,382 long tons (2,420 t) (standard); 7,450 long tons (7,570 t) (full load)
- Length: 388 ft 8 in (118.47 m)
- Beam: 50 ft (15 m)
- Draft: 21 ft 1 in (6.43 m)
- Installed power: 1 × Nordberg, TSM 6 diesel engine; 1,750 shp (1,300 kW)
- Propulsion: 1 × propeller
- Speed: 11.5 kn (21.3 km/h; 13.2 mph)
- Capacity: 3,945 t (3,883 long tons) DWT; 9,830 cu ft (278 m^{3}) (refrigerated); 227,730 cu ft (6,449 m^{3}) (non-refrigerated)
- Complement: 15 Officers; 70 Enlisted
- Armament: 1 × 3 in (76 mm)/50 caliber dual purpose gun (DP); 6 × 20 mm (0.8 in) Oerlikon anti-aircraft (AA) cannons

USCGC Kukui (WAK-186) was a Maritime Commission Type C1-M small cargo ship launched 21 January 1945, by Froemming Brothers, Milwaukee, Wisconsin, transferred to the Navy and commissioned and designated as USS Colquitt (AK-174) 22 September 1945. Two days later the ship was transferred to the Coast Guard for operation before being permanently transferred on 11 March 1946. Renamed Kukui and designated WAK-186 the ship was the largest in the Coast Guard with notable service installing, servicing and supplying the Loran-A and Loran-C electronic navigation chain stations in the Pacific until March 1972. The ship was transferred to the Philippines to serve as the Philippine Navy's supply ship BRP Mactan (TK90) until June 2001.

== Construction ==
Colquitt was launched 21 January 1945, by Froemming Brothers, Milwaukee, Wisconsin, under a Maritime Commission contract, MC hull 2147; sponsored by Mrs. Fred Zillman.

== US Navy service ==
The ship was transferred to the Navy 17 August 1945 and commissioned USS Colquitt, designated AK-174, on 22 September 1945. Two days later the ship was transferred to the US Coast Guard for operation with permanent transfer on 11 March 1946. In the very brief Navy service the ship was one of the Alamosa-class cargo ships.

== Coast Guard history ==
On permanent transfer the ship was renamed and reclassified Kukui (WAK-186) as the needed large cargo vessel to supply the equipment and personnel for the construction and logistical support of the Pacific Loran-A and Loran-C systems. Her name was changed to Kukui, a name taken from a buoy tender that had just been decommissioned, and was given the designation WAK-186. She was converted to Coast Guard specifications at the Coast Guard Yard in Curtis Bay, Maryland. During her Coast Guard career she was based out of Honolulu, Hawaii.

Construction, major maintenance and supply of the systems was done by sailors of Kukui. Their dual role as seamen and construction workers was one of the most unique assignments in the armed forces. She carried on her decks two LCMs to ferry men and equipment to shore and also had three bulldozers, several trucks and a few jeeps stashed in her holds.

Seven months a year she was underway providing necessary logistic support to members of the Coast Guard LORAN chain throughout the western Pacific. During this time she delivered "everything from toothpicks to antenna poles; from a can of pepper to a Quonset hut." She also carried the complex electronic equipment necessary to set up the LORAN system. As a Coast Guard public affairs release noted: "The men and officers of the black-hulled cutter were a versatile group. They not only sailed the ship but they operated bulldozers, landing craft, trucks and jeeps."

A typical voyage would cover over 18,000 nmi (33,000 km; 21,000 mi) and Kukui would deliver 2,500,000 short tons (2,300,000 t) of cargo to the many Coast Guard operated LORAN stations throughout the western Pacific. In all she would make over 20 stops at various stations and ports, including Yokosuka, Japan and Manila Harbor in the Republic of the Philippines. On 15 June 1953 she rendered medical assistance to a civilian workman injured at Batan LORAN station. In 1957 the crew of the Kukui observed a lack of books in the Philippine school districts they visited. The following year they got up a collection of 400 books to give to needy schoolchildren. Through hard work and perseverance they increased the total to 45,000 books within the next three years. She also delivered relief supplies to the island of Batan after it was hit by Typhoon Elaine.

On 1 December 1969, French Frigate Shoals LORAN Station was hit by a tidal wave, forcing the crew to evacuate and destroying much of the station. Kukui was sent to the island the following month and was responsible for her reconstruction and rehabilitation. On 24 June 1970 she collided with the M/V Myoriki Maru No. 25 six miles from Yokosuka, Japan, with both vessels receiving minor damage.

In January 1972, the Kukui received word that as part of a move to reduce Coast Guard spending, she would be decommissioned. She later received word that upon her decommissioning in Honolulu on 1 March 1972, she would be turned over to the Navy who in turn would give her to the Philippine Navy.

== Philippine Navy history ==
Kukui was transferred to the Republic of the Philippines, renamed BRP Mactan (TK90), and reclassified a supply ship. She was removed from the Philippines Navy 7 June 2001.

== Awards and decorations ==
Her crew members were eligible for the following medals:

- American Campaign Medal
- Asiatic–Pacific Campaign Medal
- World War II Victory Medal
- National Defense Service Medal with two stars

== Notes ==
Citations

== Bibliography ==
Online resources

- "Colquitt". Dictionary of American Naval Fighting Ships. Naval History and Heritage Command. This article incorporates text from this source, which is in the public domain.
- Colton, Tim (28 August 2009). "C1 Cargo Ships". ShipbuildingHistory.
- "USS Colquitt (AK-174)". NavSource. 15 May 2015.
- "Kukui, 1946" (PDF). US Coast Guard. Archived from the original (PDF) on 30 April 2017.
