= USS Ogden (PF-39) =

Tacoma-class patrol frigate

History

United States
- Name: Ogden
- Namesake: City of Ogden, Utah
- Reclassified: PF-39, 15 April 1943
- Builder: Consolidated Steel Corporation, Wilmington, California
- Laid down: 21 May 1943
- Launched: 23 June 1943
- Sponsored by: Miss Margaret S. Shelton
- Commissioned: 20 December 1943
- Decommissioned: 12 July 1945
- Honors and awards: 3 battle stars, World War II
- Fate: Transferred to the Soviet Navy, 12 July 1945
- Acquired: Returned by Soviet Navy, 15 October 1949
- Fate: Transferred to the Japan Maritime Self-Defense Force, 14 January 1953
- Acquired: Returned by Japan Maritime Self-Defense Force, 28 June 1977
- Fate: Scrapped, 1977

Soviet Union
- Name: EK-10
- Acquired: 12 July 1945
- Commissioned: 12 July 1945
- Fate: Returned to United States, 15 October 1949

Japan
- Name: Kusu
- Acquired: 14 January 1953
- Renamed: YAS-37, 1962
- Renamed: YAC-22, 1964
- Decommissioned: 1 April 1976
- Fate: Returned to United States, 28 June 1977

General characteristics
- Class & type: Tacoma-class frigate
- Displacement: 1,264 long tons (1,284 t)
- Length: 303 ft 11 in (92.63 m)
- Beam: 37 ft 6 in (11.43 m)
- Draft: 13 ft 8 in (4.17 m)
- Propulsion: 2 × 5,500 shp (4,101 kW) turbines; 3 boilers; 2 shafts
- Speed: 20 knots (37 km/h; 23 mph)
- Complement: 190
- Armament: 3 × 3"/50 dual purpose guns (3x1); 4 x 40 mm guns (2×2); 9 × 20 mm guns (9×1); 1 × Hedgehog anti-submarine mortar; 8 × Y-gun depth charge projectors; 2 × Depth charge tracks

The first USS Ogden (PF-39) was a Tacoma-class frigate in commission from 1943 to 1945. Originally classified as PG-147, she was the first ship of the United States Navy to be named for Ogden, Utah. She later served in the Soviet Navy as EK-10 and in the Japan Maritime Self-Defense Force as Kusu (PF-1), Kusu (PF-281), YAS-50 and YAC-22.

== Construction and commissioning ==
Ogden was laid down at the Consolidated Steel Corporation shipyard in Los Angeles, California, on 21 May 1943, launched on 23 June 1943, sponsored by Miss Margaret S. Shelton, and commissioned at San Diego, California, on 20 December 1943.

== Service history ==
=== U.S. Navy, World War II, 1944–1945 ===
After shakedown out of San Diego, Ogden left San Perdo, California, on 9 March 1944 escorting a convoy via Samoa to Milne Bay, New Guinea, which she reached on 2 April 1944. During this time, she sailed in company with her sister ship USS Van Buren (PF-42) and escorted the merchant tanker SS Fort Erie to Espiritu Santo from 23 to 29 March 1944. Through July 1944 she took part in the operations leap-frogging westward in New Guinea, escorting landing ships and merchant vessels, conducting anti-submarine patrols, and serving as harbor entrance control ship at Humboldt Bay.

Following repairs and training at Brisbane, Australia, in August and September 1944, Ogden supported the buildup of men and shipping for the forthcoming invasion of the Philippine Islands, twice escorting convoys from Manus in the Admiralty Islands to New Guinea staging bases. She herself arrived at Leyte in the Philippines on 2 November 1944, bringing up a convoy which included a U.S. Navy tanker, an Australian merchant ship, and ten tugs pulling a variety of tows. When Japanese planes attacked her convoy that night, one bomb missed her by only 50 yards (46 m).

Ogden returned to New Guinea twice to bring reinforcement convoys to Leyte, and on 12 November 1944 shot down three Japanese kamikaze suicide planes attacking merchant shipping off Leyte. Her gunners scored again off New Guinea on 29 November 1944, assisting in the destruction of two of the torpedo planes which attacked her Leyte-bound convoy.

Ogden left Humboldt Bay on 14 December 1944, bound for Manus, Bora Bora, the Panama Canal, Charleston, South Carolina, and Boston, Massachusetts, where she arrived on 24 January 1945 for repairs, followed by training in Casco Bay, Maine.

Ogden got underway from Casco Bay on 28 March 1945 as part of Escort Division 25 – which also included her sister ships USS Long Beach (PF-34) (the flagship), USS Belfast (PF-35), USS Glendale (PF-36), USS San Pedro (PF-37), and USS Coronado (PF-38) – bound for Seattle, Washington, via the Panama Canal. The six patrol frigates arrived at Seattle on 26 April 1945. They got underway again for Kodiak in the Territory of Alaska on 7 June 1945, but Ogden had to turn around and return to Seattle for repairs.

After repairs, Ogden resumed her voyage and on 27 June 1945 joined her sister ships Long Beach, Belfast, Glendale, San Pedro, Coronado, USS Charlottesville (PF-25), USS Allentown (PF-52), USS Machias (PF-53), and USS Sandusky (PF-54) at Cold Bay, Alaska, to participate in Project Hula, a secret program for the transfer of U.S. Navy ships to the Soviet Navy in anticipation of the Soviet Union joining the war against Japan. Training of Ogden's new Soviet Navy crew soon began at Cold Bay.

=== Soviet Navy, 1945–1949 ===
Ogden was decommissioned on 12 July 1945 at Cold Bay and transferred to the Soviet Union under Lend-Lease immediately along with nine of her sister ships, the first group of patrol frigates transferred to the Soviet Navy. Commissioned into the Soviet Navy immediately, Ogden was designated as a storozhevoi korabl ("escort ship") and renamed EK-10 in Soviet service. On 15 July 1945, EK-10 departed Cold Bay in company with nine of her sister ships – EK-1 (ex-Charlottesville), EK-2 (ex-Long Beach), EK-3 (ex-Belfast), EK-4 (ex-Machias), EK-5 (ex-San Pedro), EK-6 (ex-Glendale), EK-7 (ex-Sandusky), EK-8 (ex-Coronado), and EK-9 (ex-Allentown) – bound for Petropavlovsk-Kamchatsky in the Soviet Union. EK-10 served as a patrol vessel in the Soviet Far East.

In February 1946, the United States began negotiations for the return of ships loaned to the Soviet Union for use during World War II. On 8 May 1947, United States Secretary of the Navy James V. Forrestal informed the United States Department of State that the United States Department of the Navy wanted 480 of the 585 combatant ships it had transferred to the Soviet Union for World War II use returned, EK-10 among them. Negotiations for the return of the ships was protracted, but on 15 October 1949 the Soviet Union finally returned EK-10 to the U.S. Navy at Yokosuka, Japan.

=== Japan Maritime Self-Defense Force, 1953–1977 ===
Reverting to her original name, Ogden was placed in reserve at Yokosuka until transferred to Japan on 14 January 1953, when she became one of the first ships the United States loaned to Japan under the Mutual Defense Assistance Program to serve in the Japanese Safety Security Force as Kusu (PF-1) (くす (PF-1); "camphor tree"). She simultaneously was assigned to the 1st Fleet, which was created that day, along with her sister ships Nara (ex-USS Machias (PF-53)), Kashi (ex-USS Pasco (PF-6)), and Momi (ex-USS Poughkeepsie (PF-26)), all similarly lent to Japan. All four ships were assigned to the Yokosuka District Force. On 1 April 1953, the 1st Fleet became part of the newly created 1st Fleet Group. The 1st Fleet later was renamed the 1st Escort Corps.

In 1954, the Safety Security Force became the Japan Maritime Self-Defense Force (JMSDF). On 1 April 1956, Kusu was transferred to the 11th Escort Flotilla, which the JMSDF formed that day. On 10 May 1957, the 11th Escort Flotilla was abolished and its ships became part of the new 1st Training Corps, under which Kusu participated in the 1st Training Corps's first oceanic training voyage. Kusu was redesignated PF-281 on 1 September 1957

Kusu was transferred to the Yokosuka District Force on 10 December 1963. In 1964 she was converted into a mother ship for drones. The conversion included the removal of her after 3-inch (76.2 mm) gun and reduction of her Oerlikon 20 mm cannon, Y-gun depth charge projector, and depth charge track armament and the installation of a drone storage and maintenance hangar.

Kusu was reclassified as an "auxiliary service craft" and renamed YAS-50 on 31 March 1970, then reclassified as an "auxiliary storage vessel" and renamed YAC-22 on 31 March 1971. She was decommissioned on 1 April 1976 and returned to U.S. custody on 28 June 1977. She was scrapped in 1977.

== Awards ==
The U.S. Navy awarded Ogden three battle stars for her World War II service.
