= USS Allentown =

Tacoma-class patrol frigate

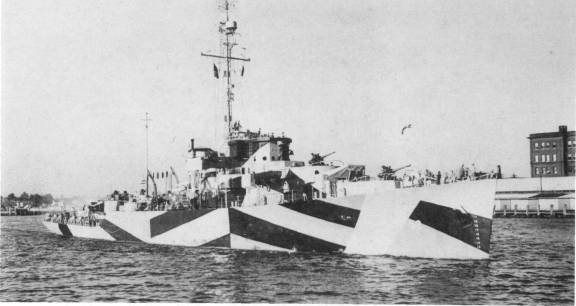
- USS Allentown (PF-52) underway near Norfolk Navy Yard, Portsmouth, Virginia, on 9 August 1944. She is painted in Measure 32/16D dazzle camouflage.

History

United States
- Name: Allentown
- Namesake: City of Allentown, Pennsylvania
- Builder: Froemming Brothers, Inc., Milwaukee, Wisconsin
- Laid down: 23 March 1943
- Reclassified: PF-52, 15 April 1943
- Launched: 3 July 1943
- Sponsored by: Miss Joyce E. Beary
- Commissioned: 24 March 1944
- Decommissioned: 12 July 1945
- Honors and awards: 2 battle stars, World War II
- Fate: Transferred to the Soviet Navy 12 July 1945
- Acquired: Returned by Soviet Navy, 15 October 1949
- Fate: Transferred to Japan Maritime Self-Defense Force, 2 April 1953
- Stricken: 1 December 1961
- Acquired: Returned by Japan Maritime Self-Defense Force, 12 July 1971
- Fate: Broken up in Taiwan 1971

Soviet Union
- Name: EK-9
- Acquired: 12 July 1945
- Commissioned: 12 July 1945
- Fate: Returned to United States, 15 October 1949

Japan
- Name: Ume
- Acquired: 2 April 1953
- Renamed: YAC-14, 31 March 1965
- Reclassified: Auxiliary stock craft (YAC), 31 March 1965
- Decommissioned: 31 March 1970
- Fate: Returned to United States, 12 July 1971

General characteristics
- Class & type: Tacoma-class frigate
- Displacement: 1,430 long tons (1,453 t) light; 2,415 long tons (2,454 t) full
- Length: 303 ft 11 in (92.63 m)
- Beam: 37 ft 6 in (11.43 m)
- Draft: 13 ft 8 in (4.17 m)
- Propulsion: 2 × 5,500 shp (4,101 kW) turbines; 3 boilers; 2 shafts
- Speed: 20 knots (37 km/h; 23 mph)
- Complement: 190
- Armament: 3 × 3"/50 dual purpose guns (3x1); 4 x 40 mm guns (2×2); 9 × 20 mm guns (9×1); 1 × Hedgehog anti-submarine mortar; 8 × Y-gun depth charge projectors; 2 × Depth charge tracks

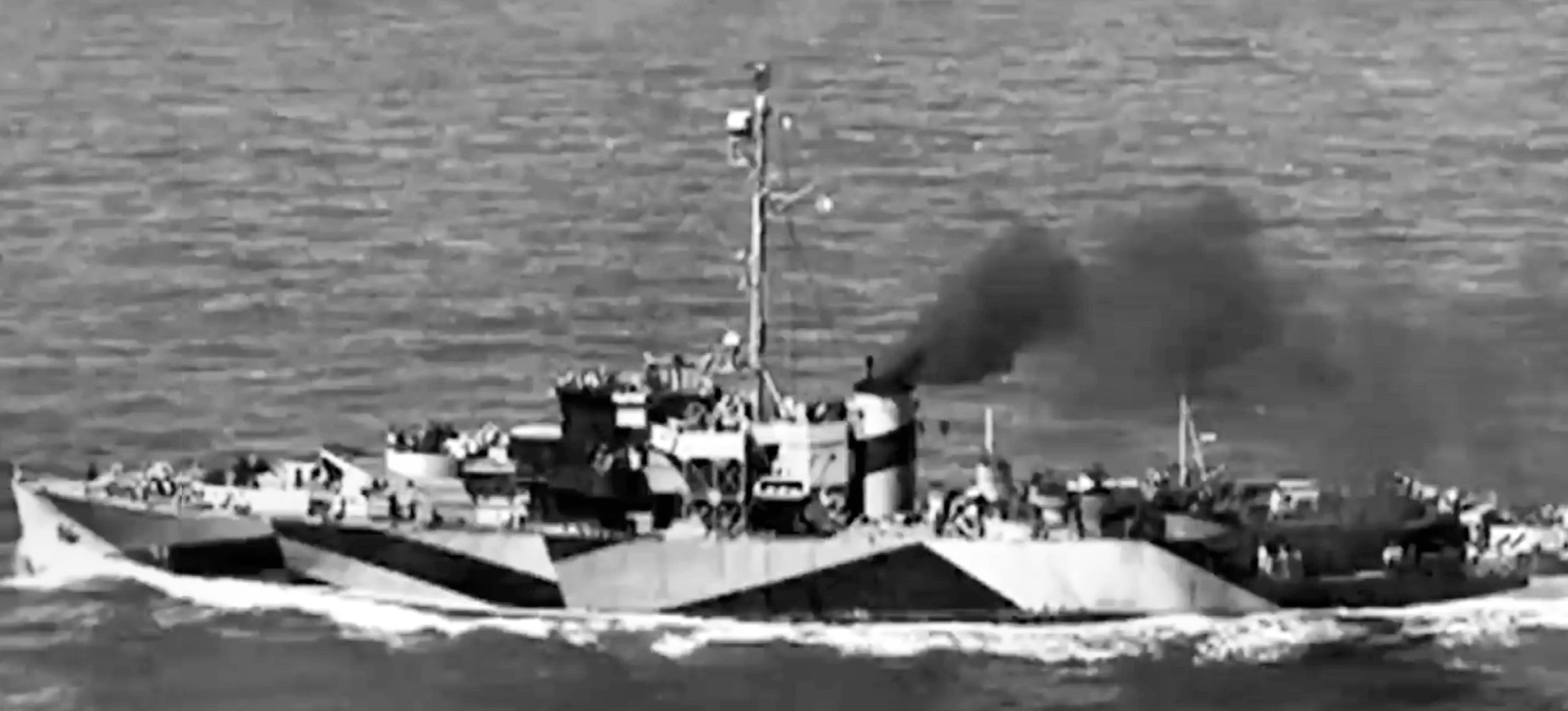
USS Allentown (PF-52) underway in the Atlantic Ocean off Hampton Roads, Virginia, on 9 August 1944. She is painted in Measure 32/16D dazzle camouflage.

USS Allentown (PF-52), a United States Navy Tacoma-class frigate in commission from 1944 to 1945, has thus far been the only U.S. Navy ship to be named for Allentown, Pennsylvania. She later served in the Soviet Navy as EK-9 and in the Japan Maritime Self-Defense Force as JDS Ume (PF-9), JDS Ume (PF-289) and as YAC-14.

== Construction and commissioning ==
Allentown was laid down on 23 March 1943, at the Froemming Brothers, Inc., shipyard in Milwaukee, Wisconsin, under a Maritime Commission contract (MC hull 1477). Launched on 3 July 1943, sponsored by Miss Joyce E. Beary, she was moved to New Orleans, Louisiana, where she fitted out and was commissioned on 24 March 1944.

== Service history ==
=== U.S. Navy, World War II, 1944–1945 ===
Allentown departed New Orleans on 3 April 1944 bound for shakedown training at Bermuda. After about a month of training, she set a course for New York City escorting the Norwegian merchant ship SS Norden. She arrived in New York on 13 May 1944 and underwent post-shakedown repairs and alterations. Near the end of June 1944, she stood out of New York in the screen of a convoy. She arrived at Norfolk, Virginia, on 28 June 1944 and entered the Norfolk Navy Yard at Portsmouth, Virginia, for additional repairs. She completed repairs in mid-August 1944 and returned to New York, where she arrived on 16 August 1944. Soon thereafter, she returned to sea as a unit of Escort Division 33 in the screen of a convoy bound for the Pacific.

Steaming via the Panama Canal and Bora Bora in the Society Islands, Allentown reached the northern coast of New Guinea at the end of September 1944. She then began patrol and escort duty in the New Guinea area. At the end of October 1944, she participated briefly in the occupation of the island of Morotai in the Molucca Islands. In mid-November 1944, she began escorting convoys between Hollandia, New Guinea, and Leyte in the Philippines in support of the U.S. invasion there. Those duties and convoy-escort missions between the various islands of the Philippine archipelago occupied her time until early March 1945. On 9 March, Allentown joined the escort of a Ulithi-bound convoy on the first leg of her voyage back to the United States. She arrived at the Puget Sound Navy Yard in Bremerton, Washington, on 7 April 1945.

After completing an overhaul, Allentown departed Puget Sound on 7 June 1945, bound for Kodiak in the Territory of Alaska. Earmarked for transfer to the Soviet Navy in Project Hula, a secret program for the transfer of U.S. Navy ships to the Soviet Navy in anticipation of the Soviet Union joining the war against Japan, Allentown joined her sister ships USS Charlottesville (PF-25), USS Long Beach (PF-34), USS Belfast (PF-35), USS Glendale (PF-36), USS San Pedro (PF-37), USS Coronado (PF-38), USS Machias (PF-53), and USS Sandusky (PF-54) in getting underway from Kodiak on 13 June 1945 bound for Cold Bay, Alaska, where they arrived on 14 June 1945 to enter Project Hula. Training of Allentown's new Soviet Navy crew soon began at Cold Bay.

=== Soviet Navy, 1945–1949 ===
Allentown was decommissioned on 12 July 1945 at Cold Bay and transferred to the Soviet Union under Lend-Lease immediately along with nine of her sister ships, the first group of patrol frigates transferred to the Soviet Navy. Commissioned into the Soviet Navy immediately, Allentown was designated as a storozhevoi korabl ("escort ship") and renamed EK-9 in Soviet service. On 15 July 1945, EK-9 departed Cold Bay in company with nine of her sister ships – EK-1 (ex-Charlottesville), EK-2 (ex-Long Beach), EK-3 (ex-Belfast), EK-4 (ex-Machias), EK-5 (ex-San Pedro), EK-6 (ex-Glendale), EK-7 (ex-Sandusky), EK-8 (ex-Coronado), and EK-10 (ex-USS Ogden (PF-39)) – bound for Petropavlovsk-Kamchatsky in the Soviet Union. EK-9 served as a patrol vessel in the Soviet Far East.

In February 1946, the United States began negotiations for the return of ships loaned to the Soviet Union for use during World War II. On 8 May 1947, United States Secretary of the Navy James V. Forrestal informed the United States Department of State that the United States Department of the Navy wanted 480 of the 585 combatant ships it had transferred to the Soviet Union for World War II use returned, EK-9 among them. Negotiations for the return of the ships were protracted, but on 15 October 1949 the Soviet Union finally returned EK-9 to the U.S. Navy at Yokosuka, Japan.

=== Japan Maritime Self-Defense Force, 1953–1971 ===
Reverting to her former name, Allentown remained at Yokosuka, laid up in the Pacific Reserve Fleet, until 2 April 1953 when she was loaned to Japan. She served the Japan Maritime Self-Defense Force as JDS Ume (PF-9) (うめ (PF-9); "Japanese apricot"). Ume was redesignated PF-289 on 1 September 1957. The United States struck her name from the Navy list on 1 December 1961 and transferred her to Japan on a permanent basis on 28 August 1962.

Ume was reclassified as an "auxiliary stock craft" and renamed YAC-14 on 31 March 1965. Decommissioned on 31 March 1970, she was returned to U.S. custody on 12 July 1971 and broken up in Taiwan later that year.

== Awards ==
The U.S. Navy awarded Allentown two battle stars for her World War II service.
