= USS Chicot =

American cargo ship

History

United States
- Name: Chicot
- Namesake: Chicot County, Arkansas
- Ordered: as type (C1-M-AV1) hull, MC hull 2143
- Builder: Froemming Brothers, Inc., Milwaukee, Wisconsin
- Yard number: 15
- Laid down: 1944
- Launched: 16 July 1944
- Sponsored by: Mrs. F. Marasco
- Acquired: 13 March 1945
- Commissioned: 4 April 1945
- Decommissioned: 18 July 1946
- Acquired: 14 May 1947
- Recommissioned: 23 June 1947
- Decommissioned: 24 July 1951
- Stricken: 2 August 1946; 18 January 1952
- Identification: Hull symbol: AK-170; Code letters: NEGZ
- Fate: Sold, 19 September 1960

History

Panama
- Name: San Luis
- Owner: James and Guerrero Co., Inc., Agana, Guam
- Acquired: 19 September 1960
- Fate: Sold for scrapping in Panama in 1972

General characteristics
- Class & type: Alamosa-class cargo ship
- Type: C1-M-AV1
- Tonnage: 5,032 long tons deadweight (DWT)
- Displacement: 2,382 long tons (2,420 t) (standard); 7,450 long tons (7,570 t) (full load)
- Length: 388 ft 8 in (118.47 m)
- Beam: 50 ft (15 m)
- Draft: 21 ft 1 in (6.43 m)
- Installed power: 1 × Nordberg, TSM 6 diesel engine; 1,750 shp (1,300 kW)
- Propulsion: 1 × propeller
- Speed: 11.5 kn (21.3 km/h; 13.2 mph)
- Capacity: 3,945 t (3,883 long tons) DWT; 9,830 cu ft (278 m^{3}) (refrigerated); 227,730 cu ft (6,449 m^{3}) (non-refrigerated)
- Complement: 15 Officers; 70 Enlisted
- Armament: 1 × 3 in (76 mm)/50 caliber dual purpose gun (DP); 6 × 20 mm (0.8 in) Oerlikon anti-aircraft (AA) cannons

USS Chicot (AK-170) was an Alamosa-class cargo ship commissioned by the US Navy for service in World War II. She was responsible for delivering troops, goods and equipment to locations in the war zone.

== Construction ==
Chicot was launched 16 July 1944, by Froemming Brothers, Inc., Milwaukee, Wisconsin, under a Maritime Commission contract, MC hull 2143; sponsored by Mrs. F. Marasco; acquired by the Navy 13 March 1945; and commissioned 4 April 1945.

== Service history ==
=== World War II Pacific Theatre operations ===
Chicot sailed from Gulfport, Mississippi, 10 May 1945 for Honolulu, where she discharged cargo then voyaged to San Francisco, California, returning to Pearl Harbor with another load of cargo 24 July. She put out of Pearl Harbor 30 July with cargo for Eniwetok, and until 10 March 1946, remained in the western Pacific, carrying cargo between Eniwetok, Ulithi, Tacloban, Saipan, Okinawa, Guam, Manus, Samar, and Subic Bay. She departed Guam 10 March for the west coast, and on 18 July 1946 was decommissioned at Seattle, Washington, and returned to the Maritime Commission the next day.

=== Post-war reactivation ===
Chicot was reacquired 14 May 1947, and after repair, recommissioned 23 June 1947. She departed Seattle 18 July for Pearl Harbor. From 19 November, when she sailed from Guam and Pearl Harbor, Chicot carried cargo between the islands of the western Pacific, calling at Saipan, Truk, Ponape, Manus, and Kusaie. After local operations at Hawaii, she made a voyage to Guam and Saipan early in 1949, and returned to San Francisco 15 March.

Chicot cleared San Pedro 27 April 1949 for cargo duty in the islands of the western Pacific, to Pearl Harbor and to Japan. Guam was her base until 24 July 1951, when she was decommissioned there and transferred to the Department of the Interior.

== Merchant service ==
Chicot was sold 19 September 1960, to shipper James and Guerrero Company, Inc., of Agana, Guam. She was renamed San Luis and reflagged for Panama.

== Notes ==
Citations

== Bibliography ==
Online resources

- "Chicot". Dictionary of American Naval Fighting Ships. Naval History and Heritage Command. This article incorporates text from this source, which is in the public domain.
- "C1 Cargo Ships". www.ShipbuildingHistory.com. 28 August 2009.
- "USS Chicot (AK-170)". NavSource. 18 July 2014.
