= USS Claiborne =

Cargo ship of the United States Navy

History

United States
- Name: Claiborne
- Namesake: Claiborne Parish, Louisiana, or; Claiborne County, Mississippi, or; Claiborne County, Tennessee
- Ordered: as type (C1-M-AV1) hull, MC hull 2144
- Builder: Froemming Brothers, Inc, Milwaukee, Wisconsin
- Yard number: 16
- Laid down: 1944
- Launched: 3 September 1944
- Sponsored by: Miss L. Kapczynski
- Commissioned: 19 April 1945
- Decommissioned: 7 February 1946
- Stricken: 5 June 1946
- Identification: Hull symbol: AK-171; Code letters: NEHW
- Fate: Sold for scrapping, 6 January 1971

General characteristics
- Class & type: Alamosa-class cargo ship
- Type: C1-M-AV1
- Tonnage: 5,032 long tons deadweight (DWT)
- Displacement: 2,382 long tons (2,420 t) (standard); 7,450 long tons (7,570 t) (full load)
- Length: 388 ft 8 in (118.47 m)
- Beam: 50 ft (15 m)
- Draft: 21 ft 1 in (6.43 m)
- Installed power: 1 × Nordberg, TSM 6 diesel engine; 1,750 shp (1,300 kW)
- Propulsion: 1 × propeller
- Speed: 11.5 kn (21.3 km/h; 13.2 mph)
- Capacity: 3,945 t (3,883 long tons) DWT; 9,830 cu ft (278 m^{3}) (refrigerated); 227,730 cu ft (6,449 m^{3}) (non-refrigerated)
- Complement: 10 Officers; 69 Enlisted
- Armament: 1 × 3 in (76 mm)/50-caliber dual-purpose gun (DP); 6 × 20 mm (0.8 in) Oerlikon anti-aircraft (AA) cannons

USS Claiborne (AK-171) was an Alamosa-class cargo ship commissioned by the U.S. Navy for service in World War II. She was responsible for delivering troops, goods and equipment to locations in the war zone.

== Construction ==
Claiborne was launched 3 September 1944, by Froemming Brothers, Inc., Milwaukee, Wisconsin, under a Maritime Commission contract, MC hull 2144; sponsored by Miss L. Kapczynski; and commissioned 19 April 1945 at New Orleans, Louisiana.

== Service history ==
=== World War II Pacific Theatre operations ===
Claiborne departed Gulfport, Mississippi, 20 May 1945 and arrived at Hollandia, New Guinea, 5 July. For the next 6 months she operated in the Philippines and New Guinea areas, carrying food, and supplies, and helping to redeploy troops among the various islands. Claiborne sailed from Manila 6 January 1946, for Yokosuka, Japan, anchoring there 13 January.

=== Post-war decommissioning ===
Claiborne was decommissioned and transferred to the War Shipping Administration at Tokyo 7 February 1946. The ship was operated by the War Department until placed in the Reserve Fleet berthing area at Olympia, Washington, on 5 May 1950. Ultimately, she was sold to the Marine Power & Equipment Company, on 6 January 1971, and was delivered to her purchaser at Olympia on 1 February 1971 for scrapping.

== Notes ==
Citations

== Bibliography ==
- "Claiborne (AK-171)". Dictionary of American Naval Fighting Ships. Naval History and Heritage Command. 18 October 2016. This article incorporates text from this source, which is in the public domain.
- "C1 Cargo Ships". www.ShipbuildingHistory.com. 28 August 2009.
- "Claiborne (AK-171)". NavSource. 18 July 2014.
