= USS Machias (PF-53) =

Tacoma-class patrol frigate

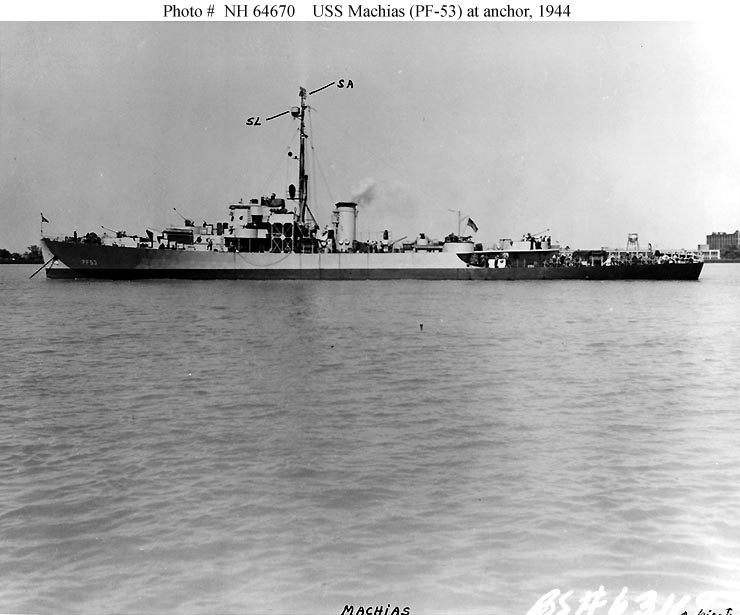
- USS Machias (PF-53) c. March 1944

History

United States
- Name: Machias
- Namesake: City of Machias, Maine
- Reclassified: PF-53, 15 April 1943
- Builder: Froemming Brothers, Inc., Milwaukee, Wisconsin
- Laid down: 8 May 1943
- Launched: 22 August 1943
- Sponsored by: Mrs. W. Richard Bernays
- Commissioned: 29 March 1944
- Decommissioned: 12 July 1945
- Honors and awards: 2 battle stars, World War II
- Fate: Transferred to the Soviet Navy, 12 July 1945
- Acquired: Returned by Soviet Navy, October 1949
- Fate: Transferred to the Japan Maritime Self-Defense Force, 14 January 1953
- Stricken: 1 December 1961

Soviet Union
- Name: EK-4
- Acquired: 12 July 1945
- Commissioned: 12 July 1945
- Fate: Returned to United States, October 1949

Japan
- Name: Nara
- Acquired: By loan 14 January 1953; Permanent transfer 28 August 1962
- Reclassified: PF-282, 1 September 1957
- Decommissioned: 31 March 1966
- Renamed: YTE-8, 31 March 1966
- Reclassified: Pier-side training ship (YTE), 31 March 1966
- Fate: Sold for scrapping 1969

General characteristics
- Class & type: Tacoma-class frigate
- Displacement: 1,430 long tons (1,453 t) light; 2,415 long tons (2,454 t) full
- Length: 303 ft 11 in (92.63 m)
- Beam: 37 ft 6 in (11.43 m)
- Draft: 13 ft 8 in (4.17 m)
- Propulsion: 2 × 5,500 shp (4,101 kW) turbines; 3 boilers; 2 shafts
- Speed: 20 knots (37 km/h; 23 mph)
- Complement: 190
- Armament: 3 × 3"/50 dual purpose guns (3x1); 4 x 40 mm guns (2×2); 9 × 20 mm guns (9×1); 1 × Hedgehog anti-submarine mortar; 8 × Y-gun depth charge projectors; 2 × Depth charge tracks

The second USS Machias (PF-53) was a United States Navy Tacoma-class frigate in commission from 1944 to 1945 which later served in the Soviet Navy as EK-4 and the Japan Maritime Self-Defense Force as JDS Nara (PF-2), JDS Nara (PF-282) and YTE-8.

== Construction and commissioning ==
Machias originally was authorized as a patrol gunboat with the hull number PG-161, but she was redesignated as a patrol frigate with the hull number PF-53 on 15 April 1943. She was laid down under a Maritime Commission contract as a Maritime Commission Type T.S2-S2-AQ1 hull on 8 April 1943 by Froemming Brothers, Inc., at Milwaukee, Wisconsin. She was launched on 22 August 1943, sponsored by Mrs. W. Richard Bernays, and commissioned on 29 March 1944.

== Service history ==
=== U.S. Navy, World War II, 1944–1945 ===
Ready for sea duty by 17 July 1944, Machias patrolled off the Middle Atlantic states and escorted a convoy to Aruba in the Netherlands West Indies before joining Escort Division 33 at Norfolk, Virginia, on 13 August 1944. With that division, she steamed to New York City to become a unit of Task Group 70.7, then assembling to depart for the Pacific Ocean.

The task group departed New York on 16 August 1944, and by 28 August 1944 it had transited the Panama Canal en route Bora Bora. On 25 September 1944, Machias left the convoy to escort the Royal Navy infantry landing ships HMS Empire Arquebus and HMS Empire Battleaxe to the New Hebrides Islands and the Solomon Islands to disembark troops. She rejoined her escort division at Morotai on 23 October 1944 and commenced antisubmarine patrols in the waters surrounding the Molucca Islands.

On 15 November 1944, following a brief stay at Mios Woendi for boiler repairs, Machias steamed with her escort division for the Philippine Islands. She arrived on 18 November 1944 and, after further repairs, took up antisubmarine patrols off Mindanao, primarily in Surigao Strait. She continued in this role until 4 December 1944, when she returned to convoy escort duty. For the next three months she escorted ships and carried military personnel to and from New Guinea, the Philippines, the Marshall Islands, and the Caroline Islands.

Machias departed Eniwetok for Seattle, Washington on 19 March 1945 for an overhaul at Puget Sound Navy Yard at Bremerton, Washington. Upon completion of her overhaul in June 1945, she proceeded to Kodiak in the Territory of Alaska. Earmarked for transfer to the Soviet Navy in Project Hula, a secret program for the transfer of U.S. Navy ships to the Soviet Navy in anticipation of the Soviet Union joining the war against Japan, Machias joined her sister ships USS Charlottesville (PF-25), USS Long Beach (PF-34), USS Belfast (PF-35), USS Glendale (PF-36), USS San Pedro (PF-37), USS Coronado (PF-38), USS Allentown (PF-52), and USS Sandusky (PF-54) in getting underway from Kodiak on 13 June 1945 bound for Cold Bay, Alaska, where they arrived on 14 June 1945 to enter Project Hula. Training of Machias's new Soviet Navy crew soon began at Cold Bay.

=== Soviet Navy, 1945–1949 ===
Machias was decommissioned on 12 July 1945 at Cold Bay and transferred to the Soviet Union under Lend-Lease immediately along with nine of her sister ships, the first group of patrol frigates transferred to the Soviet Navy. Commissioned into the Soviet Navy immediately, Machias was designated as a storozhevoi korabl ("escort ship") and renamed EK-4 in Soviet service. On 15 July 1945, EK-4 departed Cold Bay in company with nine of her sister ships – EK-1 (ex-Charlottesville), EK-2 (ex-Long Beach), EK-3 (ex-Belfast), EK-5 (ex-San Pedro), EK-6 (ex-Glendale), EK-7 (ex-Sandusky), EK-8 (ex-Coronado), EK-9 (ex-Allentown), and EK-10 (ex-USS Ogden (PF-39)) – bound for Petropavlovsk-Kamchatsky in the Soviet Union. EK-4 served as a patrol vessel in the Soviet Far East.

In February 1946, the United States began negotiations for the return of ships loaned to the Soviet Union for use during World War II. On 8 May 1947, United States Secretary of the Navy James V. Forrestal informed the United States Department of State that the United States Department of the Navy wanted 480 of the 585 combatant ships it had transferred to the Soviet Union for World War II use returned, EK-4 among them. Negotiations for the return of the ships were protracted, but in October 1949 the Soviet Union finally returned EK-4 to the U.S. Navy at Yokosuka, Japan.

=== Japan Maritime Self-Defense Force, 1953–1971 ===
Reverting to her original name, Machias remained at Yokosuka in a caretaker status in the Pacific Reserve Fleet until 14 January 1953, when the United States loaned her to Japan. She served in the Japan Maritime Self-Defense Force as JDS Nara (PF-2) (なら (PF-2); "oak"). Nara was redesignated PF-282 on 1 September 1957.

The U.S. Navy struck Machias's name from the Navy List on 1 December 1961, and the United States transferred Nara outright to Japan on 28 August 1962. Decommissioned on 31 March 1966, Nara was redesignated YTE-3 that day and entered non-commissioned service as a non-self-propelled pierside training ship. She was sold for scrapping in 1969.

== Awards ==
- American Campaign Medal
- Asiatic–Pacific Campaign Medal with two battle stars
- World War II Victory Medal
- Medal "For the Victory over Japan" (Soviet Union)
