= USS Van Buren (PF-42) =

Tacoma-class patrol frigate

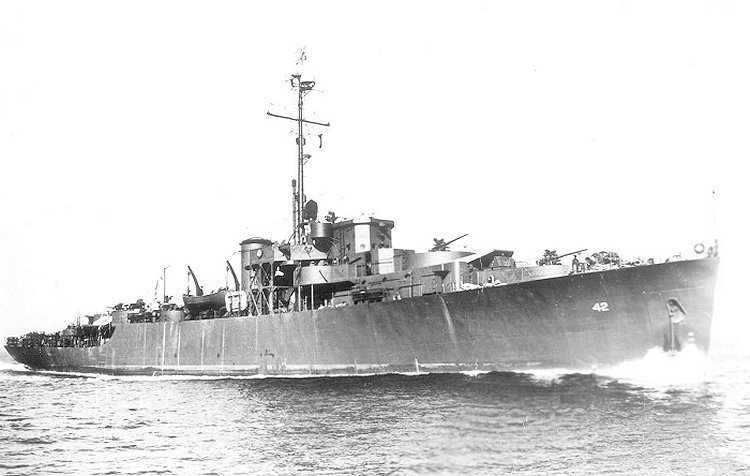
- USS Van Buren (PF-42) conducting a speed trial over the measured mile off Balboa Peninsula, Newport Beach, California, 11 January 1944

History

United States
- Name: Van Buren
- Namesake: City of Van Buren, Arkansas
- Ordered: as a Type S2-S2-AQ1 hull, MCE hull 1453
- Builder: Consolidated Steel Corporation, Wilmington, California
- Reclassified: Patrol Frigate (PF), 15 April 1943
- Laid down: 24 June 1943
- Launched: 27 July 1943
- Commissioned: 17 December 1943
- Decommissioned: 6 May 1946
- Stricken: 19 June 1946
- Identification: Hull symbol: PG-150; Hull symbol: PF-42; Call sign: NZWK
- Honors and awards: 3 × battle stars
- Fate: Sold for scrapping, 1946

General characteristics
- Class & type: Tacoma-class frigate
- Displacement: 1,430 long tons (1,450 t) (light load); 2,415 long tons (2,454 t) (full load)
- Length: 303 ft 11 in (92.63 m)
- Beam: 37 ft 6 in (11.43 m)
- Draft: 13 ft 8 in (4.17 m)
- Installed power: 2 × 3-Drum express boilers , 240 psi (1,700 kPa); 5,500 ihp (4,100 kW)
- Propulsion: 2 × Vertical triple-expansion steam engine; 2 × shafts
- Speed: 20.3 kn (37.6 km/h; 23.4 mph)
- Complement: 190
- Armament: 3 × 3 in (76 mm)/50 caliber dual-purpose (DP) gun; 2 × twin 40 mm (1.57 in) Bofors anti-aircraft (AA) gun mounts; 9 × 20 mm (0.79 in) Oerlikon cannon AA gun mounts; 2 × Depth charge tracks; 8 × Depth charge projectors; 1 × Hedgehog

USS Van Buren (PG-150/PF-42), a Tacoma-class frigate patrol frigate, was the second ship of the United States Navy to hold this name. The first Van Buren, a revenue cutter, was named for President Martin Van Buren; the second Van Buren honors Van Buren, Arkansas.

== Construction ==
Van Buren, originally classified as patrol gunboat PG-150 and reclassified a patrol frigate 15 April 1943, was laid down under a Maritime Commission (MARCOM) contract, MC hull 1453, on 24 June 1943, at the Consolidated Steel Corporation shipyard in Wilmington, California; launched on 27 July 1943, sponsored by Mrs. Edward J. O'Hara; and commissioned at Terminal Island, on 17 December 1943.

== Service history ==
Van Buren conducted shakedown testing off the US west coast before departing San Pedro, California, on 9 March 1944, bound for the western Pacific. She sailed in company with her sister ship Ogden, escorting the merchant tanker SS Fort Erie to Espiritu Santo from 23 to 29 March. Departing that port on 30 March, she arrived at Milne Bay, New Guinea, on 2 April.

On 21 April, Vice Admiral Marc Mitscher's task force of aircraft carriers, battleships, cruisers and destroyers began pounding Japanese airfields and defensive positions on Hollandia, Wakde Airfield, Sawar Airfield and Sarmi, Western New Guinea, to neutralize them during an impending amphibious operation under the command of Rear Admiral Daniel E. Barbey. The next day, Army troops began landing at Aitape and Humboldt Bay. Van Buren escorted convoys supporting this operation into May and June.

As Army forces encountered enemy resistance ashore, naval units were often called on for gunfire support. Van Buren received such a request on the afternoon of 9 June. At 1740, the patrol frigate opened with her main battery, firing salvoes at Japanese troop concentrations near a road in the Sarmi-Sawar sector. Ten days later, the warship again provided gunfire support for the Army near Maffin Village. The next day, Van Buren lobbed 150 rounds of 3-inch (76 mm) and 180 of 40-millimeter (1.6 in) into the Maffin Village sector, with an Army spotting plane providing information on enemy positions. Lying just off the beach, Van Buren demolished her targets and started many fires. An Army plane again provided call-fire guidance on 23 June, when Van Buren once more supported Army troops struggling against the Japanese defenders, breaking up troop concentrations and destroying communications and supplies.

Van Buren subsequently screened the ships supporting the Cape Sansapor operations in August, and continued escort operations into autumn. On 10 November, Van Buren departed Humboldt Bay, bound for Cape Sansapor with a convoy of four LSTs (LST-654, LST-465, LST-471, and LST-697). En route on 16 November, its crew saw an Army plane crash four miles (6.4 km) away. They altered course and used the ship's motor whaleboat to rescue the aircraft's crew, unhurt.

One week later, during operations in the Philippines, Van Buren went to general quarters when El Paso radioed contact with an unidentified plane closing on their vicinity. Van Buren's SA radar picked up the enemy at 18 mi (29 km); her SL receivers picked up the contact at 6 mi (9.7 km). Although ready for action, the frigate did not get a chance to engage, as the plane veered away and passed along the opposite side of the convoy, well beyond gun range.

Van Buren continued her convoy escort and screening duties with the 7th Amphibious Force in the Philippines, into late 1944. After escorting a convoy to Leyte in mid-December, Van Buren sailed via Manus, in the Admiralties, to Hawaii. Arriving at Pearl Harbor on 2 January 1945, Van Buren operated as a training ship attached to the U.S. Pacific Fleet's destroyer forces through the spring of 1945. Shifting to the west coast of the United States, soon thereafter, the patrol vessel arrived at San Francisco, on 2 July. Assigned to Commander, Western Sea Frontier, Van Buren was fitted out as a weather ship and served in that capacity through the end of hostilities with Japan and into the year 1946.

Departing San Francisco, on 13 March 1946, Van Buren transited the Panama Canal, and arrived at Charleston, South Carolina, on 3 April. Decommissioned there on 6 May 1946, Van Buren was struck from the Navy List on 19 June 1946, and sold soon thereafter to the Sun Shipbuilding and Drydock Company of Chester, Pennsylvania, for scrapping.

== Awards ==
Van Buren received three battle stars for World War II service.

== Bibliography ==
- Christ, Mark K. (13 June 2018). "USS Van Buren (PF-42)".
- "Van Buren II (PF-42)". Dictionary of American Naval Fighting Ships. Naval History and Heritage Command. 20 October 2015. This article incorporates text from this source, which is in the public domain.
- "Consolidated Steel, Long Beach and Wilmington CA". ShipbuildingHistory.com. 23 January 2012.
- "USS Van Buren (PF-42)". NavSource.
