= USS Sandusky (PF-54) =

Tacoma-class patrol frigate

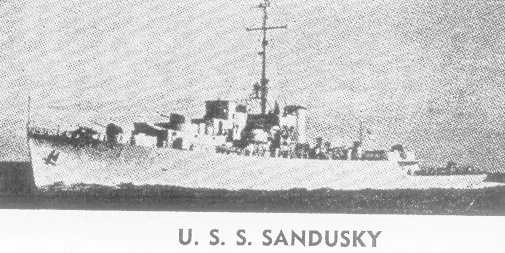
- USS Sandusky (PF-54)

History

United States
- Name: Sandusky
- Namesake: City of Sandusky, Ohio
- Reclassified: PF-54, 15 April 1943
- Builder: Froemming Brothers, Inc., Milwaukee, Wisconsin
- Laid down: 8 July 1943
- Launched: 5 October 1943
- Sponsored by: Miss Mabel Apel
- Commissioned: 18 April 1944
- Decommissioned: 12 July 1945
- Honors and awards: 2 × battle stars, World War II
- Fate: Transferred to the Soviet Navy, 12 July 1945
- Acquired: Returned by Soviet Navy, 15 October 1949
- Fate: Transferred to the Japan Maritime Self-Defense Force, 26 February 1953
- Stricken: 1 December 1961
- Acquired: Returned by Japan Maritime Self-Defense Force, 31 March 1970
- Fate: Scrapped 1970

Soviet Union
- Name: EK-7
- Acquired: 12 July 1945
- Commissioned: 12 July 1945
- Fate: Returned to United States, 15 October 1949

Japan
- Name: Nire
- Acquired: 26 February 1953
- Renamed: YAC-19, 1969
- Reclassified: Auxiliary stock craft (YAC), 1969
- Fate: Returned to United States 31 March 1970 for disposal

General characteristics
- Class & type: Tacoma-class frigate
- Displacement: 1,264 long tons (1,284 t)
- Length: 303 ft 11 in (92.63 m)
- Beam: 37 ft 6 in (11.43 m)
- Draft: 13 ft 8 in (4.17 m)
- Propulsion: 2 × 5,500 shp (4,101 kW) turbines; 3 boilers; 2 shafts
- Speed: 20 knots (37 km/h; 23 mph)
- Complement: 190
- Armament: 3 × 3"/50 dual purpose guns (3x1); 4 x 40 mm guns (2×2); 9 × 20 mm guns (9×1); 1 × Hedgehog anti-submarine mortar; 8 × Y-gun depth charge projectors; 2 × Depth charge tracks

USS Sandusky (PF-54), a Tacoma-class frigate in commission from 1944 to 1945, was the second United States Navy ship of the name and the first to be named for Sandusky, Ohio. She later served in the Soviet Navy as EK-7 and in the Japan Maritime Self-Defense Force as JDS Nire (PF-7), Nire (PF-287) and as YAC-19.

== Construction and commissioning ==
Sandusky, originally classified as a "patrol gunboat," PG-162, was reclassified as a "patrol frigate," PF-54 on 15 April 1943. Laid down on 8 July 1943, under a Maritime Commission contract by Froemming Brothers, Inc., in Milwaukee, Wisconsin, she was launched on 5 October 1943, sponsored by Miss Mabel Apel, and commissioned on 18 April 1944 at New Orleans, Louisiana, with Lieutenant Commander Thomas R. Sargent III, USCG, in command.

== Service history ==
=== U.S. Navy, World War II, 1944–1945 ===
After shakedown at Bermuda and overhaul at Philadelphia, Pennsylvania, Sandusky departed for the Pacific Ocean on 18 August 1944, escorting a convoy from New York City to Finschhafen and Hollandia, New Guinea. After completing the long convoy voyage on 2 October 1944, she proceeded to Morotai, conducting anti-submarine patrols there for the rest of the month. From November 1944 through February 1945, she escorted convoys between Hollandia and Leyte in the Philippine Islands in support of U.S. troops occupying the Philippines. After escorting a convoy to Lingayen Gulf at Luzon in the Philippines, she departed from Leyte on 8 March 1945 for Seattle, Washington.

Following overhaul, Machias proceeded to Kodiak in the Territory of Alaska. Earmarked for transfer to the Soviet Navy in Project Hula, a secret program for the transfer of U.S. Navy ships to the Soviet Navy in anticipation of the Soviet Union joining the war against Japan, Sandusky joined her sister ships USS Charlottesville (PF-25), USS Long Beach (PF-34), USS Belfast (PF-35), USS Glendale (PF-36), USS San Pedro (PF-37), USS Coronado (PF-38), USS Allentown (PF-52), and USS Machias (PF-53) in getting underway from Kodiak on 13 June 1945 bound for Cold Bay, Alaska, where they arrived on 14 June 1945 to enter Project Hula. Training of Sanduksy's new Soviet Navy crew soon began at Cold Bay.

=== Soviet Navy, 1945–1949 ===
Sandusky was decommissioned on 12 July 1945 at Cold Bay and transferred to the Soviet Union under Lend-Lease immediately along with nine of her sister ships, the first group of patrol frigates transferred to the Soviet Navy. Commissioned into the Soviet Navy immediately, Sandusky was designated as a storozhevoi korabl ("escort ship") and renamed EK-7 in Soviet service. On 15 July 1945, EK-7 departed Cold Bay in company with nine of her sister ships – EK-1 (ex-Charlottesville), EK-2 (ex-Long Beach), EK-3 (ex-Belfast), EK-4 (ex-Machias), EK-5 (ex-San Pedro), EK-6 (ex-Glendale), EK-8 (ex-Coronado), EK-9 (ex-Allentown), and EK-10 (ex-USS Ogden (PF-39)) – bound for Petropavlovsk-Kamchatsky in the Soviet Union. EK-7 served as a patrol vessel in the Soviet Far East.

In February 1946, the United States began negotiations for the return of ships loaned to the Soviet Union for use during World War II. On 8 May 1947, United States Secretary of the Navy James V. Forrestal informed the United States Department of State that the United States Department of the Navy wanted 480 of the 585 combatant ships it had transferred to the Soviet Union for World War II use returned, EK-7 among them. Negotiations for the return of the ships were protracted, but on 15 October 1949 the Soviet Union finally returned EK-7 to the U.S. Navy at Yokosuka, Japan.

=== Japan Maritime Self-Defense Force, 1953–1970 ===
Reverting to her original name, Sandusky lay idle in the Pacific Reserve Fleet at Yokosuka until the United States loaned her to Japan on 26 February 1953 for service in the Japan Maritime Self-Defense Force as JDS Nire (PF-7) (にれ (PF-7); "elm"). Nire was redesignated PF-287 on 1 September 1957. The United States struck her from the Navy list on 1 December 1961 and transferred her outright to Japan on 28 August 1962. In 1969, she was reclassified as an "auxiliary stock craft" (YAC) and renamed YAC-19. Japan returned her to the United States on 31 March 1970 for disposal.

== Awards ==
The U.S. Navy awarded Sandusky two battle stars for her World War II service.
