= USS Clarion =

Cargo ship of the United States Navy

History

United States
- Name: Clarion
- Namesake: Clarion County, Pennsylvania
- Ordered: as type (C1-M-AV1) hull, MC hull 2145
- Builder: Froemming Brothers, Inc., Milwaukee, Wisconsin
- Yard number: 17
- Laid down: 1944
- Launched: 22 October 1944
- Sponsored by: Miss V. L. Huebner
- Acquired: 10 May 1945
- Commissioned: 27 May 1945
- Decommissioned: 13 May 1946
- Stricken: 21 May 1946
- Identification: Hull symbol: AK-172; Code letters: NEIN
- Fate: Sold to Norway, 7 March 1947, for $693,862.00

Norway
- Name: Livdal
- Acquired: 7 March 1947
- Fate: Wrecked off Peru, 26 April 1970

General characteristics
- Class & type: Alamosa-class cargo ship
- Type: C1-M-AV1
- Tonnage: 5,032 long tons deadweight (DWT)
- Displacement: 2,382 long tons (2,420 t) (standard); 7,450 long tons (7,570 t) (full load)
- Length: 388 ft 8 in (118.47 m)
- Beam: 50 ft (15 m)
- Draft: 21 ft 1 in (6.43 m)
- Installed power: 1 × Nordberg, TSM 6 diesel engine; 1,750 shp (1,300 kW)
- Propulsion: 1 × propeller
- Speed: 11.5 kn (21.3 km/h; 13.2 mph)
- Capacity: 3,945 t (3,883 long tons) DWT; 9,830 cu ft (278 m^{3}) (refrigerated); 227,730 cu ft (6,449 m^{3}) (non-refrigerated)
- Complement: 15 Officers; 70 Enlisted
- Armament: 1 × 3 in (76 mm)/50-caliber dual-purpose gun (DP); 6 × 20 mm (0.8 in) Oerlikon anti-aircraft (AA) cannons

USS Clarion (AK-172) was an Alamosa-class cargo ship commissioned by the U.S. Navy for service in World War II. She was responsible for delivering troops, goods and equipment to locations in the war zone.

== Construction ==
Clarion was launched 22 October 1944, by Froemming Brothers, Inc., Milwaukee, Wisconsin, under a Maritime Commission contract, MC hull 2145; acquired by the Navy 10 May 1945; and commissioned 27 May 1945.

== Service history ==
=== World War II Pacific Theatre operations ===
After loading cargo at Gulf of Mexico ports, Clarion sailed for Pearl Harbor, which she reached 21 July 1945. Three days later she got underway for San Francisco, California, to load cargo for Manila, where she arrived 1 October. Carrying cargo to support occupation activities, she called at Jinsen, Korea, and Qingdao, Taku, and Shanghai, China, before sailing for the U.S. East Coast from Qingdao 21 January 1946.

=== Post-war decommissioning ===
She reached Norfolk 11 March, and was decommissioned at Baltimore, Maryland, 13 May 1946. On 18 May 1946, she was transferred to the War Shipping Administration.

== Merchant service ==
Clarion was removed by Dichman, Wright and Pugh, 25 February 1947, from the Reserve Fleet, under a GAA contract. It was sold to Norway, 7 March 1947, for $693,862, then re-flagged for Norway and renamed Livdal, or Løvdal. She wrecked off of the coast of Peru, 26 April 1970.

== Bibliography ==
- "Clarion (AK-172)". Dictionary of American Naval Fighting Ships. Naval History and Heritage Command. 10 June 2015. This article incorporates text from this source, which is in the public domain.
- "C1 Cargo Ships". www.ShipbuildingHistory.com. 28 August 2009.
- "USS Clarion (AK-172)". NavSource. 18 July 2014.
- "Clarion". United States Department of Transportation. Archived from the original on November 5, 2016.
