= USS Chatham (AK-169) =

Cargo ship of the United States Navy

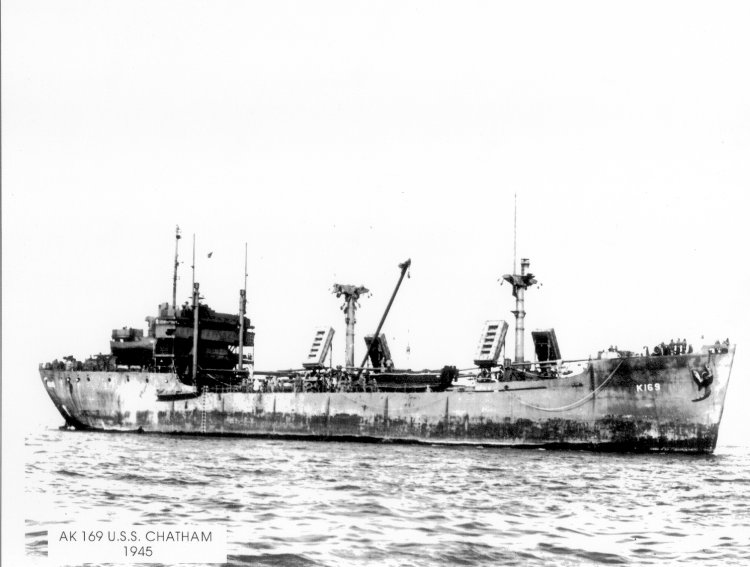
- USS Chatham (AK-169), departing an island port in the Pacific, c. mid-1945.

History

United States
- Name: Chatham
- Namesake: Chatham County, Georgia, and; Chatham County, North Carolina
- Ordered: as type (C1-M-AV1) hull, MC hull 2142
- Builder: Froemming Brothers, Inc., Milwaukee, Wisconsin
- Yard number: 14
- Laid down: date unknown
- Launched: 13 May 1944
- Sponsored by: Mrs. G. C. Salisbury
- Acquired: 20 January 1945
- Commissioned: 22 February 1945
- Decommissioned: 2 April 1946
- Stricken: 17 April 1946
- Identification: Hull symbol: AK-169; Code letters: NEGW
- Fate: Removed from the Reserve Fleet, 28 February 1947, under GAA contract by Dickman, Wright and Pugh

History

Netherlands
- Name: Helena
- Owner: Koninklijke Nederlandsche Stoomboot Mattschappij N.V.
- Acquired: 15 April 1947
- Fate: Sold 1963

History

Panama
- Name: Lincoln Express
- Owner: Bahamas Lines, Panama
- Acquired: 1963
- Fate: broke in two and sank in December 1972

General characteristics
- Class & type: Alamosa-class cargo ship
- Type: C1-M-AV1
- Tonnage: 5,032 long tons deadweight (DWT)
- Displacement: 2,382 long tons (2,420 t) (standard); 7,450 long tons (7,570 t) (full load)
- Length: 388 ft 8 in (118.47 m)
- Beam: 50 ft (15 m)
- Draft: 21 ft 1 in (6.43 m)
- Installed power: 1 × Nordberg, TSM 6 diesel engine; 1,750 shp (1,300 kW)
- Propulsion: 1 × propeller
- Speed: 11.5 kn (21.3 km/h; 13.2 mph)
- Capacity: 3,945 t (3,883 long tons) DWT; 9,830 cu ft (278 m^{3}) (refrigerated); 227,730 cu ft (6,449 m^{3}) (non-refrigerated)
- Complement: 15 Officers; 70 Enlisted
- Armament: 1 × 3 in (76 mm)/50 caliber dual purpose gun (DP); 6 × 20 mm (0.8 in) Oerlikon anti-aircraft (AA) cannons

USS Chatham (AK-169) was an Alamosa-class cargo ship commissioned by the U.S. Navy for service in World War II. She was responsible for delivering troops, goods and equipment to locations in the war zone.

== Construction ==
The third Chatham commissioned by the Navy, was launched 13 May 1944 by Froemming Brothers, Inc., Milwaukee, Wisconsin, under a Maritime Commission contract, MC hull 2142; sponsored by Mrs. G. C. Salisbury; acquired by the Navy 20 January 1945; and commissioned at Galveston, Texas, 22 February 1945.

== Service history ==
=== World War II Pacific Theatre operations ===
Chatham arrived at Pearl Harbor 6 May 1945 to carry cargo to Eniwetok, Saipan, and Guam, before returning to San Francisco, 18 July for a brief overhaul. She cleared San Francisco 13 August, and until 30 January 1946, when she returned to San Francisco once more, carried cargo from Okinawa to Guam, Manus, Saipan, Eniwetok, and the Philippines, aiding in the redeployment of American strength in the Pacific Ocean which followed the war.

=== Post-war decommissioning ===
From the US West Coast, she sailed to Baltimore, Maryland, where she was decommissioned 2 April 1946 and returned to the Maritime Commission, 4 April 1946.

== Merchant service ==
Chatham was acquired by the Koninklijke Nederlandsche Stoomboot Mattschappij, N.V. of Amsterdam, Holland, and renamed Helena, the former Navy cargo ship operated out of Amsterdam, under the Dutch flag, from 1949 to 1963.

She was sold in 1963 to the Bahamas Line, Panama, and renamed Lincoln Express. She broke in two and sank 15 December 1972, in heavy weather West of San Juan, Puerto Rico, with a load of Gypsum. All but one of her crew were rescued by the USCG buoy tender Sagebrush.

== Military awards and honors ==
The record does not indicate any battle stars for Chatham. However, her crew was eligible for the following medals:

- American Campaign Medal
- Asiatic–Pacific Campaign Medal
- World War II Victory Medal
- Navy Occupation Service Medal (with Asia clasp)

== Notes ==
Citations

== Bibliography ==
Online resources

- "Chatham III (AK-169)". Dictionary of American Naval Fighting Ships. Naval History and Heritage Command. 30 June 2015. This article incorporates text from this source, which is in the public domain.
- "C1 Cargo Ships". ShipbuildingHistory.com. 28 August 2009.
- "USS Chatham (AK-169)". NavSource. 18 July 2014.
- "Sagebrush, 1944". United States Coast Guard. 15 September 2016.
- Swiggum, S.; Kohli, M. (10 June 2006). "Koninklijke Nederlandsche Stoomboot Maatschappij, Amsterdam / Royal Netherlands Steamship Co". TheShipsList.
