= USS Charlevoix =

Cargo ship of the United States Navy

History

United States
- Name: Charlevoix
- Namesake: Charlevoix County, Michigan
- Ordered: as type (C1-M-AV1) hull, MC hull 2141
- Builder: Froemming Brothers, Inc., Milwaukee, Wisconsin
- Yard number: 13
- Laid down: date unknown
- Launched: 20 April 1944
- Sponsored by: Mrs. E. Buchanan
- Commissioned: 1 February 1945
- Decommissioned: 18 January 1946
- Stricken: 17 April 1946
- Identification: Hull symbol: AK-168; Code letters: NEGU
- Fate: Sold, 7 February 1947, D/S A/S Imica

Norway
- Name: Benny (1947–1959, 1963); Benny Viking (1959–1963); Stella Oceanica (1963–1965)
- Acquired: 26 February 1947
- Fate: Sold 1965

Panama
- Name: Jasolinan
- Acquired: 1965
- Fate: Sold 1965

Panama
- Name: Paraskevi
- Acquired: 1965
- Fate: Scrapped in Spain in 1970

General characteristics
- Class & type: Alamosa-class cargo ship
- Type: C1-M-AV1
- Tonnage: 5,032 long tons deadweight (DWT)
- Displacement: 2,382 long tons (2,420 t) (standard); 7,450 long tons (7,570 t) (full load)
- Length: 388 ft 8 in (118.47 m)
- Beam: 50 ft (15 m)
- Draft: 21 ft 1 in (6.43 m)
- Installed power: 1 × Nordberg, TSM 6 diesel engine; 1,750 shp (1,300 kW)
- Propulsion: 1 × propeller
- Speed: 11.5 kn (21.3 km/h; 13.2 mph)
- Capacity: 3,945 t (3,883 long tons) DWT; 9,830 cu ft (278 m^{3}) (refrigerated); 227,730 cu ft (6,449 m^{3}) (non-refrigerated)
- Complement: 15 Officers; 70 Enlisted
- Armament: 1 × 3 in (76 mm)/50 caliber dual purpose gun (DP); 6 × 20 mm (0.8 in) Oerlikon anti-aircraft (AA) cannons

USS Charlevoix (AK-168) was an Alamosa-class cargo ship commissioned by the U.S. Navy for service in World War II. She was responsible for delivering troops, goods and equipment to locations in the war zone.

== Construction ==
Charlevoix, was launched 20 April 1944. by Froemming Brothers, Inc., Milwaukee, Wisconsin, under a Maritime Commission contract, MC hull 2141; sponsored by Mrs. E. Buchanan; and commissioned 1 February 1945.

== Service history ==
=== World War II Pacific Theatre operations ===
Charlevoix, cargo laden, cleared Gulfport, Mississippi, 24 February 1945 for Manus, arriving 5 April. Here she was assigned to a convoy bound for the Philippines, and after a passage marked by one possible submarine contact depth charged by the convoy's escorts, reached Subic Bay 24 April to discharge her cargo. Returning to Manus 1 June, she quickly reloaded, and took departure 7 June, for Samar, Philippine Islands, where she unloaded on 28 June, returning to Manus 5 July.

Next underway 11 July 1945, Charlevoix loaded aviation gas at Lae for the New Zealand Air Force based on New Britain. She delivered her flammable cargo safely 20 July, supporting our Allies in their twice-daily raids on the Japanese at by-passed Rabaul. She made one more voyage from Manus, to deliver cargo to Hollandia, returning with rolling stock for repair at Manus in August, then sailed north to Samar and Subic Bay, where she was briefly overhauled in October.

=== Post-war decommissioning ===
She then proceeded to Norfolk, Virginia, which she reached 23 December, decommissioned there 18 January 1946, and was returned to the Maritime Commission 25 January 1946.

== Merchant service ==
Charlevoix was purchased for a Norwegian shipper 7 February 1947, by D/S A/S Imica. She was transferred 26 February 1947 and renamed Benny. In 1959 her name was changed to Benny Viking before changing back to Benny and then Stella Oceanica in 1963.

In 1965 she was sold and reflagged in Panama, being renamed Jasolinan. However, she was sold later that year and this time renamed Paraskevi.

She was finally scrapped in Spain in 1970.

== Notes ==
Citations

== Bibliography ==
Online resources

- "charlevoix". Dictionary of American Naval Fighting Ships. Naval History and Heritage Command. 14 February 1999. This article incorporates text from this source, which is in the public domain.
- "C1 Cargo Ships". www.ShipbuildingHistory.com. 28 August 2009.
- "USS Charlevoix (AK-168)". NavSource. 5 April 2015.
