= Froemming Brothers =

Milwaukee, Wisconsin American shipyard company

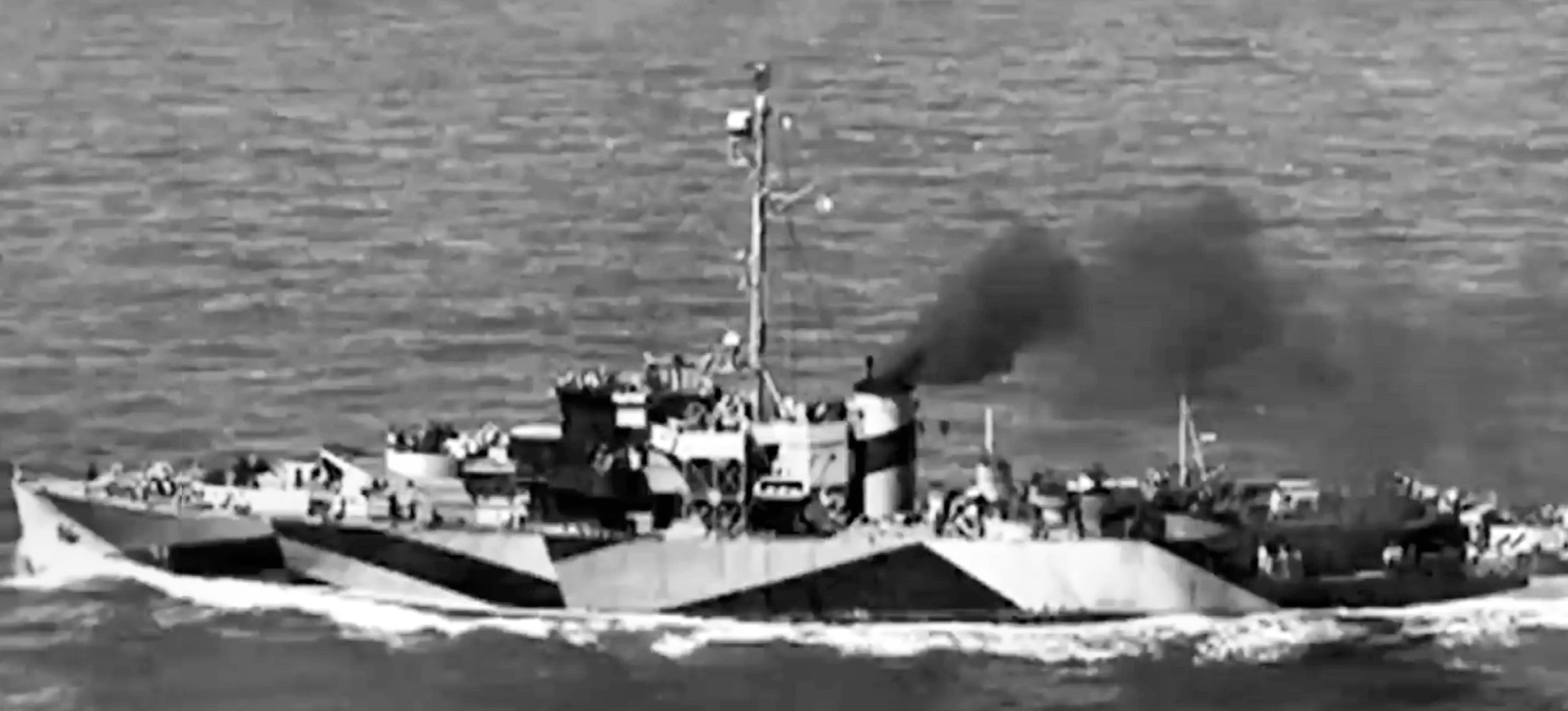
USS Allentown (PF-52) built at Froemming Brothers, underway in the Atlantic Ocean off Hampton Roads, Virginia, on 9 August 1944. She is painted in Measure 32/16D dazzle camouflage.

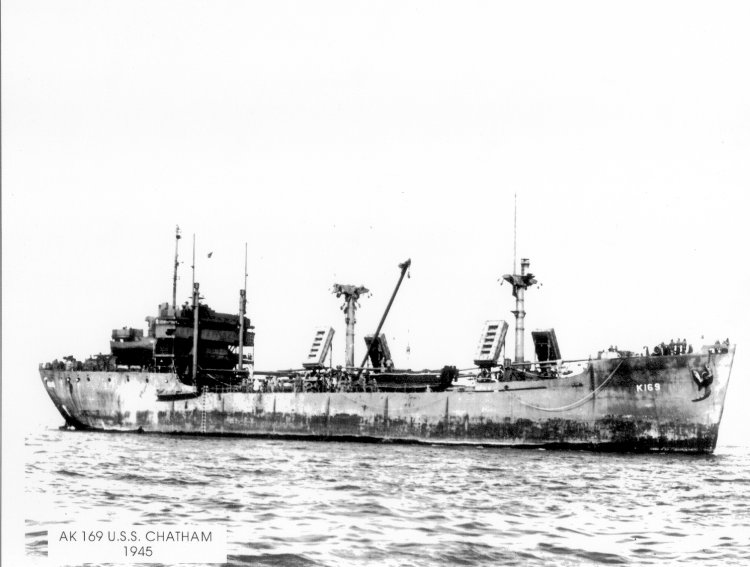
USS Chatham (AK-169), built at Froemming Brothers, departing an island port in the Pacific, in 1945.

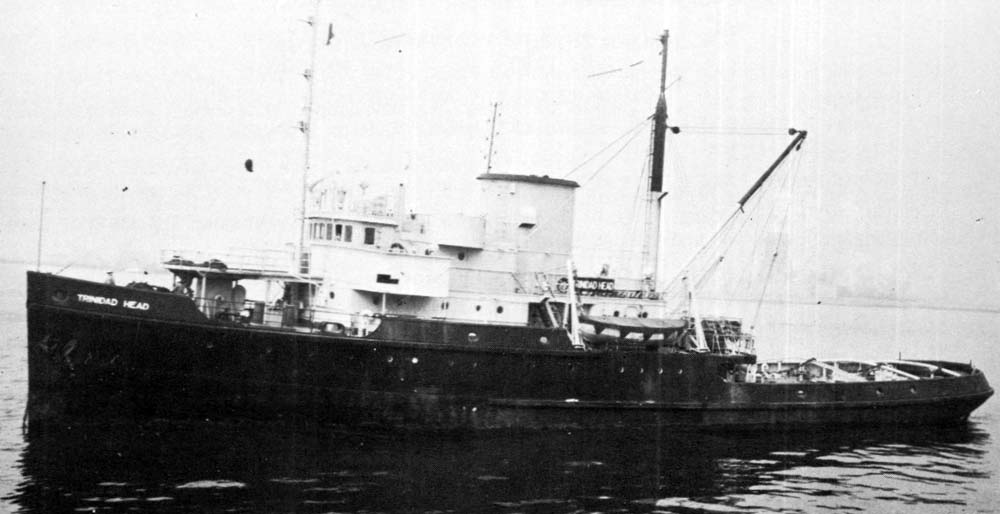
A V4-M-A1 tug, in New York July 1943

Froemming Brothers of Milwaukee, Wisconsin was a shipyard that built ships for World War II under the emergency shipbuilding program, War Shipping Administration and United States Navy. Froemming Brothers shipyard was opened in 1942 by Ben Froemming (1902-1945). Froemming Brothers closed after the war in 1945, after building 26 ships. The shipyard was located on the north side of the Kinnickinnic River. The shipyard had 2,400 workers in three shifts. In 1945 it was sold to Wagner Iron Works and later sold to the Milwaukee Marine Yacht. The site today is Horny Goat Marina, Blue Max Charters and Clete Long Enterprises. The shipyard was in Bay View, Milwaukee neighborhood at 43.008597°N 87.911697°W.

== Legacy ==
Ben Froemming died in 1945 near the end of the war. The last ship built at the yard had its name changed before the christening. The SS Tapir Splice a C1-M-AV1 Cargo ship was renamed the SS Ben Froemming and delivered to the War Shipping Administration in October 1945. After the war in 1947, the Ben Froemming was sold to a private company. In 1975 she was converted to the drillship SS Goldrill.

== Ships built ==
Froemming Brothers for World War II:

- V4-M-A1 Type V ship Tugboats, at a cost of $1.2 million each.
- S2-S2-AQ1, Tacoma-class frigate,
- C1-M-AV1 Type C1 ships Cargo ships

- Tacoma-class frigate 4 built:
- USS Allentown
- USS Sandusky (PF-54)
- USS Bath (PF-55)
- USS Machias (PF-53)

- Type V ship - tug boat, V4-M-A1 8 built
- Point Loma Scrapped 1972
- Anacapa Scrapped 1973
- Point Vicente To Mexico 1969 renamed Huitilopochtli (A 51)
- Point Arguello Scrapped 1973
- Sankaty Head Helped with Normandy landings, Scrapped 1978
- Yaqina Head Sold private 1971, scrapped
- Bald Island Scrapped 1973
- Fire Island Scrapped 1972

- C1 Ships, C1-M-AV1 Cargo ships, 14 built:
- USS Chatham (AK-169)
- USS Craighead (AK-175)
- USS Claiborne (AK-171)
- USS Chicot (AK-170)
- USS Colquitt (AK-174)
- USS Clarion (AK-172)
- USS Charlevoix (AK-168)
- Doddridge, renamed Coastal Messenger, then USCGC Courier
- Codington
- Duval, renamed Coastal Racer, then YFP-10
- Knob Knot
- Salmon Knot
- Yard Hitch
- Tapir Splice, renamed Ben Froemming, then Golddrill 5

== See also ==
- Walter Butler Shipbuilders
