= Woman's Bay =

Bay in the south of Barbados

- Location within Barbados
- Coordinates: 13.0478°N 59.5150°W
- Country: Barbados
- Parish: Christ Church

Woman's Bay, also known as Women's Bay and Silver Sands, is located in Christ Church Parish in the south of the island of Barbados, close to the settlements of Inch Marlowe and Hopewell. It lies 1,500 metres (0.93 mi) to the east of the nation's southernmost point, South Point and 15 kilometres (9.3 mi) southeast of the capital, Bridgetown.

In 2002, an international loan for $US 17 million was approved to the Barbadian Government with the Inter-American Development Bank, for use in stabilising and upgrading the shore and facilities at Woman's Bay and several other local beaches.

Woman's Bay is a popular fishing spot, especially for Yellowfin tuna, Atlantic white marlin, and Great barracuda.
