= Womens Bay, Alaska =

- Census-designated place
- Location in Alaska
- Coordinates: 57°42′6″N 152°34′20″W
- Country: United States
- State: Alaska
- Borough: Kodiak Island

Government
  - Borough mayor: Jerrol Friend
  - State senator: Gary Stevens (R)
  - State rep.: Louise Stutes (R)

Area
  - Total: 44.04 sq mi (114.07 km^{2})
  - Land: 43.92 sq mi (113.76 km^{2})
  - Water: 0.12 sq mi (0.31 km^{2})
- Elevation: 1,093 ft (333 m)

Population (2020)
  - Total: 743
  - Density: 16.9/sq mi (6.53/km^{2})
- Time zone: UTC-9 (Alaska (AKST))
  - Summer (DST): UTC-8 (AKDT)
- ZIP code: 99615
- Area code: 907
- FIPS code: 02-85680
- GNIS feature ID: 1866977

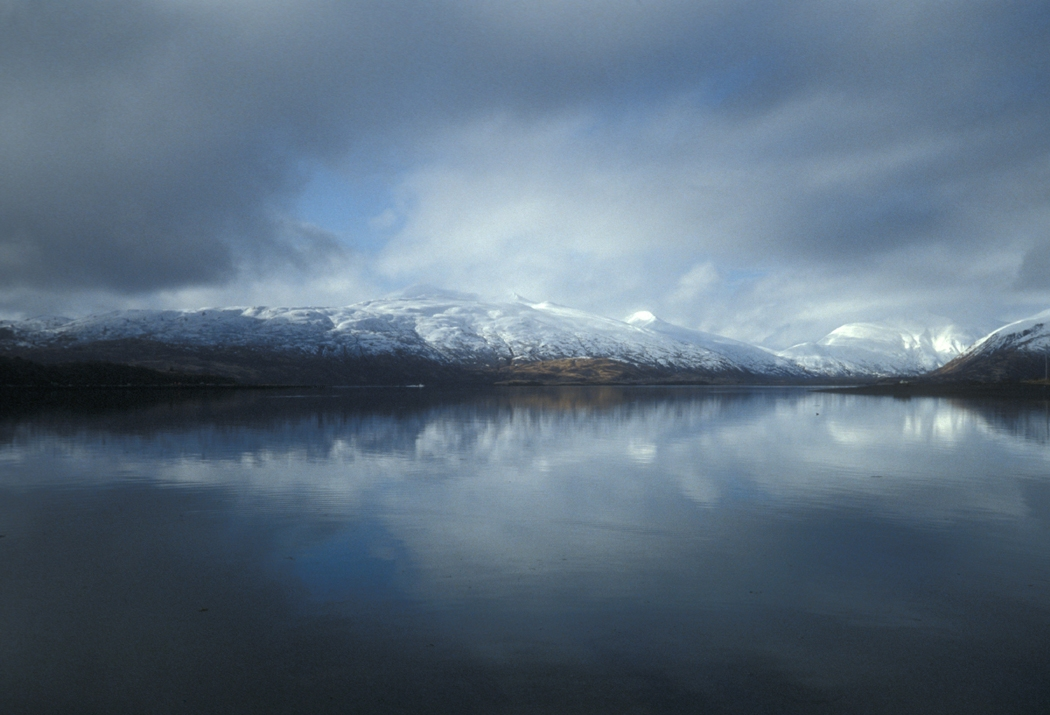
Womens Bay, Alaska

Womens Bay, also known as Bells Flats is a census-designated place (CDP) in Kodiak Island Borough, Alaska, United States. At the 2020 census the population was 743, up from 719 in 2010. The name is correctly spelled "Womens", without an apostrophe.

== Geography ==
Womens Bay is located at 57°42′06″N 152°34′20″W.

According to the United States Census Bureau, the CDP has a total area of 44.0 square miles (114.0 km^{2}), of which 43.9 square miles (113.7 km^{2}) is land and 0.12 square miles (0.3 km^{2}), or 0.28%, is water.

== Demographics ==
Historical population
Census	Pop.	Note	%±
1990	620		—
2000	690		11.3%
2010	719		4.2%
2020	743		3.3%
U.S. Decennial Census

Womens Bay first appeared on the 1990 U.S. Census as a census-designated place (CDP).

As of the census of 2000, there were 690 people, 251 households, and 175 families residing in the CDP. The population density was 15.8 inhabitants per square mile (6.1/km^{2}). There were 269 housing units at an average density of 6.2 per square mile (2.4/km^{2}). The racial makeup of the CDP was 85.80% White, 0.58% Black or African American, 6.09% Native American, 1.45% Asian, and 6.09% from two or more races. 1.74% of the population were Hispanic or Latino of any race.

There were 251 households, out of which 40.2% had children under the age of 18 living with them, 57.4% were married couples living together, 8.8% had a female householder with no husband present, and 29.9% were non-families. 23.9% of all households were made up of individuals, and 1.6% had someone living alone who was 65 years of age or older. The average household size was 2.75 and the average family size was 3.28.

In the CDP, the population was spread out, with 30.7% under the age of 18, 6.8% from 18 to 24, 36.1% from 25 to 44, 24.2% from 45 to 64, and 2.2% who were 65 years of age or older. The median age was 35 years. For every 100 females, there were 113.0 males. For every 100 females age 18 and over, there were 116.3 males.

The median income for a household in the CDP was $72,083, and the median income for a family was $71,250. Males had a median income of $49,792 versus $40,605 for females. The per capita income for the CDP was $27,746. None of the population was living below the poverty line.
