= Walter Butler Shipbuilders Inc. =

Shipyard in Superior, Wisconsin, United States

Coordinates: 46.706244°N 92.043896°W

Map of Superior port on western Lake Superior

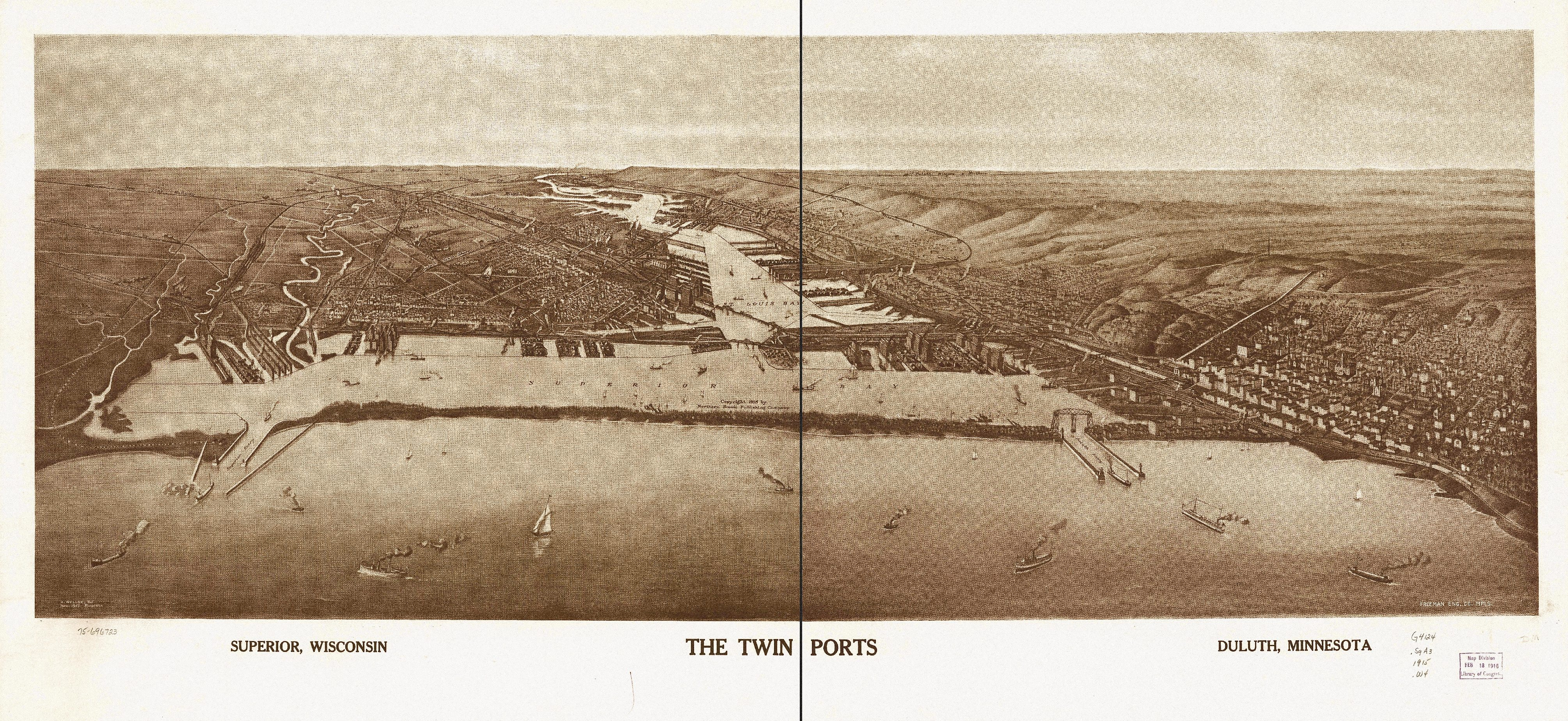
1915 Panoramic map of the Twin Ports, Superior on the left and Duluth on the right, by Henry Wellge

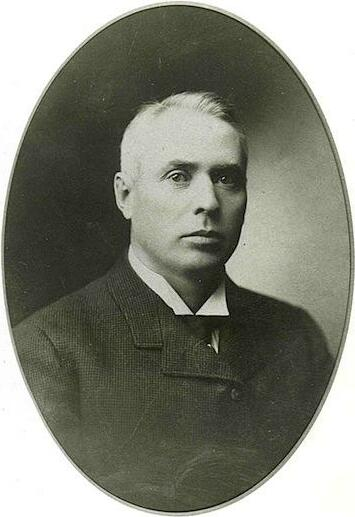
Walter Butler (1858-1933), first president of the Butler Brothers Construction Company. Owner of Walter Butler Shipbuilders Inc.

Walter Butler Shipbuilders Inc. was a large-scale World War II ship manufacturing shipyard, located at Superior, Wisconsin, United States. Walter Butler purchased the shipyard from Lake Superior Shipbuilding in 1942. Walter Butler Shipbuilders Inc. was at E 1st St, Superior, Wisconsin. The shipyard was located on the western part of Lake Superior. Walter Butler Shipbuilders Inc. was found by Walter Butler in 1942 to build ships for World War II. Walter Butler Shipbuilders Inc., the McDougall Duluth Shipbuilding Company and the Superior Shipbuilding Company (now Fraser Shipyards) were called the Twin Ports shipbuilding industry of Minnesota and Wisconsin. Once built the ships can travel to the Atlantic Ocean through the Great Lakes and the Saint Lawrence Seaway.

To expand operations and built more ships the Emergency Shipbuilding Program, Walter Butler purchased the Barnes-Duluth Shipbuilding at 110 Spring Street, Duluth, Minnesota, now the site of the West Duluth's Spirit Lake Marina. The Duluth shipyard was located on St. Louis River Estuary 6 miles west of the Superior shipyard. The shipyard was called Walter Butler Shipbuilders-Duluth. At the Duluth shipyards built were C1-M type ships. The Superior and Duluth shipyards closed in August 1945, as all war contacts ended and there was a surplus of ships at the end of the war. In 1950 the Superior shipyard site became the Enbridge Ogdensburg Pier that serves the inland Enbridge's Superior Terminal.

== Butler Brothers ==
Walter Butler shipbuilding was a family company started in 1877 as the Butler Brothers Shipbuilders, then later called Walter Butler Shipbuilders Inc. The brother pass the yard to Robert Butler (1897-1955). After the war Robert Butler was appointed US Ambassador to Australia by President Truman in 1946. The Butler Brothers started as an iron ore mining company in Cooley and Nashwauk, Minnesota in the 1920s and 1930s. Butler Brothers sold the company to the Hanna Mining Company. The Butler Brothers were: Walter (1858-1933), Pierce (1866–1939), Emmett (1870-1870), Cooley (1868-1965), John (1876-1926), Willian (1864-1916). They start as the group that ran the 'Butler Brothers Construction Company. Pierce Butler was the legal counsel for the Butler Brothers construction company. The Butler Brothers father was Patrick Butler (1824 - 1900) born in Dublin, Ireland and came to America when he was 20. Patrick married Mary Ann Gaffney on February 11, 1850, in Galena, Illinois. They came to Minnesota in 1856.

Walter Butler was born in Lakeville, Minnesota on July 6, 1858. Walter went to Carleton College in Northfield, Minnesota. In 1880 he became a bricklayer and moved to Saint Paul, Minnesota. His brothers also moved to Saint Paul and stated Butler Brothers Construction partnership in 1887. Butler Brothers Construction first large contract was building Macalester College in Saint Paul. Next large contract was in 1904 to build Grand Central Terminal in New York City. Other projects included working on the House wing of the North Dakota State Capitol (1903) and Detroit River Tunnel (1906-1910). In 1884 Walter Butler married Rose Sweeny, they had five children, Rose died in 1901, Walter remarried in October 1902 to Helen Wood. Walter Butler died on October 28, 1933, at the age of 75.

== Walter Butler Superior shipyard ==
Walter Butler Shipbuilders Inc. Superior shipyard built ships under the Emergency Shipbuilding Program:

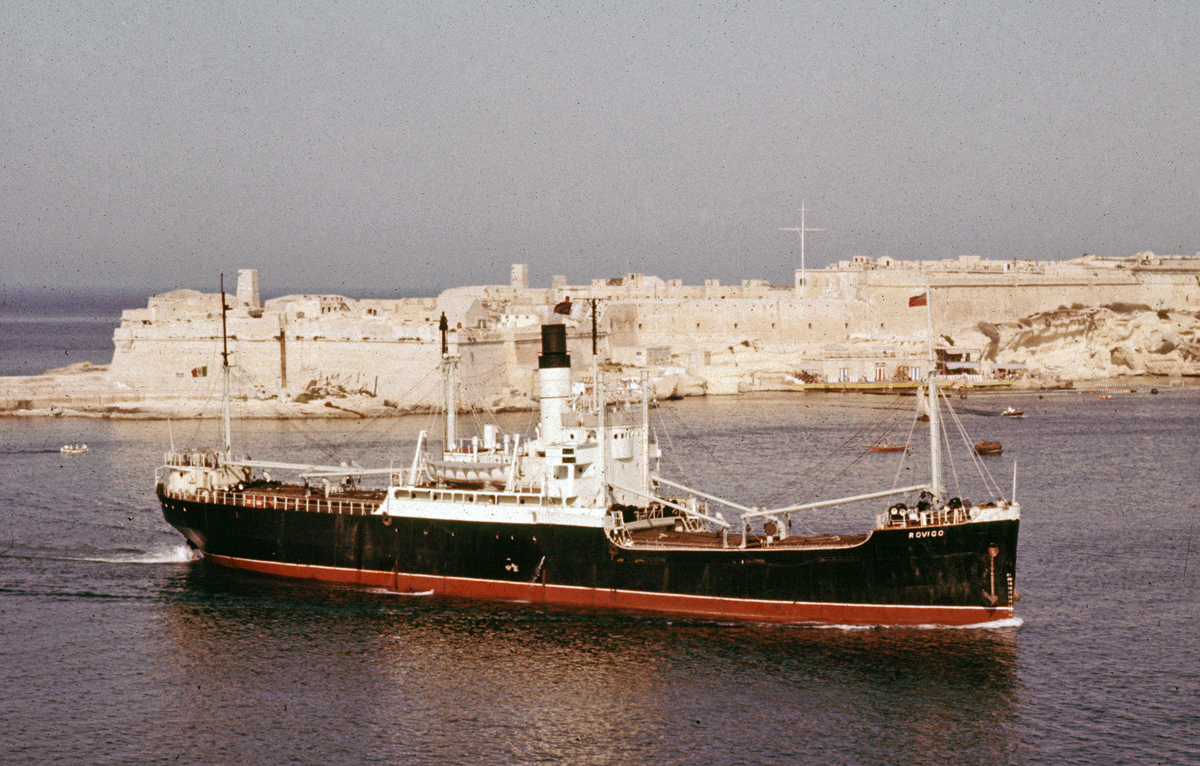
N3-S-A1 a type N3 ship

N3-S-A1: Type N3 ship, 2,905 DWT cargo ship, length: 258 feet (78.87 m), most sent to Britain, built in 1943:

- John W. Arey Hull # 1 Ship ID 169573 (sank 1971)
- Rodney Baxter Hull # 2 Ship ID 169619 (sank 1972 and again in 1974 )
- Richard Bearse Hull # 3 Ship ID 169608
- William Brewster Hull # 4 Ship ID 169922
- William Bursley Hull # 5 Ship ID 169577 (mined 1945, collision 1954, wrecked 1964)
- Ashman J. Clough Hull # 6 Ship ID 169602 (torpedoed sank 1944)
- Calvin Coggin Hull # 7 Ship ID 169600
- Jesse G. Cotting Hull # 8 Ship ID 169613
- Josiah P. Cressey Hull # 9 Ship ID 169596 (sank 1949)
- Tully Crosby Hull # 10 Ship ID 169601 (sank 1965)
- Elkanah Crowell Hull # 11 Ship ID 169612
- Justin Doane Hull # 12 Ship ID 169618 (sank 1950)
- Asa Eldridge Hull # 13 Ship ID 169711
- Anthony Enright Hull # 14 Ship ID 169607
- Watson Ferris Hull # 15 Ship ID 169713
- Bailey Foster Hull # 16 Ship ID 169675
- Gurden Gates Hull # 17 Ship ID 169665 (burnt abandoned 1967)

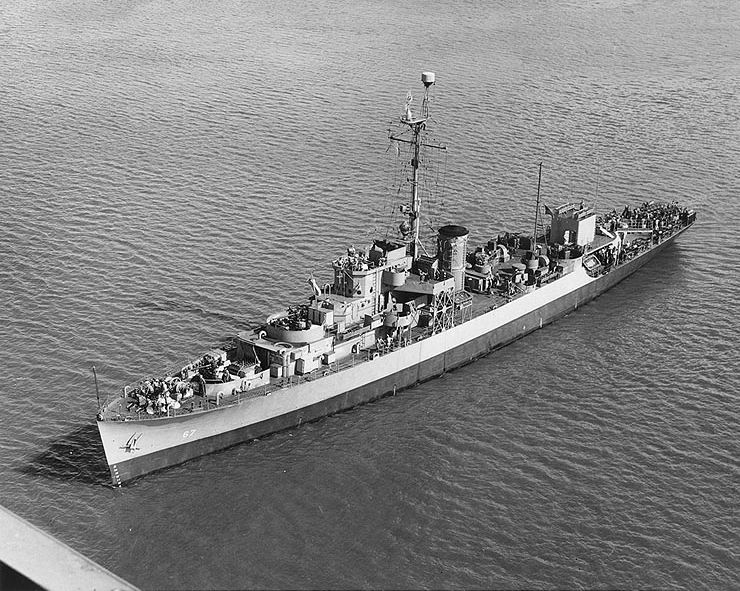
Tacoma-class frigate

S2-S2-AQ1 Tacoma-class frigate, length 303 feet, built in 1944:

- Moses Gay Hull # 18 Ship ID 169727
- Gloucester Hull # 19 Ship ID PF 22
- Shreveport Hull # 20 Ship ID PF 23
- Muskegon Hull # 21 Ship ID PF 24
- Charlottesville Hull # 22 Ship ID PF 25
- Poughkeepsie Hull # 23 Ship ID PF 26
- Newport Hull # 24 Ship ID PF 27
- Emporia Hull # 25 Ship ID PF 28
- Groton Hull # 26 Ship ID PF 29
- Hingham Hull # 27 Ship ID PF 30
- Grand Rapids Hull # 28 Ship ID PF 31
- Woonsocket Hull # 29 Ship ID PF 32
- Dearborn Hull # 30 Ship ID PF 33

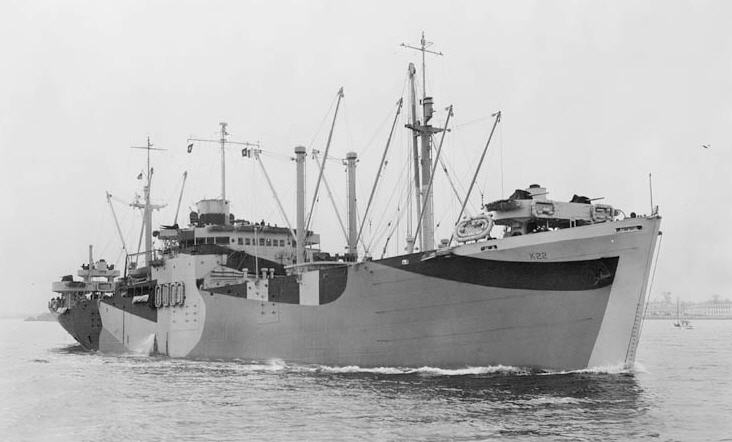
Cargo ship type C1 ship

C1-M-AV1 Cargo ship type C1, length 338 feet, 5,032 DWT, with one large diesel engine, built in 1944 and 1945:

- Gadsden Hull # 31 Ship ID AK 182
- Glacier Hull # 32 Ship ID AK 183
- Grainger Hull # 33 Ship ID AK 184
- Gwinnett Hull # 34 Ship ID AK 185
- Habersham Hull # 35 Ship ID AK 186
- Hennepin Hull # 36 Ship ID AK 187
- Herkimer Hull # 37 Ship ID AK 188
- Hidalgo Hull # 38 Ship ID AK 189
- Kenosha Hull # 39 Ship ID AK 190
- Coastal Archer Hull # 40 Ship ID 248952
- Coastal Expounder Hull # 41 Ship ID 248954
- Coastal Ringleader / Lancaster Hull # 42 Ship ID 248957
- Coastal Spartan Hull # 43 Ship ID 248959
- Coastal Harbinger Hull # 44 Ship ID 248955
- Coastal Herald Hull # 45 Ship ID 248683
- Phoebe Knot Hull # 46 Ship ID 248059
- Chain and Crown Hull # 47 Ship ID 248117
- Cinch Knot Hull # 48 Ship ID 247893
- Hawser Eye Hull # 49 Ship ID 248168
- Dragon Fly Hull # 50 Ship ID 248356
- Sampan Hitch Hull # 51 Ship ID 248570
- Jacob's Ladder Hull # 52 Ship ID 248566

== Lake Superior Shipbuilding ==
Lake Superior Shipbuilding built two ships before being purchased by Walter Butler Shipbuilders Inc. The two ship were

- SS Bullwheel (YO 46)a US Navy Oiler Hull # 101, 1,731 tons, delivered on October 21, 1942, sold to Philippine company in 1964.
- SS Casinghead (YO 47) a US Navy Oiler Hull # 102, 1,731 tons, delivered on November 12, 1942, Struck 1997

== Globe Shipbuilding Company ==
Globe Shipbuilding Company operated in Superior, Wisconsin during World War I and World War II. During World War II, Walter Butler Shipbuilders utilized the Globe yard facilities under federal contract as part of the Emergency Shipbuilding Program. For a detailed history during World War I and World War II, community involvement, and documentary and legacy, see the main article.

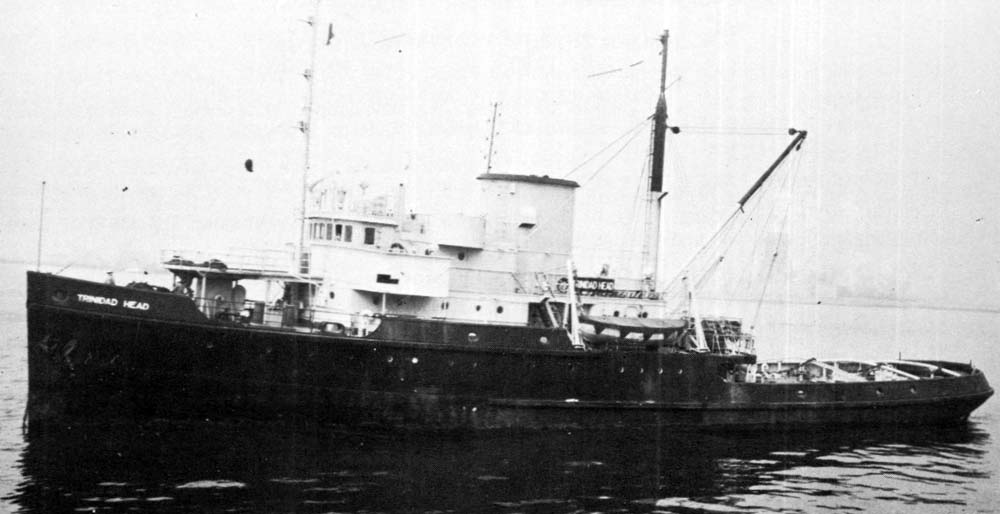
A V4-M-A1 tug, in New York July 1943

During World War II Walter Butler Shipbuilders took over the Globe Shipbuilding shipyard in Superior, Wisconsin, near the current Fraser Shipyards, to build ships under the Emergency Shipbuilding Program. Globe Shipbuilding Company built ships for World War I, but in a different shipyard. During World War II Globe employed 2,500 workers, 10% were female, their president was Clarence Skamser. The Globe had a baseball team that played other shipyards, including Marine Ironworks & Shipbuilding and Zenith Dredge.

Ships built at Walter Butler Shipbuilders' Globe Shipbuilding shipyard:

V4-M-A1 Type V ship seaworthy tugs, 186-foot long with a steel hull:

- Point Sur
- Farallon
- Point Cabrillo
- Trinidad Head
- Scotch Cap
- Watch Hill
- Wood Island
- Sands Point
- Point Judith
- Black Rock

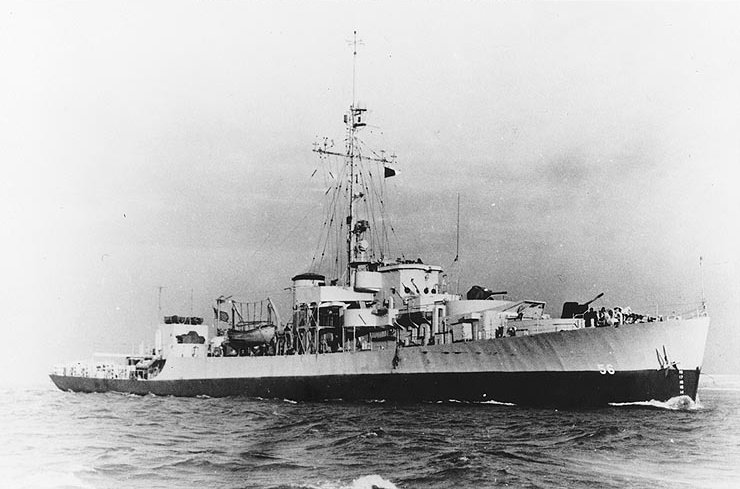
Tacoma-class frigate, USS Covington (PF-56) in 1945

S2-S2-AQ1 Tacoma-class frigate:

- Covington
- Sheboygan
- Abilene
- Beaufort
- Charlotte
- Manitowoc
- Gladwyne / Worcester
- Moberly / Scranton

C1-M-AV1 Type C1 cargo ship:

- Muscatine
- Muskingum
- Nicollet
- Pembina
- Pemiscot
- Pinellas
- Pipestone
- Pitkin
- Bight Knot (wrecked 1970)
- Ocean Plat
- Magnus Hitch

Globe Shipbuilding World War 1

Globe Shipbuilding built: cargo, Naval trawler and fishing trawler ships from 1918 to 1920:

Lake Washburn, Lake Borgne, Lake Medford, Lake Arline, Sea Gull, (Trawler: Petrel, Ripple, Ocean), Conotton, Contoocook, Coolspring, Copalgrove, Lake Glebe, Lake Glencoe, Lake Fiscus, Lake Fisher, Lake Fitch, Lake Fithian, Lake Flag, Lake Glaucus, Lake Gunni, Lake Harminia, Lake Hector, and Lake Justice.

== Walter Butler Duluth shipyard ==
Some of Walter Butler Shipbuilders Duluth ships: Duluth shipyard built C1-M-AV1 type C1 cargo ships, 2239 tons, 3,805 DWT:

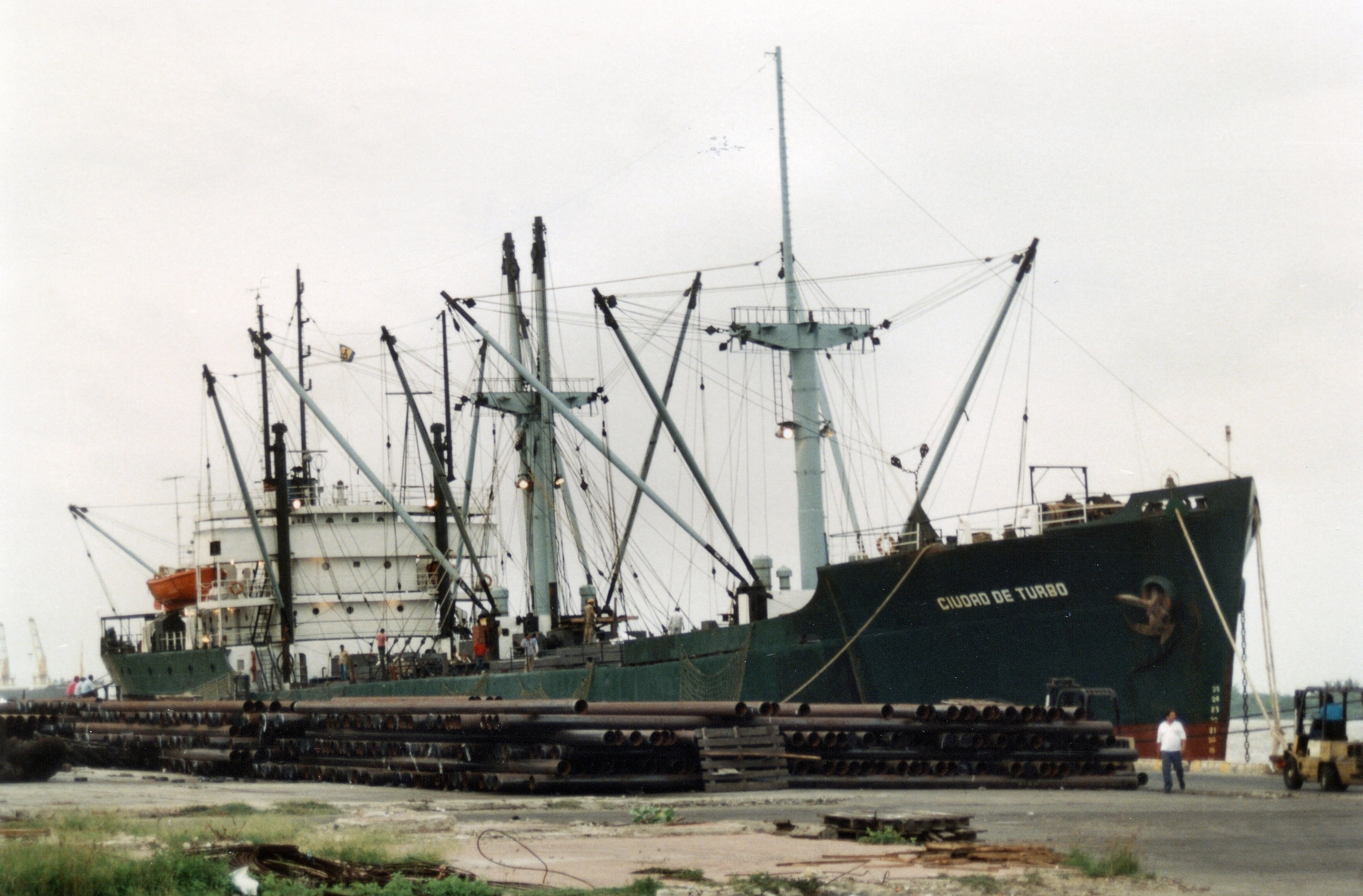
C1-M-AV1 type Ciudad de Turbo, built as Mainsheet Eye, the last ship built at Walter Butler Duluth shipyard

- Cape Somerset (Hull # 328, August 1944)
- Cape Stanhope
- Elmer J. Burr (wrecked 1946)
- William G. Fournier
- Kenneth E. Gruennert (wrecked 1953)
- Lewis Hall
- Joe P. Martinez
- William N. Nelson
- Alexander R. Nininger, Jr.
- Roband Hitch
- Harold W. Roberts
- Honda Knot
- Shamrock Knot
- Fiador Knot
- Lever's Bend
- Manrope Knot
- SS Marline Hitch
- Mainsheet Eye (Hull # 345, August 1945, last Walter Butler Duluth ship)

== Enbridge Ogdensburg Pier ==
Enbridge Ogdensburg Pier was opened in 1950 at the site of the former Walter Butler Superior shipyard. The Enbridge Ogdensburg Pier serves the inland Enbridge's Superior Terminal. Enbridge is a Canadian energy transportation company with headquarters in Calgary, Alberta. Enbridge transports, distributes and generates energy, in Canada and the United States. Enbridge operates in transportation, distribution and generation of crude oil and liquid hydrocarbons-natural gas. Enbridge Ogdensburg Pier as a dock for the energy transport ships. The Superior Terminal is 550-acre and is used to store and distributes crude oil to the United States. I also is connected to the Enbridge Pipeline System. About 20% United States crude oil imports come through the Terminal.

== See also ==
- Great Lakes Engineering Works
- Collingwood Shipbuilding Company
- Defoe Shipbuilding Company
- Manitowoc Shipbuilding Company
- American Ship Building Company
- Attack on Pearl Harbor
