= USS Covington =

USS Covington may refer to:

- USS Covington (1863), a side wheel steamer, purchased by the Union during the American Civil War
- USS Covington (ID-1409), a troop transport ship damaged by the German submarine U-86 and scuttled in 1918
- USS Covington (PF-56), a Tacoma-class frigate built during World War II
