= Hennepin =

Hennepin may refer to:

== Places in the United States ==
- Hennepin, Illinois, a village
- Hennepin, Oklahoma, a small community
- Hennepin Avenue, a street in Minneapolis, Minnesota
- Hennepin County, Minnesota
- Hennepin Township, Putnam County, Illinois

== Other uses ==
- Father Louis Hennepin (1626–1706), Belgian/French explorer of North America
- SS Hennepin, a shipwreck off the coast of Lake Michigan near South Haven, Michigan, United States
- USS Hennepin (AK-187) (1943–1946), US Navy cargo ship
- Hennepin Canal Parkway State Park, former site of the Hennepin Canal
