= USS Shreveport =

Two ships of the United States Navy have been named for the city of Shreveport, Louisiana.

- The first USS Shreveport (PF-23) was a Tacoma-class frigate, which served in the 1940s.
- The second USS Shreveport (LPD-12) was a Cleveland-class amphibious transport dock, which served from 1970 to 2007.
