= Albert J. Carpenter =

American Coast Guard admiral (1911–1999

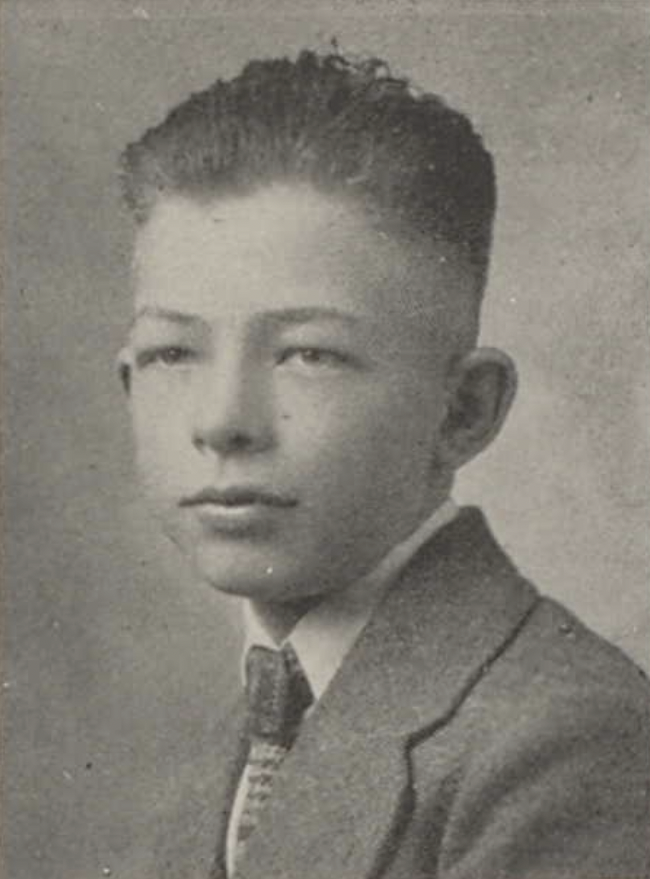
- Carpenter in his 1927 yearbook, The Pohob
- Born: June 9, 1911; Ely, Nevada, US
- Died: June 21, 1999 (aged 88)
- Education: BS, USCG Acad. (1933)
- Military career
- Branch: US Coast Guard
- Years: 1933–1968 (35.1 years)
- Rank: Rear admiral
- Commands: USS Sheboygan; USCGC Cherokee; USCGC Taney
- Conflicts: World War II

Albert J. Carpenter (9 June 1911 – 21 June 1999) was an officer in the United States Coast Guard from 1933–1968.

== Personal life ==
On 9 June 1911, Albert John Carpenter was born in Ely, Nevada. The eldest child of Robert J. and Kate P. Carpenter, in April 1930, he lived in Elko, Nevada and had three younger brothers: Louis R. (born 1913 or 1914), Edward P. (1919 or 1920), and Harry P. (1922 or 1923). As editor-in-chief of the yearbook (The Pohob), Carpenter graduated from Elko County High School in 1927, and then worked as an auditor for the Southern Pacific Railroad Company for two years.

Carpenter married Lucille Swenson (from Fullerton, Nebraska), and in June 1967, the couple had one son, John Loder Carpenter (born 15 December 1944). Albert Carpenter died on 21 June 1999.

== US Coast Guard career ==
Ranks held
Date	Insignia and rank	
15 May 1933	Ensign (rank)	Ensign
15 May 1936	Lieutenant (junior grade)	Lieutenant (junior grade)
16 July 1939	Lieutenant (navy)	Lieutenant
1 October 1942	Lieutenant commander (United States)	Lieutenant commander
1 January 1944	Commander (United States)	Commander
1 November 1955	Captain (United States O-6)	Captain
1 July 1963	Rear admiral (United States)	Rear admiral

Carpenter enrolled as a cadet at the United States Coast Guard Academy on 4 August 1930. He graduated on 15 May 1933 with a Bachelor of Science, and was immediately commissioned an ensign. From 1933–1938, Carpenter served aboard USCGC Shoshone out of Oakland, California; USCGC Atalanta out of Seattle; and USCGC Morris out of Seward, Alaska.

From June 1938 through September 1942, Carpenter taught mathematics and navigation at the Coast Guard Academy in New London, Connecticut. From October 1942 to October 1943, the lieutenant commander ran the academy's Reserve Training School. He then received command training at a Coast Guard base in St. Augustine, Florida and a US Navy base in Miami. Carpenter was given command of USS Sheboygan after its October 1944 commissioning, and led the ship on patrol out of the Canadian seaport Argentia in Newfoundland and Labrador.

Carpenter worked out of Coast Guard (USCG) headquarters (the Southern Railway Building) in Washington, D.C. from 1945–1949. He then commanded USCGC Cherokee for a year before returning to USCG HQ in July 1950 for four more years. After commanding USCGC Taney out of San Francisco from September 1954 through April 1956, Carpenter commanded the Mariannas Section through 1958. Returning to DC to attend the National War College from August 1958 – June 1959, he then stayed in the US capital in several administrative positions for three more years.

A series of Coast Guard District (CGD) commands followed: the 8th CGD in New Orleans from 1962–1963; 2nd CGD in St. Louis from 1963–1966; 11th CGD in Long Beach, California, from 1966–1967; and 3rd CGD in New York City from 1967–1968. It was this last command from which Carpenter—on 1 July 1968— was involuntarily retired as a rear admiral.
