= USS Hingham =

US Navy frigate

History

United States
- Name: USS Hingham
- Namesake: Hingham, Massachusetts
- Launched: 27 August 1943
- Sponsored by: Mrs. Katherine F. Harrington
- Commissioned: 3 November 1944
- Decommissioned: 5 June 1946
- Fate: Sold 15 August 1947 and scrapped

General characteristics
- Class & type: Tacoma-class frigate
- Displacement: 1,264 tons
- Length: 303 ft 11 in (92.63 m)
- Beam: 37 ft 6 in (11.43 m)
- Draft: 13 ft 8 in (4.17 m)
- Propulsion: Three boilers; 2 × 5,500 SHP turbines; two shafts
- Speed: 20 knots (37 km/h)
- Complement: 190
- Armament: 3 × 3 in/50 AA guns (3×1); 4 × 40 mm guns (2×2); 9 × 20 mm guns (9×1); 1 × Hedgehog projector; 8 × Y-gun depth charge projectors; 2 × depth charge racks

USS Hingham (PF-30), a Tacoma-class frigate, was the only ship of the United States Navy to be named for Hingham, Massachusetts. Hingham, originally designated PG-138, was launched under Maritime Commission contract by Walter Butler Shipbuilding Company in Superior, Wisconsin, on 27 August 1943, sponsored by Mrs. Katherine F. Harrington; and commissioned on 3 November 1944 after outfitting at Plaquemine, Louisiana. Her first commanding officer was Lieutenant Commander W. K. Earle, USCG.

Following shakedown training out of Bermuda, Hingham finished conversion to a weather ship at Boston, Massachusetts, and after escorting a merchant ship from NS Argentia, Newfoundland, to Boston reported on 3 January 1945 to the North Atlantic Weather Patrol. The ship then took up the arduous duties of weather patrol in the North Atlantic during winter, performing the task of reporting so vital to convoying and warship movements alike. She remained on station after the close of World War II, returning to Boston on 4 May 1946.

Hingham then sailed to Charleston, South Carolina, where she was decommissioned on 5 June 1946. The frigate was sold on 15 August 1947 to Sun Shipbuilding & Dry Dock Company of Chester, Pennsylvania, and scrapped.
