= USS Grainger =

Cargo ship of the United States Navy

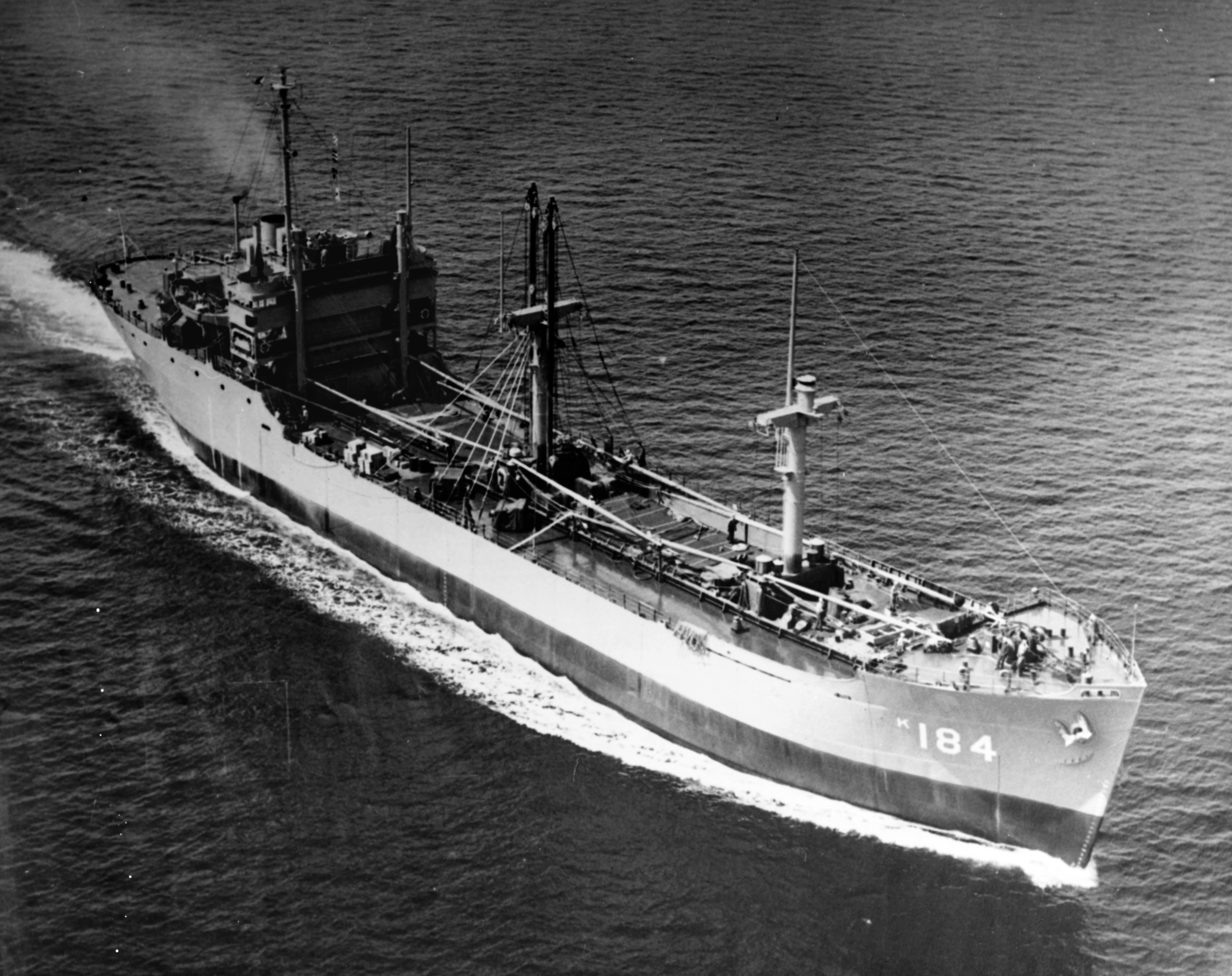

History

United States
- Name: Grainger
- Namesake: Grainger County, Tennessee
- Ordered: as type (C1-M-AV1) hull, MC hull 2115
- Builder: Walter Butler Shipbuilders, Inc., Superior, Wisconsin
- Yard number: 33
- Laid down: 1944
- Launched: 7 May 1944
- Sponsored by: Mrs. Carl Bong
- Commissioned: 25 January 1945
- Decommissioned: 25 July 1946
- Stricken: 15 August 1946
- Acquired: 9 May 1947
- Commissioned: 12 June 1947
- Decommissioned: 7 February 1956
- Stricken: 1 April 1960
- Identification: Hull symbol: AK-184; Code letters: NELU
- Honors and awards: 2 × battle stars for Korean service
- Fate: Sold for scrapping, 17 October 1960

General characteristics
- Class & type: Alamosa-class cargo ship
- Type: C1-M-AV1
- Tonnage: 5,032 long tons deadweight (DWT)
- Displacement: 2,382 long tons (2,420 t) (standard); 7,450 long tons (7,570 t) (full load)
- Length: 388 ft 8 in (118.47 m)
- Beam: 50 ft (15 m)
- Draft: 21 ft 1 in (6.43 m)
- Installed power: 1 × Nordberg, TSM 6 diesel engine; 1,750 shp (1,300 kW)
- Propulsion: 1 × propeller
- Speed: 11.5 kn (21.3 km/h; 13.2 mph)
- Capacity: 3,945 t (3,883 long tons) DWT; 9,830 cu ft (278 m^{3}) (refrigerated); 227,730 cu ft (6,449 m^{3}) (non-refrigerated)
- Complement: 15 Officers; 70 Enlisted
- Armament: 1 × 3 in (76 mm)/50 caliber dual purpose gun (DP); 6 × 20 mm (0.8 in) Oerlikon anti-aircraft (AA) cannons

USS Grainger (AK-184) was an Alamosa-class cargo ship that served the US Navy during the final months of World War II. In 1947 she was placed back in service and served in the Korean War, earning two battle stars

== Construction ==
Grainger was launched under U.S. Maritime Commission contract, MC hull 2115, 7 May 1944, by the Walter Butler Shipbuilding Co., Inc., Superior, Wisconsin; sponsored by Mrs. Carl Bong; and commissioned 26 January 1945.

== Service history ==
=== World War II-related service ===
After shakedown training out of Westwego, Louisiana, and Galveston, Texas, Grainger was assigned to the Naval Training Center, Miami, Florida, for duty as a school ship. She trained personnel in cargo handling and ship operation and maintenance until 14 September, when she departed New Orleans and proceeded by way of the Panama Canal Zone to arrive at San Pedro, California, 12 October.

Departing San Francisco 31 October Grainger sailed for Saipan, Tinian, Guam, and Seeadler Harbor, Manus Island. Having discharged all her cargo she left Manus Island 17 February 1946 and after touching at Pearl Harbor reached San Francisco 13 May. Ten days later Grainger proceeded to Seattle, Washington, and arrived there 26 May and began her inactivation overhaul. She was decommissioned there 25 July 1946 and returned to the Maritime Commission the next day. Her name was stricken from the Navy List 15 August 1946.

=== Post-war reactivation ===
Grainger was taken into the Navy again 9 May 1947, and commissioned 12 June 1947, at the Puget Sound Naval Shipyard, Bremerton, Washington and her name reinstated on the Navy List 23 June. Departing Bremerton she reached San Diego, California, 18 July, then sailed for Port Hueneme, California.

Departing Port Hueneme 21 August 1947 Grainger touched at Pearl Harbor before she arrived at Guam 19 October, to take up duty there. Grainger supplied the Mariana Islands and the Eastern Caroline Islands, with occasional trips to the Palau Islands until 9 April 1949 when she arrived Pearl Harbor.

After overhaul Grainger cleared Pearl Harbor 13 July and touched at San Francisco before reaching Seattle 16 August. Departing Seattle 28 August she carried out cargo operations at Kodiak and Adak, Alaska, before returning to Seattle 2 October 1949.

Grainger cleared Seattle a week later to take up her duty at Guam again, arriving there 20 December. She carried out her operations for the next 6 months supplying the Marshall Islands and the Mariana Islands.

=== Korean War support ===
With the outbreak of hostilities in Korea and shortage of ammunition ships in the Far East Grainger loaded with aircraft ammunition and cleared Guam 14 July 1950. She was to rendezvous with Admiral Arthur Dewey Struble's Task Force 77 on the 23d and rearm the carrier Valley Forge, but due to weather conditions had to complete her mission in Sasebo, Japan, the next day.

Here Grainger was assigned to the Logistics Support Group, Captain B. L. Austin, for the U.S. 7th Fleet as a replenishing ammunition ship. She continued this important job until 15 September when she got underway for the objective area in support of the landings at Inchon, one of the most successful amphibious operations in history. Grainger participated in the landings 16 September, and after landing her cargo remained in Inchon Harbor until 7 October, when she retired to Sasebo.

Departing Sasebo 21 October 1950 Grainger returned to Guam on the 28th and resumed her task of logistic support to the Marianas and the Carolines. Departing Kwajalein 2 March 1951, Grainger sailed for Pearl Harbor arriving 13 March. Here she took up duty contributing logistic support to Midway Island and Kwajalein atoll until 18 June 1953.

The ship then cleared Pearl Harbor to take up duty in Sasebo, where she arrived 12 July. With the exception of a voyage to Inchon, Korea, with refrigerated and dry stores for occupation troops, 6–13 October, Grainger steamed between Sasebo and Yokosuka until 19 March 1954, returning to Pearl Harbor 2 April, to take up her familiar runs to Kwajalein and Midway Island. Grainger again rotated to Sasebo, sailing on 5 March 1955, and she arrived there 29 March. Her visits included Buckner Bay, Okinawa; Subic Bay, Philippine Islands; Kaohsiung, Formosa; and Hong Kong.

=== Final decommissioning ===
Grainger departed Yokosuka 11 September, and going by way of Pearl Harbor reached Long Beach, California, 20 October 1955; 2 days later she shifted to San Diego, California, to undergo inactivation overhaul. Grainger decommissioned there 7 February 1956, and was turned over to the San Diego Group, Pacific Reserve Fleet.

Grainger remained out of commission in reserve there until she was disposed of and her name stricken from the Navy List 1 April 1960. The veteran cargo ship was advertised for sale twice, 7 July and 11 August 1960, but the Maritime Administration rejected both bids. Ultimately, however, The Learner Co., a Japanese firm, successfully bid on 17 October 1960, purchasing the vessel as a scrap hull on 17 October 1960, the title transfer taking place on 14 December 1960 and the vessel being delivered at San Diego.

== Honors and awards ==
Grainger received two battle stars for Korean service.

== Notes ==
Citations

== Bibliography ==
- "Grainger (AK-184)". Dictionary of American Naval Fighting Ships. Naval History and Heritage Command. 7 August 2016. This article incorporates text from this source, which is in the public domain.
- "C1 Cargo Ships". www.ShipbuildingHistory.com. 28 August 2009.
- "USS Grainger (AK-184)". NavSource. 8 November 2013.
- "Grainger (AK-184)". United States Department of Transportation. Archived from the original on 17 November 2016.
