= USS Habersham =

Cargo ship of the United States Navy

History

United States
- Name: Habersham
- Namesake: Habersham County, Georgia
- Ordered: as type (C1-M-AV1) hull, MC hull 2117
- Builder: Walter Butler Shipbuilders, Inc., Superior, Wisconsin
- Yard number: 35
- Laid down: 1944
- Launched: 7 June 1944
- Sponsored by: Mrs. Carl Gray, Jr.
- Acquired: 26 April 1945
- Commissioned: 12 May 1945
- Decommissioned: 9 April 1946
- Stricken: 17 April 1946
- Identification: Hull symbol: AK-186; Code letters: NENE
- Fate: Sold, 6 February 1947

Sweden
- Name: Rosa Thordén
- Owner: Thordén Lines AB
- Acquired: 6 February 1947
- Fate: Sold 1952

South Korea
- Name: Pusan (1952–1974); Busan (1974–1976)
- Namesake: City of Pusan, South Korea
- Owner: Korean Shipping Corporation
- Acquired: 1952
- Fate: Sold 1976

South Korea
- Name: Busan
- Owner: Ah Jin Shipping Ltd
- Acquired: 1976
- Fate: Sold 1976

South Korea
- Name: Sam Dae
- Owner: Sammisa Shipping Co., Ltd.
- Acquired: 1976
- Fate: 1978

South Korea
- Name: Sam Dae
- Owner: Tai Young Shipping Co., Ltd.
- Acquired: 1978
- Fate: Scrapped in Inchon, South Korea in 1979

General characteristics
- Class & type: Alamosa-class cargo ship
- Type: C1-M-AV1
- Tonnage: 5,032 long tons deadweight (DWT)
- Displacement: 2,382 long tons (2,420 t) (standard); 7,450 long tons (7,570 t) (full load)
- Length: 388 ft 8 in (118.47 m)
- Beam: 50 ft (15 m)
- Draft: 21 ft 1 in (6.43 m)
- Installed power: 1 × Nordberg, TSM 6 diesel engine; 1,750 shp (1,300 kW)
- Propulsion: 1 × propeller
- Speed: 11.5 kn (21.3 km/h; 13.2 mph)
- Capacity: 3,945 t (3,883 long tons) DWT; 9,830 cu ft (278 m^{3}) (refrigerated); 227,730 cu ft (6,449 m^{3}) (non-refrigerated)
- Complement: 15 Officers; 70 Enlisted
- Armament: 1 × 3 in (76 mm)/50 caliber dual purpose gun (DP); 6 × 20 mm (0.8 in) Oerlikon anti-aircraft (AA) cannons

USS Habersham (AK-186) was an Alamosa-class cargo ship that served the US Navy during the final months of World War II. She was named for Habersham County, Georgia.

== Construction ==
Habersham was launched 7 June 1944, by the Walter Butler Shipbuilding Company in Superior, Wisconsin, under a Maritime Commission contract, MC hull 2117. She was sponsored by Mrs. Carl Gray Jr. and acquired by the US Navy on 26 April 1945, and commissioned 12 May 1945.

== Service history ==
=== World War II service ===
Following shakedown training off Galveston, Texas the ship sailed 2 June 1945, for Gulfport, Mississippi, to take on cargo and departed four days later to join the Pacific Fleet. Habersham arrived at Pearl Harbor via the Canal Zone 30 June, unloaded her cargo, and returned to San Francisco with passengers and cargo 12 July. She then loaded cargo and sailed 21 July for Eniwetok, arriving on 7 August.

=== Post-war decommissioning ===
Habersham was at Eniwetok when the surrender of Japan was announced, and departed 9 September to carry cargo for occupation forces in Japan. Arriving Tokyo Bay, 17 September, she unloaded cargo and departed for Guam and San Francisco 27 November. She arrived 12 January 1946 and sailed for the East Coast on 11 February, arriving Norfolk, Virginia 6 March. Habersham decommissioned at Baltimore, Maryland 9 April 1946 and was returned to the Maritime Commission.

== Merchant ==
Sold to the Thordén Lines AB, for $693,862, for merchant service, she became Rosa Thordén. In 1952, she was sold to the Korean Shipping Corporation, and renamed Pusan. She was again renamed in 1974, to Busan, and then sold to Ah Jin Shipping Ltd., in 1976. She was sold again in 1976, to Sammisa Shipping Co, Ltd., and renamed Sam Dae. She was finally sold to Tai Young Shipping Co, Ltd., in 1978. On 14 April 1979 she was damaged by fire and scrapped later that year in Inchon, South Korea.

== Notes ==
Citations

== Bibliography ==
Online resources

- "Habersham (Ak-186)". Dictionary of American Naval Fighting Ships. Naval History and Heritage Command. This article incorporates text from this source, which is in the public domain.
- "C1 Cargo Ships". www.ShipbuildingHistory.com. 28 August 2009.
- "USS Habersham (Ak-186)". NavSource. 29 August 2014.
- "Habersham (Ak-186)". United States Department of Transportation. Archived from the original on 5 December 2015.
- Swiggum, S.; Kohli, M. (6 June 2009). "Thordén Rederierna / Thordén Lines AB / Finnish North America Line, 1926–1963". TheShipsList.
