= USS Glacier (AK-183) =

Cargo ship of the United States Navy

History

United States
- Name: Glacier
- Namesake: Glacier County, Montana
- Ordered: as type (C1-M-AV1) hull, MC hull 2114
- Builder: Walter Butler Shipbuilders, Inc., Superior, Wisconsin
- Yard number: 32
- Laid down: 1944
- Launched: 22 April 1944
- Sponsored by: Miss Agnes Kennedy
- Acquired: 29 March 1945
- Commissioned: 14 April 1945
- Decommissioned: 19 February 1946
- Stricken: 12 March 1946
- Identification: Hull symbol: AK-183; Code letters: NELQ
- Fate: Sold, 17 April 1948, to Koninklijke Nederlandsche StoombootMattschappij N.V., Amsterdam

History

Netherlands
- Name: Hydra
- Owner: Koninklijke Nederlandsche Stoomboot Mattschappij N.V.
- Acquired: 17 April 1948
- Fate: Sold 1962

History

Saudi Arabia
- Name: Asma B
- Owner: Saudi Lines
- Acquired: 1962
- Fate: Sold for scrapping in July 1970 at HSINKANG, China

General characteristics
- Class & type: Alamosa-class cargo ship
- Type: C1-M-AV1
- Tonnage: 5,032 long tons deadweight (DWT)
- Displacement: 2,382 long tons (2,420 t) (standard); 7,450 long tons (7,570 t) (full load)
- Length: 388 ft 8 in (118.47 m)
- Beam: 50 ft (15 m)
- Draft: 21 ft 1 in (6.43 m)
- Installed power: 1 × Nordberg, TSM 6 diesel engine; 1,750 shp (1,300 kW)
- Propulsion: 1 × propeller
- Speed: 11.5 kn (21.3 km/h; 13.2 mph)
- Capacity: 3,945 t (3,883 long tons) DWT; 9,830 cu ft (278 m^{3}) (refrigerated); 227,730 cu ft (6,449 m^{3}) (non-refrigerated)
- Complement: 15 Officers; 70 Enlisted
- Armament: 1 × 3 in (76 mm)/50 caliber dual purpose gun (DP); 6 × 20 mm (0.8 in) Oerlikon anti-aircraft (AA) cannons

USS Glacier (AK-183) was an Alamosa-class cargo ship acquired by the U.S. Navy during the final months of World War II. She served in the Pacific Ocean theatre of operations for a short period of time before being decommissioned and returned to the U.S. Maritime Administration for dispositioning.

== Construction ==
The third ship to be so named by the Navy, Glacier was launched 22 April 1944, under a Maritime Commission contract, MC hull 2114, by Walter Butler Shipbuilding, Inc., Superior, Wisconsin; sponsored by Miss Agnes Kennedy; acquired 29 March 1945, and commissioned 14 April 1945.

== Service history ==
=== World War II-related service ===
Following shakedown off Galveston, Texas, Glacier loaded lumber and metal drums at New Orleans, Louisiana, and sailed 18 May 1945 for Pearl Harbor, where she put in 12 June to off-load her cargo.

Underway 29 June with building supplies for Kwajalein, she returned via Eniwetok to San Francisco, California, 5 August. Subsequently, a 5-month voyage out of San Francisco brought general cargo to Pearl Harbor, Tarawa, Majuro, Eniwetok, Guam, and Saipan before Glacier moored at Norfolk, Virginia, 1 February 1946, her missions accomplished.

=== Post-war decommissioning ===
Decommissioned there 19 February 1946, she was returned to the Maritime Commission 3 days later and stricken from the Navy List 12 March 1946.

== Merchant service ==
Acquired by the Koninklijke Nederlandsche Stoomboot Mattschappij, N.V., of Amsterdam, Holland, and renamed Ydra, the former Navy cargo ship operated out of Amsterdam, under the Dutch flag, from 1947 to 1962.

She was sold in 1962, to a Saudi Arabian concern, the Saudi Lines, and renamed Asma B, she served commercially from 1962 to 1970 before being sold for scrap in July 1970 at HSINKANG, China.

== Honors and awards ==
Qualified Glacier personnel were eligible for the following:

- American Campaign Medal
- Asiatic-Pacific Campaign Medal
- World War II Victory Medal

== Notes ==
Citations

== Bibliography ==
Online resources

- "Glacier (AK-183)". Dictionary of American Naval Fighting Ships. Naval History and Heritage Command. 13 July 2015. This article incorporates text from this source, which is in the public domain.
- "C1 Cargo Ships". www.ShipbuildingHistory.com. 28 August 2009.
- "USS Glacier (AK-183)". NavSource. 18 July 2014.
