= USS Poughkeepsie (PF-26) =

Tacoma-class frigate

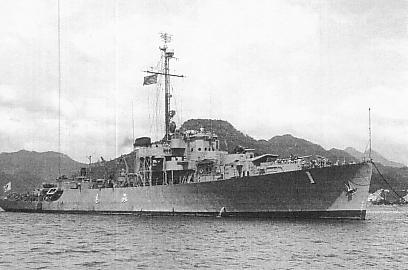
- JDS Momi in 1953

History

United States
- Name: Poughkeepsie
- Namesake: City of Poughkeepsie, New York
- Reclassified: PF-26, 15 April 1943
- Builder: Walter Butler Shipbuilding Company, Superior, Wisconsin
- Yard number: 23
- Laid down: 3 June 1943
- Launched: 12 August 1943
- Sponsored by: Mrs. Frank M. Doran
- Commissioned: 6 September 1944
- Decommissioned: 2 September 1945
- Fate: Transferred to Soviet Navy, 2 September 1945
- Acquired: Returned by Soviet Navy, 31 October 1949
- In service: with Shipping Control Authority for the Japanese Merchant Marine, 1951
- Fate: Transferred to Japan Maritime Self-Defense Force, 14 January 1953
- Stricken: 1 December 1961

Soviet Union
- Name: EK-27
- Acquired: 2 September 1945
- Commissioned: 2 September 1945
- Fate: Returned to United States, 31 October 1949

Japan
- Name: Momi
- Acquired: 14 January 1953
- Renamed: YAC-13, 1 April 1965
- Decommissioned: 1 April 1965
- Fate: Transferred to South Korea for cannibalization for spare parts, early 1969

General characteristics
- Class & type: Tacoma-class frigate
- Displacement: 1,430 long tons (1,453 t) light; 2,415 long tons (2,454 t) full
- Length: 303 ft 11 in (92.63 m)
- Beam: 37 ft 6 in (11.43 m)
- Draft: 13 ft 8 in (4.17 m)
- Propulsion: 2 × 5,500 shp (4,101 kW) turbines; 3 boilers; 2 shafts
- Speed: 20 knots (37 km/h; 23 mph)
- Complement: 190
- Armament: 3 × 3"/50 dual purpose guns (3x1); 4 x 40 mm guns (2×2); 9 × 20 mm guns (9×1); 1 × Hedgehog anti-submarine mortar; 8 × Y-gun depth charge projectors; 2 × Depth charge tracks

USS Poughkeepsie (PF-26), a Tacoma-class frigate in commission from 1944 to 1945, was the first ship of the United States Navy to be named for Poughkeepsie, New York. She later served in the Soviet Navy as EK-27 and in the Japan Maritime Self-Defense Force as JDS Momi (PF-4), JDS Momi (PF-284), and as YAC-13.

== Construction and commissioning ==
Originally classified as a patrol gunboat, PG-134, Poughkeepsie was reclassified as a patrol frigate, PF-26, on 15 April 1943. She was laid down for the Maritime Commission on 3 June 1943, by the Walter Butler Shipbuilding Company, Inc., in Superior, Wisconsin, and launched on 12 August 1943, sponsored by Mrs. Frank M. Doran. The ship was transferred to the US Navy and 'commissioned on 6 September 1944.

== Service history ==
=== U.S. Navy, World War II, 1944-1945 ===
After shakedown off Bermuda, Poughkeepsie called at the Philadelphia Naval Shipyard in Philadelphia, Pennsylvania, for post-shakedown repairs from 29 October 1944 through 31 January 1945. During February and March 1945, she made one convoy escort run to Guantánamo Bay, Cuba. Then, after anti-submarine warfare training in the New London Operating Area off New London, Connecticut, at the end of March 1945, she commenced antisubmarine patrols and convoy escort duties along the United States East Coast, operating between New York City and Norfolk, Virginia, through 3 July 1945.

Selected for transfer to the Soviet Navy in Project Hula, a secret program for the transfer of U.S. Navy ships to the Soviet Navy at Cold Bay in the Territory of Alaska in anticipation of the Soviet Union joining the war against Japan, Poughkeepsie stood out of New York Harbor on 9 July 1945, transited the Panama Canal, reported to Commander, United States Pacific Fleet, for duty, and put in at Seattle, Washington, for repairs and alterations in preparation for her transfer. Upon completion of these, she proceeded to Cold Bay and soon began the training of her new Soviet crew.

=== Soviet Navy, 1945–1949 ===
Following the completion of training for her Soviet crew, Poughkeepsie was decommissioned on 2 September 1945 at Cold Bay and transferred to the Soviet Union under Lend-Lease immediately along with her sister ship USS Bayonne (PF-21). Commissioned into the Soviet Navy immediately, Poughkeepsie was designated as a storozhevoi korabl ("escort ship") and renamed EK-27 in Soviet service. She soon departed Cold Bay bound for Petropavlovsk-Kamchatsky in the Soviet Union. Too late for World War II service with the Soviet Navy, EK-27 served as a patrol vessel in the Soviet Far East.

In February 1946, the United States began negotiations for the return of ships loaned to the Soviet Union. On 8 May 1947, United States Secretary of the Navy James V. Forrestal informed the United States Department of State that the United States Department of the Navy wanted 480 of the 585 combatant ships it had transferred to the Soviet Union for World War II use returned, EK-27 among them. Negotiations for the return of the ships were protracted, but on 31 October 1949 the Soviet Union finally returned EK-27 to the U.S. Navy at Yokosuka, Japan.

=== Shipping Control Authority for the Japanese Merchant Marine, 1951 ===
Reverting to her original name, Poughkeepsie remained at Yokosuka in an inactive status until nominated for transfer to the Allied Shipping Control Authority for the Japanese Merchant Marine on 23 March 1951 for duty as a weather ship.

=== Japan Maritime Self-Defense Force, 1953-1969 ===
The United States loaned the ship to Japan on 14 January 1953 for use in the Japan Maritime Self-Defense Force, which renamed her JDS Momi (PF-4) (もみ (PF-4); "abies firma"). Momi was redesignated PF-284 on 1 September 1957. The U.S. Navy struck her from the Naval Vessel Register on 1 December 1961 and transferred her to Japan outright on 28 August 1962.

Decommissioned on 1 April 1965, Momi was reclassified as an "auxiliary stock craft" (YAC), renamed YAC-13, and used thereafter as a non-operable dockside training ship until early 1969, when she was transferred to South Korea to be cannibalized for spare parts for the Republic of Korea Navy's Tacoma-class frigates.
