= USS Herkimer =

Cargo ship of the United States Navy

History

United States
- Name: Herkimer
- Namesake: Herkimer County, New York (which itself was named after Nicholas Herkimer)
- Ordered: as type (C1-M-AV1) hull, MC hull 2119
- Builder: Walter Butler Shipbuilders Inc., Superior, Wisconsin
- Yard number: 37
- Laid down: 10 April 1944
- Launched: 2 July 1944
- Sponsored by: Miss Ann Farley
- Acquired: 25 June 1945
- Commissioned: 14 July 1945
- Decommissioned: 1 February 1946
- Stricken: 5 June 1946
- Identification: Hull symbol: AK-188; Code letters: NENN
- Fate: placed in service with Military Sea Transportation Service (MSTS), 1 July 1950
- Notes: used by the U.S. Army in Japan as USAT Herkimer (1946–1950)

United States
- Name: Herkimer
- Operator: MSTS
- In service: 1 July 1950
- Out of service: 15 July 1973
- Stricken: 15 July 1973
- Identification: Hull symbol: T-AK-188
- Fate: loaned to the Trust Territories of the Pacific, 15 July 1973

Trust Territory of the Pacific Islands
- Name: Herkimer
- In service: 15 July 1973
- Identification: IMO number: 7338341
- Fate: permanent transfer 31 April 1982; Scrapped November 1984

General characteristics
- Class & type: Alamosa-class cargo ship
- Type: C1-M-AV1
- Tonnage: 5,032 long tons deadweight (DWT)
- Displacement: 2,382 long tons (2,420 t) (standard); 7,450 long tons (7,570 t) (full load)
- Length: 388 ft 8 in (118.47 m)
- Beam: 50 ft (15 m)
- Draft: 21 ft 1 in (6.43 m)
- Installed power: 1 × Nordberg, TSM 6 diesel engine; 1,750 shp (1,300 kW)
- Propulsion: 1 × propeller
- Speed: 11.5 kn (21.3 km/h; 13.2 mph)
- Capacity: 3,945 t (3,883 long tons) DWT; 9,830 cu ft (278 m^{3}) (refrigerated); 227,730 cu ft (6,449 m^{3}) (non-refrigerated)
- Complement: 15 Officers; 70 Enlisted
- Armament: 1 × 3 in (76 mm)/50 caliber dual purpose gun (DP); 6 × 20 mm (0.8 in) Oerlikon anti-aircraft (AA) cannons

USS Herkimer (AK-188) was an Alamosa-class cargo ship that served the US Navy during the final months of World War II. Post-war she served in the Pacific Ocean theatre of operations for some time with the US Army as USAT Herkimer, and then as USNS Herkimer (T-AK-188), with the Military Sea Transportation Service (MSTS) from 1950 to 1973. She was then transferred to the navy of the Trust Territory of the Pacific Islands (TTPI).

== Construction ==
Herkimer was laid down under U.S. Maritime Commission contract, MC hull 2119, by Walter Butler Shipbuilders, Inc., Superior, Wisconsin, 10 April 1944; launched 2 July 1944; sponsored by Miss Ann Farley; acquired by the Navy 25 June 1945; and commissioned at New Orleans, Louisiana, 14 July 1945.

== Service history ==
=== World War II-related service ===
After shakedown in the Gulf of Mexico, Herkimer loaded cargo at Gulfport, Mississippi, then departed 22 August for the Western Pacific Ocean. She reached Subic Bay, Luzon, 7 October; unloaded refrigerated cargo; and sailed the 13th carrying US Army equipment for occupation forces stationed in Japan.

She arrived Sasebo, Japan, 20 October and operated there until 30 December when she departed for Yokosuka. Following her arrival 2 January 1946, she was stripped of Navy gear. She then steamed to Yokohama 16 January, decommissioned 1 February, and transferred to the US Army.

=== US Army service ===
Herkimer was operated by a Japanese merchant crew for the Supreme Commander of Allied Forces in Japan until 1 July 1950 when she was reacquired by the US Navy. After refitting, she was assigned to the MSTS 28 February 1951, and designated T-AK 188.

=== Korean War support ===
Crewed by civilians, she participated in the Korean supply run from Japan supporting the repulse of Communist aggression in South Korea. Operating out of Moji, Kure, and Yokohama, she transported vital military cargo to American-held South Korean ports during the remainder of the conflict.

Following the 1953 Armistice in Korea, Herkimer continued supply runs between Japan and South Korea. In response to the scheduled transfer of North Vietnam to Communist control, she departed Yokohama 6 November 1954 to provide support for Operation Passage to Freedom. She reached Haiphong, North Vietnam, 15 November; and during the next 2 months she transported cargo southward to St. Jacques and Saigon. After completing three runs to South Vietnamese ports, she departed Saigon 23 January 1955 and arrived Kobe, Japan, 1 February.

Resuming cargo runs out of Japanese ports, Herkimer remained in the Western Pacific since 1955. Cargo operations have sent her primarily to Inchon, Pusan, and other South Korean ports; and she has made numerous cargo runs along the Japanese coast from Wakkanai and Hakodate, Hokkaido, to Kagoshima and Nagasaki, Kyūshū. In addition she has steamed from Korea to Southeast Asia while supporting America's determination to maintain peace and contain Communism in the Far East. She has steamed from ports in Japan and the Philippine Islands, transporting military supplies to Formosa between 1961 and 1965.

=== Vietnam War ===
In response to American efforts to support South Vietnam, she resumed intermittent cargo runs to South Vietnam in February 1962. She remained in the Western Pacific, serving the forces of freedom in the Far East as a veteran carrier of vital military cargo.

=== Decommissioning ===
Herkimer continued to support MSTS operations in the Pacific theatre until 15 July 1973 when she was placed out of service and struck from the Navy List.

== Merchant service ==
She was then loaned, 15 July 1973, to the Department of the Interior (DOI) for use in the TTPI. On 31 April 1982, she was permanently transferred to the DOI for continued use in the TTPI. The ship was scrapped in November 1984.

== Notes ==
Citations

== Bibliography ==
Online resources

- "Herkimer". Dictionary of American Naval Fighting Ships. Naval History and Heritage Command. This article incorporates text from this source, which is in the public domain.
- "C1 Cargo Ships". ShipbuildingHistory.com. 28 August 2009.
- "USS Herkimer (AK-188)". NavSource. 18 April 2014.
- "Herkimer (AK-188)". United States Department of Transportation. Archived from the original on 10 March 2016.
