= Globe Shipbuilding Company =

Shipyard in Wisconsin, United States

- Industry: Shipbuilding
- Founded: 1917
- Defunct: 1920 (first iteration); 1947 (second iteration)
- Headquarters: Superior, Wisconsin, United States
- Products: Cargo ships and wartime vessels

Globe Shipbuilding Company was a shipyard located in Superior, Wisconsin, active during World War I and World War II. The yard constructed vessels for the United States Shipping Board during World War I and later built ships under federal contract during World War II. The site later became the subject of historical preservation efforts.

== History ==
=== World War I ===
Globe Shipbuilding Company began operations in Superior in 1917 following the expansion of American ship production after U.S. entry into World War I. The first keel was laid in September 1917, and by the spring of 1918 multiple vessels were under construction.

In April 1918, the cargo vessel Lake Washburn was launched for the United States Shipping Board. It was described as a 261-foot freighter with a 43-foot beam and a carrying capacity of approximately 3,500 tons.

By December 1918, Globe had launched at least eleven vessels.

=== Vessels constructed (World War I) ===
Following the United States’ entry into World War I in April 1917, the federal government undertook an unprecedented expansion of the American merchant marine through the United States Shipping Board and its operational arm, the Emergency Fleet Corporation (EFC). The program mobilized shipyards nationwide to construct standardized cargo vessels capable of transporting troops, coal, grain, munitions, and other critical supplies to Allied forces in Europe.

Globe Shipbuilding Company was part of this national mobilization effort. Between 1918 and 1920, the yard constructed a series of steel cargo steamers for the Shipping Board. Many were built to standardized Emergency Fleet Corporation cargo designs commonly referred to as “Laker”-type vessels, suitable for both Great Lakes and ocean service. These ships formed part of the rapidly assembled merchant fleet that supported the final year of the war and continued in commercial service after the Armistice.

Several Globe-built vessels later had extended operational histories under private ownership or foreign registry. Some were wrecked or lost to marine casualties, while others survived into the interwar period and were destroyed during World War II, reflecting the long service life of ships constructed under the emergency program.

The vessels constructed by Globe during World War I included:

- Lake Washburn – Entered commercial service after the war; later renamed and lost during World War II.
- Lake Borgne – Wrecked in 1918.
- Lake Medford – Entered foreign service; later torpedoed and sunk during World War II.
- Lake Arline – Sold to private owners; later scrapped.
- Sea Gull – Later commercial service; ultimately scrapped.
- Petrel – Entered postwar commercial service; later scrapped.
- Ripple – Served in merchant service; later scrapped.
- Ocean – Entered commercial service; later disposed of under private ownership.
- Conotton – Postwar commercial service; later scrapped.
- Contoocook – Entered merchant service; later scrapped.
- Coolspring – Sold into commercial service; later scrapped.
- Copalgrove – Postwar merchant service; later scrapped.
- Lake Glebe – Entered private ownership; later scrapped.
- Lake Glencoe – Sold for commercial service; later scrapped.
- Lake Fiscus – Postwar merchant service; later scrapped.
- Lake Fisher – Entered commercial service; later scrapped.
- Lake Fitch – Later commercial ownership; ultimately scrapped.
- Lake Fithian – Served in merchant fleet; later scrapped.
- Lake Flag – Entered private service; later scrapped.
- Lake Glaucus – Postwar merchant service; later scrapped.
- Lake Gunni – Sold into commercial service; later scrapped.
- Lake Harminia – Entered private ownership; later scrapped.
- Lake Hector – Postwar merchant service; later scrapped.
- Lake Justice – Commercial service after the war; later scrapped.

==== Community involvement ====
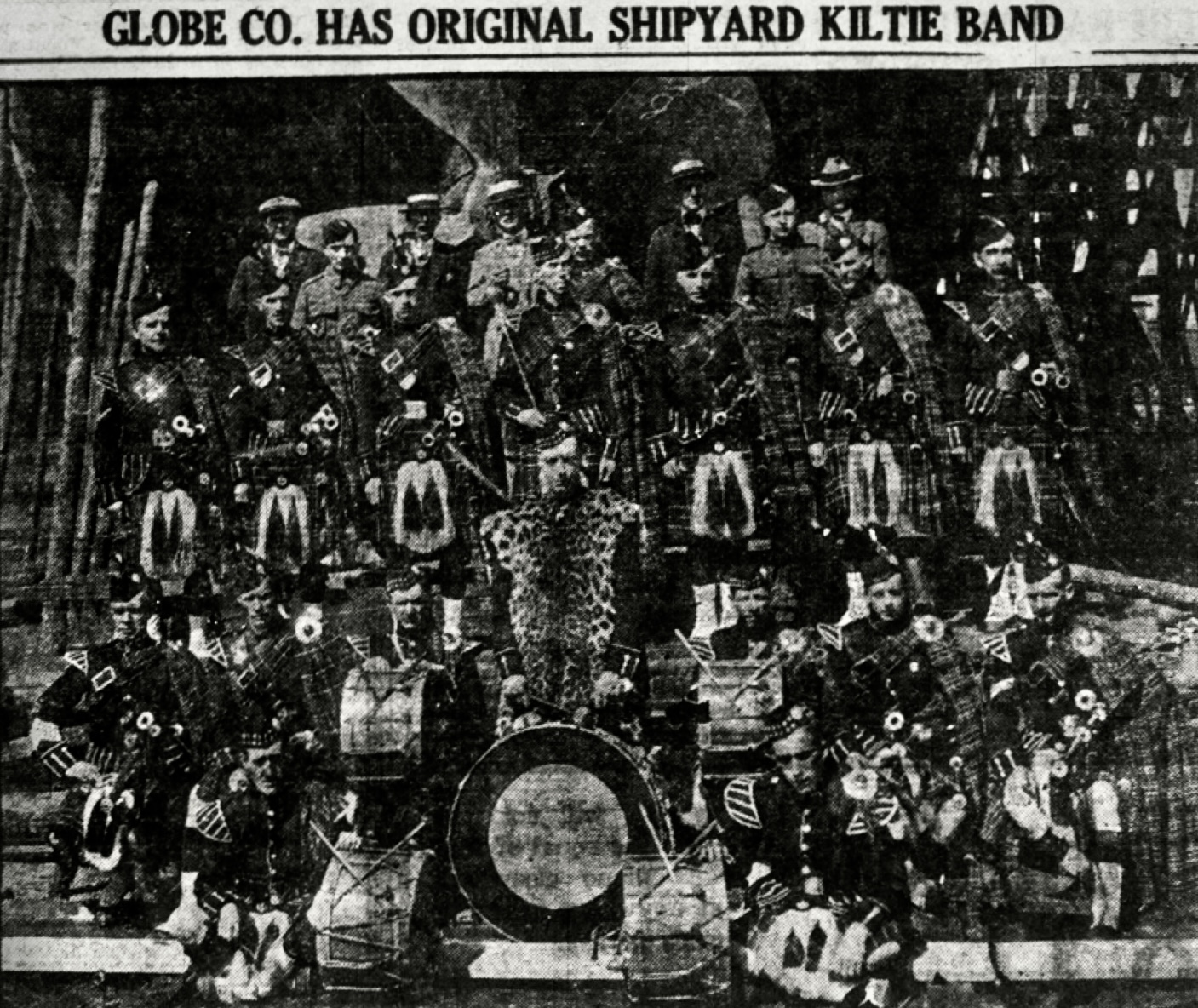
Globe Shipyard of Superior's WWI Kiltie Band, 1918

During World War I, Globe Shipbuilding participated in Liberty Loan events and civic celebrations in Superior. Newspaper accounts documented a company-sponsored “kiltie band,” organized by general superintendent James McKellar, which performed at ship launchings and public events.

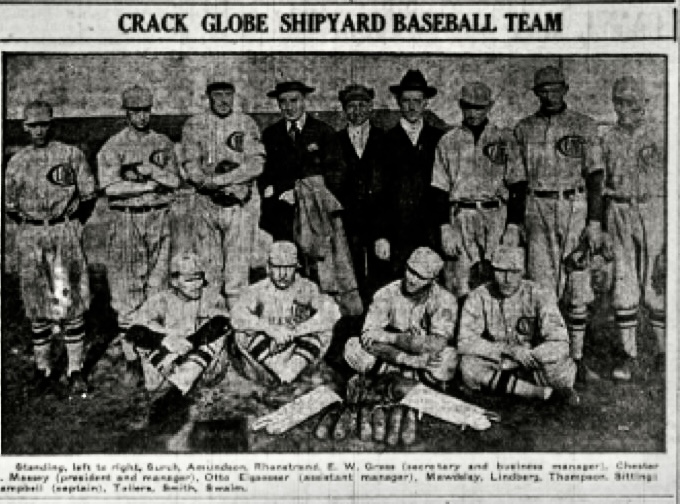
Globe Shipyard of Superior's Baseball Team, 1918

The yard also sponsored organized athletic teams. The Globe Shipyard baseball team competed in the Twin Ports industrial league and was described in contemporary coverage as a leading club composed largely of yard employees.

Globe employees also fielded bowling teams in the Superior City League.

=== World War II ===
Shipbuilding resumed in Superior during World War II. According to an August 1942 report, local organizers had first discussed establishing the wartime yard approximately two years earlier, around 1940. It was noted that organizers of the wartime shipyard deliberately revived the name “Globe” in reference to the earlier World War I company.

Between 1942 and 1945, Globe constructed 29 ships under federal contract as part of the wartime production effort.

Retrospective coverage described Globe as part of the broader Twin Ports shipbuilding effort employing thousands of workers during the war years. Women were employed in welding and other industrial roles at the yard during the war. According to its historical marker, of its 2,500 employees, 230 were women in 1944. One vessel constructed at Globe in 1944 was the cargo ship USS Pembina, later the subject of preservation efforts.

Operations ended in 1947 following the conclusion of the war.

=== Vessels constructed (World War II) ===
During World War II, Globe Shipbuilding Company constructed vessels under United States Maritime Commission contracts as part of the Emergency Shipbuilding Program.

==== V4-M-A1 oceangoing tugs ====
Globe constructed ten V4-M-A1 oceangoing tugs in 1943 for the War Shipping Administration. Several Globe-built vessels participated in Operation Overlord in June 1944. Farallon assisted in construction of the Mulberry artificial harbors off the Normandy coast, while Trinidad Head and Black Rock were among the oceangoing tugs supporting Allied landing operations.

- Point Sur – Scrapped, 1974
- Farallon – Sold to Mexico in 1969; scrapped 1978
- Point Cabrillo – Scrapped, 1974
- Trinidad Head – Scrapped 1969
- Scotch Cap – Scrapped
- Watch Hill – Scrapped, 1973
- Wood Island – Scrapped, 1973
- Sands Point – Scrapped, 1982
- Point Judith – Scrapped, 1978
- Black Rock – Scrapped 1969

==== S2-S2-AQ1 Tacoma-class patrol frigates ====
- Covington
- Sheboygan
- Abilene
- Beaufort
- Charlotte
- Manitowoc

==== C1-M-AV1 cargo ships ====
- Muscatine
- Muskingum
- Nicollet
- Pembina
- Pemiscot
- Pinellas
- Pipestone
- Pitkin
- Bight Knot — sold private 1947, scrapped 1970
- Ocean Plat — sold private 1947, scrapped 1970
- Magnus Hitch — sold private 1947, scrapped 1971

== Documentary and legacy ==
In the early 1980s, 16mm color film footage documenting World War II shipbuilding operations at Globe resurfaced. The footage had been recorded by Harold Andresen, who served as safety director at the yard from 1942 to 1945.

Beginning in 1983, preservation efforts were organized by Barry Singer of the Superior Public Library to assemble the footage into a documentary and to locate former shipyard workers for interviews. The completed documentary, Remembering the Globe, was released in 1989 by the Superior Public Library. The film credits include performance of a victory march played by the original band, The Globe Shipyard theme, by the University of Wisconsin–Superior Symphonic Band, directed by Dave Hagedorn, with music arranged by Bradley Bombardier.

Contemporary coverage described the documentary as an important visual record of wartime shipbuilding in the Twin Ports.

During the 1990s, unsuccessful efforts were made to return the former Globe-built vessel USS Pembina to the Twin Ports region.

The Globe name continued to hold local recognition in the postwar years. In the early 1950s, a news and magazine store known as “Globe News” opened at the corner of Tower Avenue and Belknap Street in Superior. The store adopted a globe-themed logo that later appeared in the opening sequence of the 1989 documentary Remembering the Globe.

A historical marker recognizing the Globe Shipbuilding Company was installed near Barker's Island in 1990 and rededicated in 2021.
