= USS Gwinnett =

Cargo ship of the United States Navy

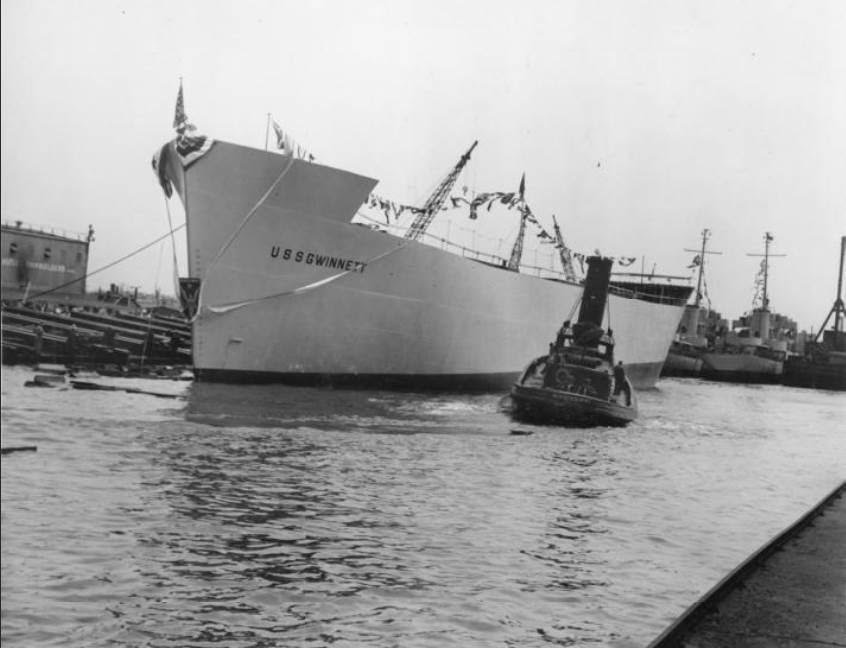
- Launching of Gwinnett (AG-92), 14 May 1944, at Walter Butler Shipbuilders, Inc., Superior, Wisconsin

History

United States
- Name: Gwinnett
- Namesake: Gwinnett County, Georgia
- Ordered: as type (C1-M-AV1) hull, MC hull 2116
- Awarded: 10 August 1943
- Builder: Walter Butler Shipbuilders, Inc., Superior, Wisconsin
- Cost: $1,714,017.46
- Yard number: 34
- Laid down: 21 December 1943
- Launched: 14 May 1944
- Sponsored by: Mrs. Oliva Dionne
- Completed: 6 November 1944
- Acquired: 13 March 1945
- Commissioned: 10 April 1945
- Decommissioned: 11 February 1946
- Reclassified: Miscellaneous Auxiliary (AG), before 14 May 1944; Aviation Supply Issue Ship (AVS), 25 May 1945
- Refit: Gwinnett-class Aviation Stores Issue Ship, at Port Houston Iron Works, Houston, Texas, 14 May 1944 to 13 March 1945
- Stricken: 26 February 1946
- Identification: Hull symbol: AK-185; Hull symbol: AG-92; Hull symbol: AVS-5; Code letters: NEMV; IMO number: 5306954
- Honors and awards: 1 × battle stars
- Fate: Laid up in Suisun Bay Reserve Fleet, 11 February 1946, sold, 18 June 1947

Republic of France
- Name: Sainte Helene
- Acquired: 18 June 1947
- Fate: Sold

Philippines
- Name: Prince K.L.
- Fate: Grounded, 1968, scrapped, 1970

General characteristics
- Class & type: Alamosa-class cargo ship (1943–1945); Gwinnett-class aviation stores issue ship (1945–1946)
- Type: C1-M-AV1
- Tonnage: 5,032 LT DWT
- Displacement: 2,382 long tons (2,420 t) (standard); 7,450 long tons (7,570 t) (full load)
- Length: 388 ft 8 in (118.47 m)
- Beam: 50 ft (15 m)
- Draft: 21 ft 1 in (6.43 m)
- Installed power: 1 × Nordberg, TSM 6 diesel engine; 1,750 shp (1,300 kW)
- Propulsion: 1 × propeller
- Speed: 11.5 kn (21.3 km/h; 13.2 mph)
- Capacity: 3,945 t (3,883 long tons) DWT; 9,830 cu ft (278 m^{3}) (refrigerated); 227,730 cu ft (6,449 m^{3}) (non-refrigerated)
- Complement: 15 Officers; 70 Enlisted
- Armament: 1 × 3 in (76 mm)/50 caliber dual purpose gun (DP); 6 × 20 mm (0.8 in) Oerlikon anti-aircraft (AA) cannons

USS Gwinnett (AK-185/AG-92/AVS-5) was originally an Alamosa-class cargo ship acquired by the U.S. Navy shortly before the end of World War II and converted into a Gwinnett-class aviation stores issue ship. She was found to be excess-to-needs and was placed into reserve in 1946. Gwinnett was named for Gwinnett County, Georgia.

== Constructed ==
Gwinnett was laid down under a Maritime Commission (MARCOM) contract, MCE hull 2116, on 21 December 1943, by Walter Butler Shipbuilders, Inc., Superior, Wisconsin. She was designated AK-185, a "dry cargo" ship. Before being launched, on 14 May 1944, she was redesignated AG-92, a "miscellaneous auxiliary"; sponsored by Mrs. Oliva Dionne, mother of the Dionne quintuplets. After being taken down the Mississippi River to New Orleans, Louisiana, the ship was outfitted at Port Houston Iron Works, Houston, Texas, and commissioned there 10 April 1945.

== Service history ==
Soon after commissioning, Gwinnett was redesigned AVS-5, "aviation stores issues", on 25 May 1945. After shakedown in the Gulf of Mexico, she was ordered to the Pacific coast for disposal.

== Defense fleet ==
Gwinnett arrived San Francisco, 25 January 1946. She decommissioned and was simultaneously redelivered to MARCOM, 11 February 1946, and placed in the Suisun Bay Reserve Fleet, in Suisun Bay, California. When she entered the reserve fleet she had an estimated $104,750 of damage.

== Merchant service ==
Gwinnett was sold to the Republic of France, on 18 June 1947. She was reflagged and renamed Sainte Helene. She was later sold and reflagged in the Philippines, and renamed Prince K.L.. In 1968, she was grounded in the Sulu Sea, where she sustained severe damage to her hull. Her cargo was salvaged but the repairs were uneconomical, she was scrapped in Hong Kong, in 1970.

== Bibliography ==
- "Gwinnett". Dictionary of American Naval Fighting Ships. Naval History and Heritage Command. This article incorporates text from this source, which is in the public domain.
- Priolo, Gary P. (13 August 2021). "Gwinnett (AK-185)". NavSource.
- "GWINNETT (AVS-5)". United States Department of Transportation.
- "Gwinnett".
