= USS Dearborn =

Tacoma-class patrol frigate

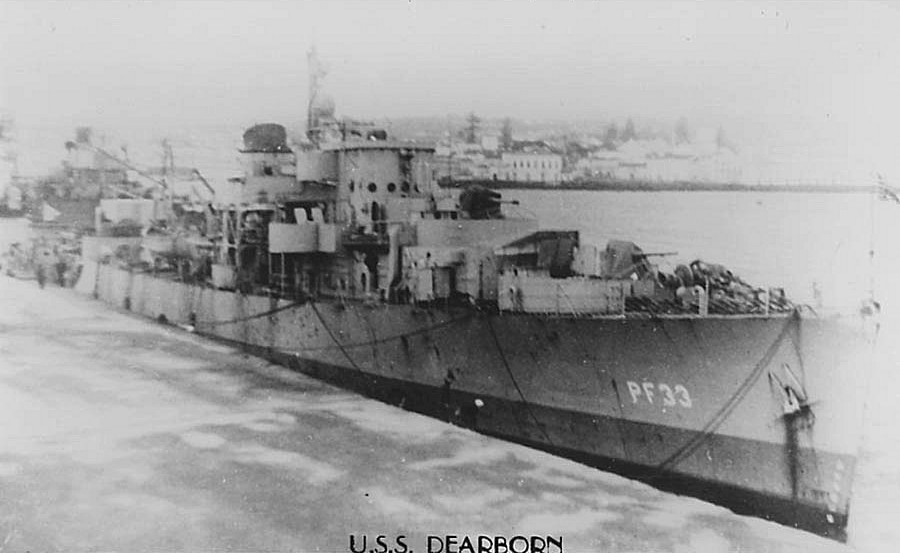

History

United States
- Name: Toledo (1943); Dearborn (1943–1946)
- Namesake: City of Toledo, Ohio; City of Dearborn, Michigan
- Ordered: as PG-141
- Builder: Walter Butler Shipbuilding Co., Superior, Wisconsin
- Laid down: 15 August 1943
- Launched: 27 September 1943
- Commissioned: 10 September 1944
- Decommissioned: 5 June 1946
- Renamed: Dearborn, 27 September 1943
- Reclassified: PF-33, 15 April 1943
- Fate: Sold for scrapping, 8 July 1947

General characteristics
- Class & type: Tacoma-class frigate
- Displacement: 1,430 long tons (1,453 t) light; 2,415 long tons (2,454 t) full
- Length: 303 ft 11 in (92.63 m)
- Beam: 37 ft 11 in (11.56 m)
- Draft: 13 ft 8 in (4.17 m)
- Propulsion: 2 × 5,500 shp (4,101 kW) turbines; 3 boilers; 2 shafts
- Speed: 20 knots (37 km/h; 23 mph)
- Complement: 190
- Armament: 3 × 3"/50 dual purpose guns (3x1); 4 x 40 mm guns (2×2); 9 × 20 mm guns (9×1); 1 × Hedgehog anti-submarine mortar; 8 × Y-gun depth charge projectors; 2 × Depth charge tracks

USS Dearborn (PF-33), a Tacoma-class frigate, is so far the only ship of the United States Navy to be named for Dearborn, Michigan.

== Construction ==
The ship was laid down on 15 August 1943 by Walter Butler Shipbuilding Company of Superior, Wisconsin, under a Maritime Commission contract, as Toledo. She was renamed Dearborn and launched on 27 September 1943, sponsored by Mrs. R. C. Dahlinger of Dearborn, Michigan; and commissioned on 10 September 1944.

== Service history ==
Sailing from Boston, Massachusetts, on 3 November 1944, Dearborn arrived at NS Argentia, Newfoundland, four days later for duty on weather patrol. She had similar duty off Bermuda, as well as plane guard and search and rescue duty until 30 April 1946 when she arrived back at Boston. On 7 May, she departed for Charleston, South Carolina, arriving there two days later. Dearborn was decommissioned there on 5 June 1946, and sold on 8 July 1947.
