= USS Muskegon (PF-24) =

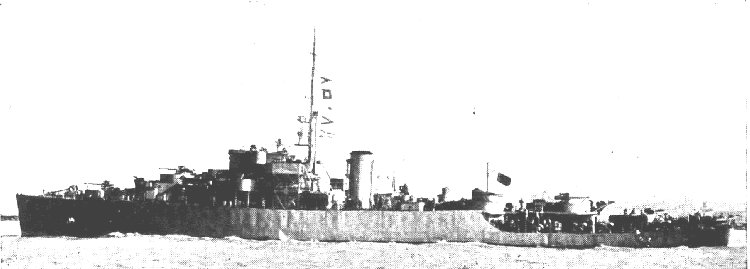
- USCGC Muskegon (WPF-24)

History

United States
- Name: Muskegon
- Namesake: City of Muskegon, Michigan
- Reclassified: PF-24, 15 April 1943
- Builder: Walter Butler Shipbuilders Inc., Superior, Wisconsin
- Laid down: 11 May 1943
- Launched: 25 July 1943
- Sponsored by: Mrs. David Hopkins
- Commissioned: 19 February 1944
- Decommissioned: 15 March 1946
- Fate: Transferred to the Coast Guard, 15 March 1946

History

United States
- Name: Muskegon
- Commissioned: 15 March 1946
- Decommissioned: 27 August 1946
- Stricken: 23 April 1947
- Fate: Sold to the French Navy, 26 March 1947

France
- Name: Mermoz
- Acquired: 26 March 1947
- Reclassified: F714, c. 1952
- Fate: Scrapped in the late 1950s

General characteristics
- Class & type: Tacoma-class frigate
- Displacement: 1,430 long tons (1,453 t) light; 2,415 long tons (2,454 t) full
- Length: 303 ft 11 in (92.63 m)
- Beam: 37 ft 11 in (11.56 m)
- Draft: 13 ft 8 in (4.17 m)
- Propulsion: 2 × 5,500 shp (4,101 kW) turbines; 3 boilers; 2 shafts
- Speed: 20 knots (37 km/h; 23 mph)
- Complement: 190
- Armament: 3 × 3"/50 dual purpose guns (3x1); 4 x 40 mm guns (2×2); 9 × 20 mm guns (9×1); 1 × Hedgehog anti-submarine mortar; 8 × Y-gun depth charge projectors; 2 × Depth charge tracks

USS Muskegon (PF-24), a Tacoma-class frigate, was the first ship of the United States Navy to be named for Muskegon, a city on Michigan's west coast.

== Construction ==
Muskegon (PF-24) was originally authorized as PG-132. Reclassified PF-24 on 15 April 1943, she was laid down on 11 May 1943, under a Maritime Commission contract by Walter Butler Shipbuilders Inc., in Superior, Wisconsin; launched on 25 July 1943, sponsored by Mrs. David Hopkins; acquired by the Navy and commissioned on 19 February 1944.

== Service history ==
=== United States, 1944–1946 ===
After a shakedown cruise to Bermuda, Muskegon proceeded to the Pacific, via New York City and Philadelphia, where she had work done on her engines. Upon reaching Panama, she was ordered back to Boston, Massachusetts, for conversion to a weather ship. Upon completion of conversion, she sailed for NS Argentia, Newfoundland, arriving there on 7 November 1944. She took up station on her first patrol on 20 November.

Serving as plane guard and rescue ship as well as relaying weather data, Muskegon on occasion escorted convoys into Boston, joined in anti-submarine operations, and carried ammunition. In May 1945, she took station in mid-Atlantic to combine weather services with duty as radio and light ship for trans-Atlantic flights, a service which she performed until 15 March 1946. Decommissioned on 15 March, she was transferred to the United States Coast Guard on the same day and was recommissioned as USCG Muskegon (WPF-24). Decommissioned by the Coast Guard on 27 August 1946, she was returned to the Navy.

=== French Navy, 1947–1950s ===
She was sold to the French Navy on 26 March 1947, and struck from the U.S. Naval Vessel Register on 23 April 1947.

Commissioned in the French Navy on 26 March as Mermoz (F-14) and manned by French sailors, the ship actually belonged to the Ministry of Transport and Public Works and was unarmed. Serving as a weather ship, she continued in this role until scrapped in the late 1950s.

== See also ==
- List of Escorteurs of the French Navy
