= USS Shreveport (PF-23) =

Tacoma-class patrol frigate

History

United States
- Name: Shreveport
- Namesake: City of Shreveport, Louisiana
- Builder: Walter Butler Shipbuilders, Inc., Superior, Wisconsin
- Laid down: 8 March 1943
- Launched: 15 July 1943
- Commissioned: 24 April 1944
- Decommissioned: 9 May 1946
- Stricken: 10 June 1946
- Fate: Sold for scrapping, September 1947

General characteristics
- Class & type: Tacoma-class frigate
- Displacement: 1,430 long tons (1,453 t) light; 2,415 long tons (2,454 t) full
- Length: 303 ft 11 in (92.63 m)
- Beam: 37 ft 11 in (11.56 m)
- Draft: 13 ft 8 in (4.17 m)
- Propulsion: 2 × 5,500 shp (4,101 kW) turbines; 3 boilers; 2 shafts
- Speed: 20 knots (37 km/h; 23 mph)
- Complement: 190
- Armament: 3 × 3"/50 dual purpose guns (3x1); 4 x 40 mm guns (2×2); 9 × 20 mm guns (9×1); 1 × Hedgehog anti-submarine mortar; 8 × Y-gun depth charge projectors; 2 × Depth charge tracks

The first USS Shreveport (PG-131/PF-23) was a Tacoma-class frigate of the United States Navy.

She was laid down under Maritime Commission contract (MC hull 1434) on 8 March 1943 by Walter Butler Shipbuilders, Inc., in Superior, Wisconsin; reclassified PF-23 on 15 April 1943; launched on 15 July 1943, sponsored by Miss Nell Querbes; and commissioned on 24 April 1944 at Algiers, Louisiana.

== Service history ==
Following shakedown off Bermuda, Shreveport arrived at Boston, Massachusetts, on 9 November 1944. Conversion to a weather ship followed (the after 3-inch gun was removed and a weather balloon hangar was added); and on 2 March 1945, she departed Boston and headed north to assume weather reporting and aircraft lifeguard duties in the North Atlantic.

Operating on stations between Newfoundland and Iceland, she completed her North Atlantic service in the fall and moved south, to Recife, Brazil, whence she conducted similar patrols from December 1945 until March 1946. She sailed for the United States on 8 March; was transferred to the operational control of the Coast Guard while en route; arrived at Boston on the 23rd; then, steamed to Charleston, South Carolina, for inactivation.

Shreveport was decommissioned on 9 May 1946; struck from the Navy list on 10 June; and sold for scrapping to the Sun Shipbuilding and Drydock Company, Chester, Pennsylvania, in September 1947.
