= USS Sheboygan =

Tacoma-class patrol frigate

USS Sheboygan Luitenant ter zee Victor Billet
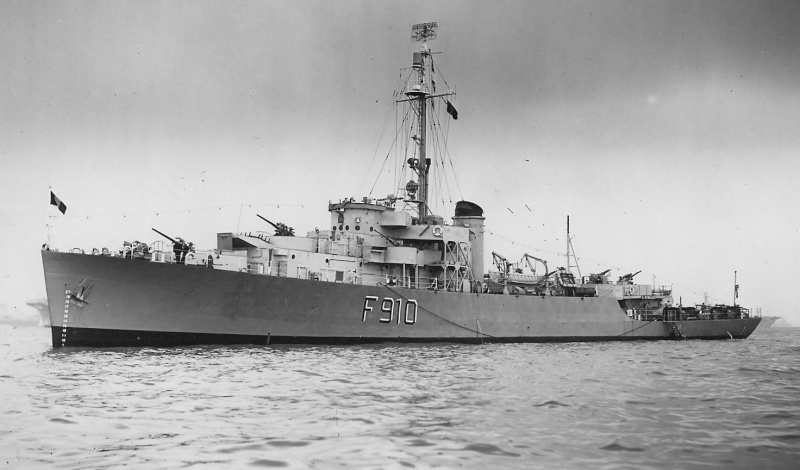
- Luitenant ter zee Victor Billet in Belgian service

History

United States
- Name: Sheboygan
- Namesake: City of Sheboygan, Wisconsin
- Builder: Globe Shipbuilding Company, Superior, Wisconsin
- Laid down: 17 April 1943
- Launched: 31 July 1943
- Commissioned: 26 May 1944
- Decommissioned: 1 June 1944
- Recommissioned: 14 October 1944
- Decommissioned: 9 August 1946
- Identification: PF-57
- Fate: Sold to Belgium, 19 March 1947

Belgium
- Name: Luitenant ter zee Victor Billet
- Acquired: 19 March 1947
- Stricken: 1957
- Identification: F 910
- Fate: Converted to training hulk, 1958; Scrapped, 1959

General characteristics
- Class & type: Tacoma-class frigate
- Displacement: 1,264 long tons (1,284 t)
- Length: 303 ft 11 in (92.63 m)
- Beam: 37 ft 6 in (11.43 m)
- Draft: 13 ft 8 in (4.17 m)
- Propulsion: 2 × 5,500 shp (4,101 kW) turbines; 3 boilers; 2 shafts
- Speed: 20 knots (37 km/h; 23 mph)
- Complement: 190
- Armament: 3 × 3"/50 dual purpose guns (3x1); 4 x 40 mm guns (2×2); 9 × 20 mm guns (9×1); 1 × Hedgehog anti-submarine mortar; 8 × Y-gun depth charge projectors; 2 × Depth charge tracks

USS Sheboygan (PF-57) was a Tacoma-class frigate of the United States Navy which was later transferred to the Belgian Navy as Lieutenant ter zee Victor Billet.

== Construction ==
Sheboygan was laid down on 17 April 1943, under a Maritime Commission contract by the Globe Shipbuilding Company at Superior, Wisconsin; sponsored by Mrs. Willard M. Sonnenburg; and placed in reduced commission at New Orleans, Louisiana, on 26 May 1944, with Lieutenant Commander A. J. Carpenter, USCG, in command. It is the only ship of the United States Navy to be named for Sheboygan, Wisconsin.

== Service history ==
Ordered to Tampa, Florida, for conversion to a weather patrol ship, Sheboygan was decommissioned on 1 June. On 14 October 1944, she was recommissioned. Shakedown in Bermuda followed; and on 21 February, the frigate arrived at NS Argentia, Newfoundland, for weather patrol duty.

As a Navy ship, she performed weather and plane guard patrols in the North Atlantic, broken by periods of upkeep in Naval Station Argentia, and Boston, Massachusetts, until transferred to the United States Coast Guard on 14 March 1946. Her work in the North Atlantic, however, continued until she was decommissioned on 9 August 1946.

She was sold on 19 March 1947 to Belgium and served in the Belgian Navy as Luitenant ter zee Victor Billet until converted to a stationary training hulk in 1958, and was scrapped in 1959.
