= USS Covington (PF-56) =

Tacoma-class patrol frigate

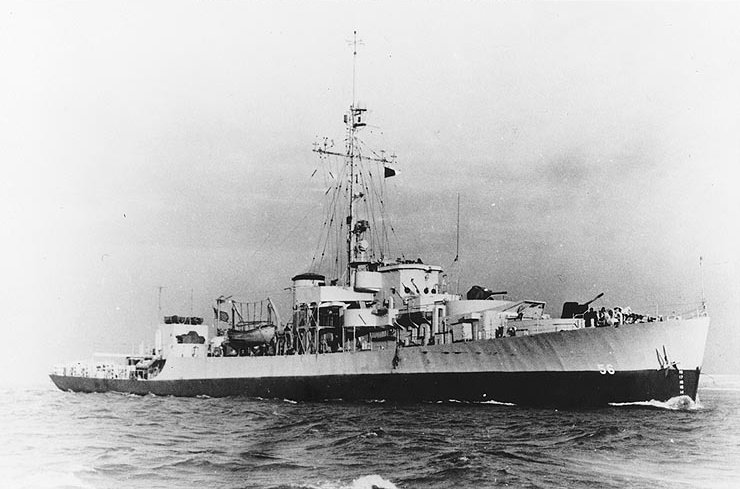
- USS Covington (PF-56)

History

United States
- Name: Covington
- Namesake: City of Convington, Kentucky
- Builder: Globe Shipbuilding Company, Superior, Wisconsin
- Laid down: 1 March 1943
- Launched: 15 July 1943
- Commissioned: 17 October 1944
- Decommissioned: 16 March 1946
- Fate: loaned to US Coast Guard, 16 March 1946
- Acquired: returned from US Coast Guard, 17 September 1946
- Stricken: April 1947
- Fate: Sold to Ecuador, 28 August 1947

United States
- Name: Covington
- Commissioned: 16 March 1946
- Decommissioned: 17 September 1946
- Fate: Returned to US Navy, 17 September 1946

Ecuador
- Name: Guayas
- Acquired: 28 August 1947
- Decommissioned: 1972
- Stricken: 1974

General characteristics
- Class & type: Tacoma-class frigate
- Displacement: 1,430 long tons (1,453 t) light; 2,415 long tons (2,454 t) full
- Length: 303 ft 11 in (92.63 m)
- Beam: 37 ft 6 in (11.43 m)
- Draft: 13 ft 8 in (4.17 m)
- Propulsion: 2 × 5,500 shp (4,101 kW) turbines; 3 boilers; 2 shafts
- Speed: 20 knots (37 km/h; 23 mph)
- Complement: 190
- Armament: 3 × 3"/50 dual purpose guns (3x1); 4 x 40 mm guns (2×2); 9 × 20 mm guns (9×1); 1 × Hedgehog anti-submarine mortar; 8 × Y-gun depth charge projectors; 2 × Depth charge tracks

USS Covington (PF-56), a Tacoma-class frigate, was the third ship of the United States Navy to be named for Covington, Kentucky. Covington, with a United States Coast Guard crew, served as a weather ship off Newfoundland through early 1946. She was decommissioned in April 1946 and turned over to the U.S. Coast Guard and commissioned the same day as USCGC Covington (PF-56) and remained in service through September. She was returned to the U.S. Navy at that time and placed in reserve. In April 1947, she was struck from the Naval Vessel Register and, in August, sold to the Ecuadorian Navy. As BAE Guayas (E-21), she served as the flagship of the Ecuadorian Navy from her acquisition through 1967. She was decommissioned in 1972 and stricken in 1974.

== Construction ==
Covington (PF-56) was launched on 15 July 1943, by Globe Shipbuilding Company., Superior, Wisconsin, under a Maritime Commission contract; sponsored by Miss. J. Phillips; transferred to the Navy on 5 August 1944; placed in "ferry" commission on 7 August 1944; and commissioned in full on 17 October 1944.

== Service history ==
Covington arrived at NS Argentia, Newfoundland, on 25 December 1944, for duty as a weather patrol vessel. She remained on this duty, except for overhauls at Boston and Charleston, South Carolina, until 16 March 1946, when she was decommissioned and loaned to the Coast Guard. Covington was returned from the Coast Guard on 17 September 1946, and sold to Ecuador through the Foreign Liquidation Commission of the State Department on 28 August 1947. Covington was renamed BAE Guayas (E-21) and served as the flagship of the Ecuadorian Navy until 1967, when she was replaced in that duty by 25 de Julio (the former U.S. Navy destroyer escort USS Enright (DE-216)). Guayas was decommissioned in 1972 and stricken in 1974.
