= USS Beaufort (PF-59) =

Tacoma-class patrol frigate

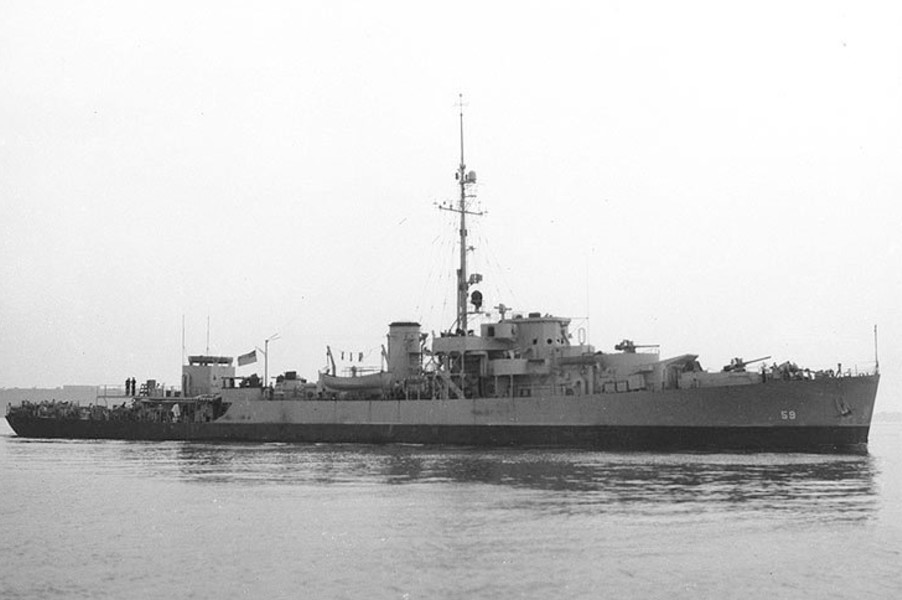
- USS Beaufort (PF-59)

History

United States
- Name: Beaufort
- Namesake: City of Beaufort, South Carolina
- Ordered: As "patrol gunboat," PG-167, MC Type T. S2-S2-AQ1, (MC hull 1466)
- Reclassified: "Patrol frigate," PF-59, 15 April 1943
- Builder: Globe Shipbuilding Company, Superior, Wisconsin
- Laid down: 21 July 1943
- Launched: 9 October 1943
- Sponsored by: Mrs. Elma G. Rodgers
- In service: 20 July 1944
- Out of service: 29 July 1944
- Commissioned: 28 August 1944 as USS Beaufort (PF-59)
- Refit: Converted to a weather station ship at the Boston Navy Yard
- Decommissioned: 19 April 1946 at Norfolk, Virginia
- Stricken: 21 May 1946
- Fate: Scrapped, 11 April 1947

General characteristics
- Class & type: Tacoma-class frigate
- Displacement: 1,430 long tons (1,453 t)
- Length: 303 ft 11 in (92.63 m)
- Beam: 37 ft 6 in (11.43 m)
- Draft: 13 ft 8 in (4.17 m)
- Propulsion: two 3-drum express boilers, two 5,500 ihp J. Hendy Iron Works engines, two shafts
- Speed: 20.3 knots (37.6 km/h; 23.4 mph)
- Complement: 176 officers and enlisted
- Armament: 2 × 3"/50 dual purpose guns (2x1); 4 x 40 mm guns (2×2); 9 × 20 mm guns (9×1); 1 × Hedgehog anti-submarine mortar; 8 × Y-gun depth charge projectors; 2 × Depth charge tracks
- Notes: weather balloon hangar located aft

USS Beaufort (PF-59) was a Tacoma-class frigate acquired by the United States Navy during World War II. Although she was designed as a patrol craft, she was reconfigured and employed as a weather station ship in the North Atlantic Ocean. Beaufort's task was to launch weather balloons and transmit weather data via radio to her shore-based commanders.

== Constructed in Superior, Wisconsin ==
The third U.S. Navy ship to be so named, Beaufort (PF-59) laid down on 21 July 1943, at Superior, Wisconsin, by the Globe Shipbuilding Co. under a U.S. Maritime Commission contract (MC hull 1466); launched on 9 October 1943; sponsored by Mrs. Elma G. Rodgers; accepted by the Navy on 8 July 1944.

== In-service ==
Beaufort was placed in service for the trip to Boston, Massachusetts; arrived at Boston on 20 July 1944; placed out of service on 29 July 1944; converted to a weather station ship at the Boston Navy Yard; and commissioned on 28 August 1944.

== World War II service ==
During the following week, Beaufort completed fitting out. On 8 September, she got underway for a shakedown cruise to Bermuda.

The ship arrived back at Boston on 6 October. After a nine-day repair period, the patrol frigate headed for Hussey Sound – near Portland, Maine – for five days of training before returning to Boston. Soon thereafter, she sailed for Argentia, Newfoundland. During the remainder of World War II and for some seven months thereafter, she operated out of Argentia as a weather station ship with additional duty as a plane guard and air-sea rescue ship.

== Under Coast Guard cognizance ==
In March 1946, she was temporarily assigned to the U.S. Coast Guard pending inactivation. Beaufort reported to the Commandant, 5th Naval District, on 28 March 1946 and was decommissioned at Norfolk, Virginia, on 19 April 1946.

== Post-war dispositioning ==
Her name was struck from the Navy List on 21 May 1946, and she was sold to the Sun Shipbuilding & Drydock Company, Chester, Pennsylvania, on 11 April 1947 for scrapping.
