= USS Abilene =

United States Navy ship

History

United States
- Name: Abilene
- Namesake: City of Abilene, Kansas
- Builder: Globe Shipbuilding Company, Superior, Wisconsin
- Laid down: 6 May 1943
- Launched: 21 August 1943
- Commissioned: 28 October 1944
- Decommissioned: 21 August 1946
- Stricken: 13 November 1946
- Fate: Sold, 5 May 1947

Netherlands
- Name: HNLMS Cirrus
- Acquired: 5 May 1947
- Fate: Scrapped, 1969

General characteristics
- Class & type: Tacoma-class frigate
- Type: S2-S2-AQ1
- Displacement: 1,430 long tons (1,450 t) (standard load); 2,100 long tons (2,100 t) (full load)
- Length: 303 ft 11 in (92.63 m)
- Beam: 37 ft 6 in (11.43 m)
- Draft: 13 ft 8 in (4.17 m)
- Installed power: 2 × 3–drum Express boilers; 11,000 indicated horsepower (8,200 kW)
- Propulsion: 2 × Valley Iron Works engines; 2 × shafts
- Speed: 20.3 kn (37.6 km/h; 23.4 mph)
- Complement: 190
- Armament: 2 × 3 in (76 mm) caliber guns; 2 × twin 40 mm Bofors guns; 9 × 20 mm Oerlikon cannons; 8 × Y-gun depth charge projectors; 2 × Depth charge tracks

USS Abilene (PF-58), a Tacoma-class frigate, was in the service of the United States Navy, named after the city of Abilene, Kansas.

== Construction ==
She was laid down on 6 May 1943 as Bridgeport, Maritime Commission (MARCOM) hull 1465, and originally classified as patrol gunboat, PG-166, on 6 May 1943, at the Globe Shipbuilding Company in Superior, Wisconsin. She was launched on 21 August 1943, sponsored by Mrs. Thomas F. Rogers; acquired by the Navy on 31 May 1944; renamed Abilene, reclassified a patrol frigate, and assigned hull number PF-58 on 28 June 1944; and commissioned on 28 October 1944 with Lieutenant Commander Chester I. Steel, USCG, in command.

== Service history ==
Following shakedown at Bermuda, Abilene steamed to NS Argentina, Newfoundland, where she joined the North Atlantic Weather Patrol. She operated on this station through May 1945, conducting weather observations and rendering navigational assistance to airplanes.

After a brief period of upkeep at Boston, Massachusetts, Abilene assumed air-sea rescue duties in the Atlantic in June 1945. As a member of Task Group 24.5, the patrol vessel collected weather data while serving as a plane guard along the air routes between Europe and the United States.

== Decommissioning ==
Abilene was decommissioned at New Orleans, Louisiana, on 21 August 1946. Her name was struck from the Navy list on 13 November 1946. The ship was sold to the government of the Netherlands on 5 May 1947.

The ship was renamed Cirrus, and eventually scrapped in 1969.

== Notes ==
Citations

== Bibliography ==
Online resources

- "Abilene (PF-58)". Dictionary of American Naval Fighting Ships. Naval History and Heritage Command. 30 August 2016. This article incorporates text from this source, which is in the public domain.
- "Globe Shipbuilding, Superior WI". ShipbuildingHistory.com. 28 June 2010.
- "USS Abilene (PF-58)". NavSource.
