= Superior Public Library =

Public library in Wisconsin, United States

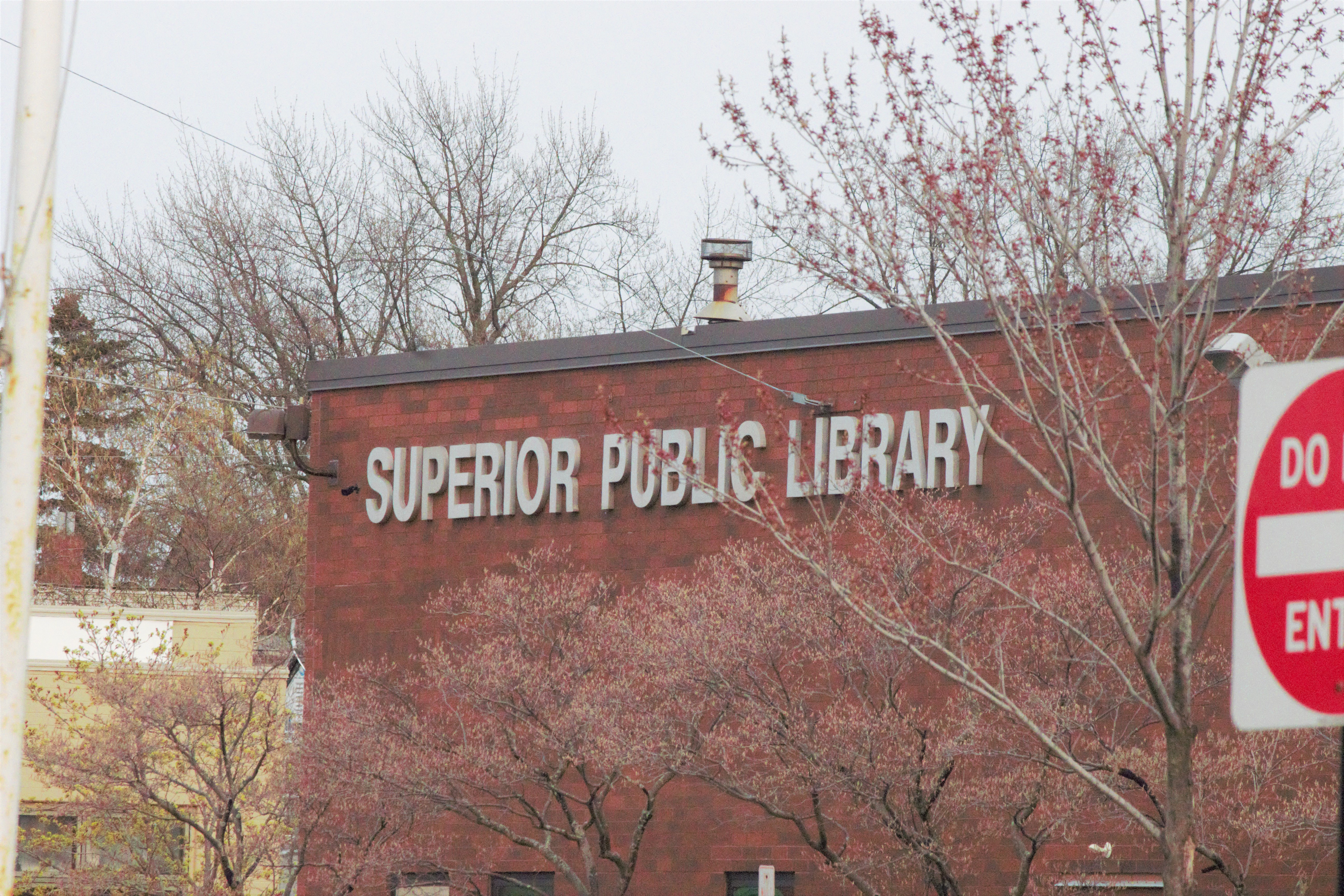
- Location: Superior, Wisconsin, United States
- Branches: 3

Other information
- Director: Sue Heskin
- Public transit access: DTA (Superior Branch)
- Website: Official website

Superior Public Library is located in Superior, Wisconsin. The library was founded in 1888 and serves as the public library for Douglas County, Wisconsin. The library is part of the Merlin Library Automation Consortium and the eight-county Northern Waters Library Service of Northern Wisconsin. It is also an Area Research Center for the Wisconsin Historical Society's archival network.

== Services ==
The collection features books and magazines including books on CD and large print books. Patrons can check out music CDs, videos, and DVDs. Telephone and walk-in reference service is available and the library also has meeting rooms. Computers and Internet access are available as well as photocopiers and a typewriter. There is a microfilm collection including pre-1907 naturalization records, old censuses, vital records, and other historical documents. Programs for both children and adults are also available.

== Branches ==
The library has three branches. They are the Superior Public Library in Superior, the Joan Salmen Memorial Library in Solon Springs, and the Imogene McGrath Memorial Library in Lake Nebagamon.

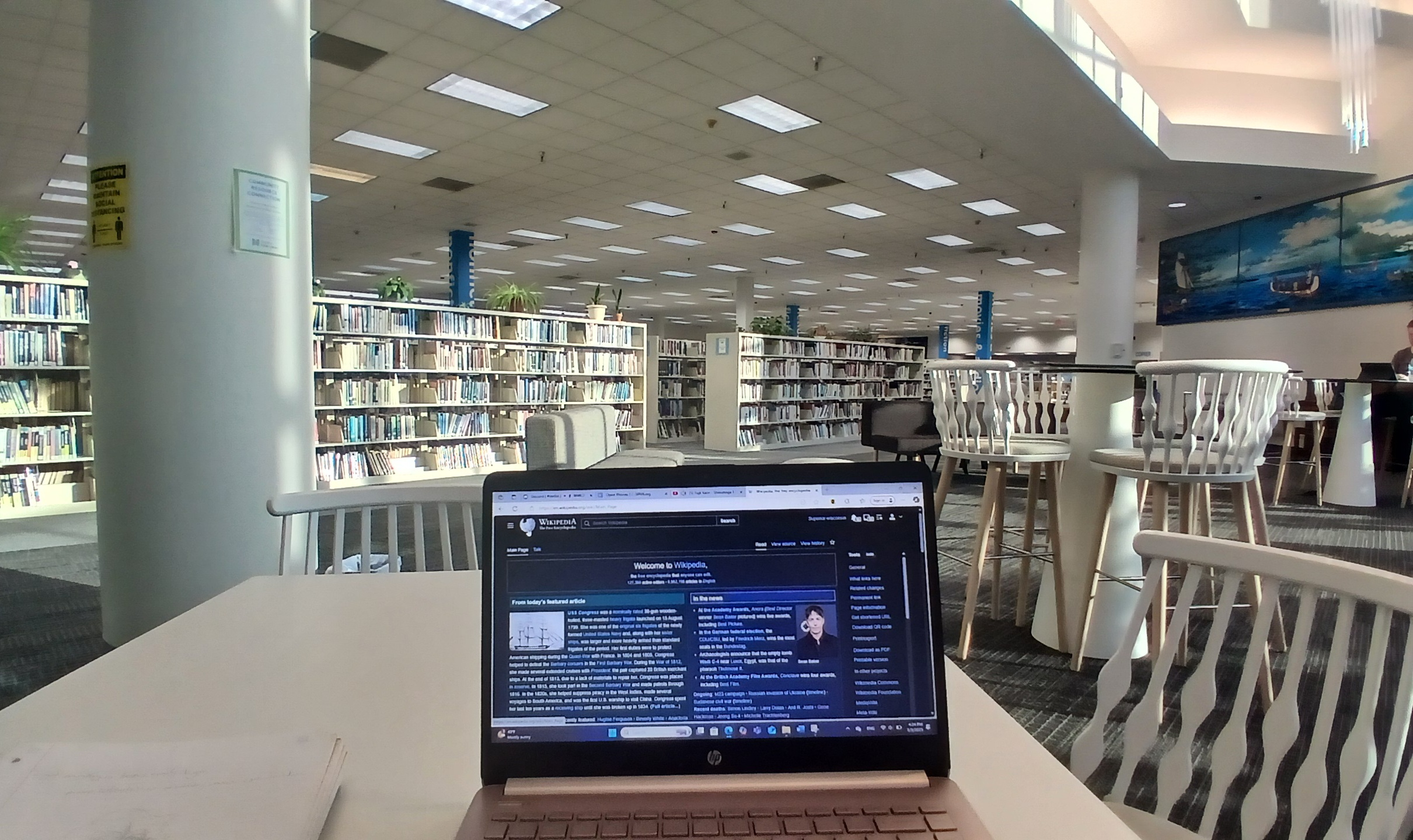
Inside view of the Superior Public Library in March 2025.
