= USS Hennepin =

Cargo ship of the United States Navy

History

United States
- Name: Hennepin
- Namesake: Hennepin County, Minnesota
- Ordered: as type (C1-M-AV1) hull, MC hull 2118
- Builder: Walter Butler Shipbuilders, Inc., Superior, Wisconsin
- Yard number: 36
- Laid down: 29 December 1943
- Launched: 27 June 1944
- Sponsored by: Mrs. F. P. Heffelfinger
- Acquired: 7 June 1945
- Commissioned: 3 July 1945
- Decommissioned: 16 February 1946
- Stricken: 5 June 1946
- Identification: Hull symbol: AK-187; Code letters: NENJ
- Fate: placed in service with Military Sea Transportation Service (MSTS), 1 July 1950
- Notes: used by the U.S. Army in Japan as USAT Hennepin (1946–1950)

History

United States
- Name: Hennepin
- Operator: Military Sea Transportation Service
- In service: 1 July 1950
- Out of service: 16 July 1958
- Identification: Hull symbol: T-AK-187
- Honors and awards: 1 × battle star for Korean War service
- Fate: returned to the U.S. Maritime Administration, 27 March 1959 and scrapped 1960

General characteristics
- Class & type: Alamosa-class cargo ship
- Type: C1-M-AV1
- Tonnage: 5,032 long tons deadweight (DWT)
- Displacement: 2,382 long tons (2,420 t) (standard); 7,450 long tons (7,570 t) (full load)
- Length: 388 ft 8 in (118.47 m)
- Beam: 50 ft (15 m)
- Draft: 21 ft 1 in (6.43 m)
- Installed power: 1 × Nordberg, TSM 6 diesel engine; 1,750 shp (1,300 kW)
- Propulsion: 1 × propeller
- Speed: 11.5 kn (21.3 km/h; 13.2 mph)
- Capacity: 3,945 t (3,883 long tons) DWT; 9,830 cu ft (278 m^{3}) (refrigerated); 227,730 cu ft (6,449 m^{3}) (non-refrigerated)
- Complement: 15 Officers; 70 Enlisted
- Armament: 1 × 3 in (76 mm)/50 caliber dual purpose gun (DP); 6 × 20 mm (0.8 in) Oerlikon anti-aircraft (AA) cannons

USS Hennepin (AK-187) was an Alamosa-class cargo ship that served the US Navy during the final months of World War II. Post-war she served briefly with the US Army as USAT Hennepin, and then as USNS Hennepin (T-AK-187) with the Military Sea Transportation Service (MSTS) where she was awarded a battle star. She was declared excess-to-needs on 27 March 1959.

== Construction ==
Hennepin was laid down under U.S. Maritime Commission contract, MC hull 2118, by Walter Butler Shipbuilders, Inc., Superior, Wisconsin, 29 December 1943; launched 27 June 1944; sponsored by Mrs. F. P. Heffelflnger; acquired by the Navy 7 June 1945; and commissioned 3 July 1945, at Galveston, Texas.

== Service history ==
=== World War II-related service ===
After shakedown in the Gulf of Mexico, Hennepin departed Galveston 22 July to load cargo at Gulfport, Mississippi, and New Orleans, Louisiana. She departed New Orleans 6 August, steamed via the Panama Canal and the Marshall Islands, and arrived Cebu, Philippines, 23 September. Assigned to Service Squadron 8, she operated in the Philippines until 19 November when she departed Tacloban, Leyte, for Australia.

During the next month she loaded cargo at Melbourne, Sydney, and Brisbane before sailing 17 December with provisions for occupation troops in Korea. Steaming via Okinawa, she reached Jinsen 7 January 1946; then sailed for Japan 25 January. She arrived Yokosuka on 30 January, was decommissioned 16 February, and transferred to the US Army.

=== US Army service ===
Hennepin was operated by the US Army for the Supreme Commander of Allied Forces in Japan until 1 July 1950 when she was reacquired by the Navy. After refitting at Mitsubishi Shipyard, Kobe, Japan, she was assigned to the MSTS 28 February 1951 and designated T-AK 187.

=== Korean War support ===
Crewed by civilians, she participated in the Korean supply run during the American effort to repel Communist aggression in South Korea. Operating primarily out of Moji and Sasebo, Japan, she transported vital military cargo to American-held Korean ports during the remainder of the Korean War.

== Post-Korean War support ==
Following the 1953 Armistice in Korea, Hennepin continued supply runs between Japan and South Korea. In response to the scheduled transfer of North Vietnam to Communist control, she departed Yokohama 30 August 1954 to provide support for Operation Passage to Freedom. She arrived Haiphong, North Vietnam, 7 September, and for more than 3 months she transported cargo southward to St. Jacques and Saigon. After completing three runs to Saigon, she departed St. Jacques for Japan 22 December and arrived Sasebo 3 January 1955.

Between 1955 and 1958 Hennepin remained in the Far East, supporting America's determination to keep the peace and contain Communism in Asia. She continued to operate primarily between Japanese and South Korean ports, but cargo runs in 1957 and 1958 again sent her to Southeast Asia.

Between 13 May and 3 July 1957 she operated out of Saigon and Bangkok, Thailand, and in addition steamed to Karachi, Pakistan, and Bahrain Island in the Persian Gulf. During September 1957 and April 1958 she steamed out of Yokohama, carrying cargo to Saigon.

=== Final deactivation ===
After returning to Yokohama from Pusan, Korea, 21 June 1958, it was inactivated by the Navy 16 July. It transferred to the Maritime Administration 27 March 1959, and scrapped in 1960.

== Honors and awards ==
Hennepin received one battle star for Korean War service.

== Notes ==
Citations

== Bibliography ==
Online resources

- "Hennepin (AK-187)". Dictionary of American Naval Fighting Ships. Naval History and Heritage Command. This article incorporates text from this source, which is in the public domain.
- "C1 Cargo Ships". ShipbuildingHistory.com. 28 August 2009.
- "USS Hennepin (AK-187)". NavSource. 18 April 2014.
- "Hennepin (AK-187)". United States Department of Transportation. Archived from the original on 18 November 2016.
