= USS Manitowoc (PF-61) =

Tacoma-class patrol frigate

History

United States
- Name: Manitowoc
- Namesake: City of Manitowoc, Wisconsin
- Reclassified: PF-61, 15 April 1943
- Builder: Globe Shipbuilding Company, Superior, Wisconsin
- Laid down: 26 August 1943
- Launched: 30 November 1943
- Sponsored by: Mrs. Martin Georgenson
- Commissioned: 5 December 1944
- Decommissioned: 14 March 1946
- Fate: Transferred to US Coast Guard, 14 March 1946

History

United States
- Name: Manitowoc
- Commissioned: 14 March 1946
- Decommissioned: 3 September 1946
- Fate: Sold to France, 25 March 1947

History

France
- Name: Le Brix
- Namesake: Joseph Le Brix
- Acquired: 25 March 1947
- Reclassified: F715, c. 1952
- Fate: Scrapped, 1958

General characteristics
- Class & type: Tacoma-class frigate
- Displacement: 1,264 long tons (1,284 t)
- Length: 303 ft 11 in (92.63 m)
- Beam: 37 ft 6 in (11.43 m)
- Draft: 13 ft 8 in (4.17 m)
- Propulsion: 2 × 5,500 shp (4,101 kW) turbines; 3 boilers; 2 shafts
- Speed: 20 knots (37 km/h; 23 mph)
- Complement: 190
- Armament: 3 × 3"/50 dual purpose guns (3x1); 4 x 40 mm guns (2×2); 9 × 20 mm guns (9×1); 1 × Hedgehog anti-submarine mortar; 8 × Y-gun depth charge projectors; 2 × Depth charge tracks

USS Manitowoc (PF-61), a Tacoma-class frigate in commission from 1944 to, was the first ship of the United States Navy to be named for Manitowoc, Wisconsin. After commissioned service in the U.S. Navy from 1944 to 1946. After her Navy service, she served in the United States Coast Guard for a few months in 1946. Sold to France in 1947, she commissioned into service in the French Navy as Le Brix (F715) in 1948 and operated as a weather ship until scrapped in 1958.

== Construction and commissioning ==
Originally designated as a patrol gunboat, PG-169, Manitowoc was reclassified as a patrol frigate, PF-61, on 15 April 1943, and laid down under a Maritime Commission contract by the Globe Shipbuilding Company in Superior, Wisconsin, on 26 August 1943; launched on 30 November 1943, sponsored by Mrs. Martin Georgenson; and delivered to the Maritime Commission on 27 September 1944. She was then ferried to New Orleans, Louisiana via the Chicago Sanitary and Ship Canal and the Mississippi River for acquisition by the US Navy. She was commissioned on 24 October 1944.

== Service history ==
=== United States Navy service, 1944–1945 ===
==== World War II, 1944–1945 ====
Between 29 October and 5 November 1944, Manitowoc steamed to Boston, Massachusetts, where she was placed out of service on 8 November and converted by the Boston Navy Yard for use as a weather patrol ship. She was then recommissioned at Boston on 5 December, with Lieutenant Commander J. A. Martin USCG commanding and underwent shakedown off Bermuda during late December 1944 and early January 1945. After returning to Boston on 20 January 1945, she joined Escort Division 34 for duty as a weather ship in the North Atlantic.

Departing Boston on 2 February, she reached NS Argentia, Newfoundland on 5 February and the following day undertook her first weather patrol. She relieved the Woonsocket (PF-32) on 8 February and began patrolling her assigned station. Equipped with specialized radio transmitters and meteorological equipment, she spent two weeks transmitting valuable weather data as the Allies began their final push to defeat Nazi Germany. She was relieved on 24 February, returning to Argentia by 26 February.

Before the end of the war in Europe, the Manitowoc made two further weather patrols in the North Atlantic, carrying her from Newfoundland as far east as Iceland. She also helped deter the remnants of the Kriegsmarine submarine fleet from action by patrolling the sea lanes in her area.

==== Post-war operations, 1945–1946 ====
After the end of the war in Europe, Manitowoc continued to patrol the North Atlantic, serving primarily as an air-sea rescue ship. Between 29 May 1945 and 10 February 1946 she completed seven such patrols. During a patrol in late July, she provided medical aid for the Panamanian merchantman SS Yemasee and on 2 August her medical officer performed an emergency appendectomy on a crewman from the Swedish merchant ship SS San Francisco.

Manitowoc returned from her final patrol on 10 February 1946 and was decommissioned at Boston on 14 March 1946.

=== United States Coast Guard service, 1946 ===
Manitowoc was loaned to and immediately recommissioned by the United States Coast Guard on the day of her Navy decommissioning with Lieutenant Wesly L. Saunders, USCG, commanding. She then served as a Coast Guard vessel for the next five months, based at Norfolk, Virginia, and New Orleans. The Coast Guard decommissioned her on 3 September 1946.

=== French Navy service. 1947–1958 ===
Manitowoc was sold to France on 25 March 1947. After delivery to a representative of the French government, she was commissioned in the French Navy as Le Brix (F715) and served under the French flag as a weather ship until scrapped in 1958.

== See also ==
- List of Escorteurs of the French Navy
