= USS Enright =

Buckley-class destroyer escort

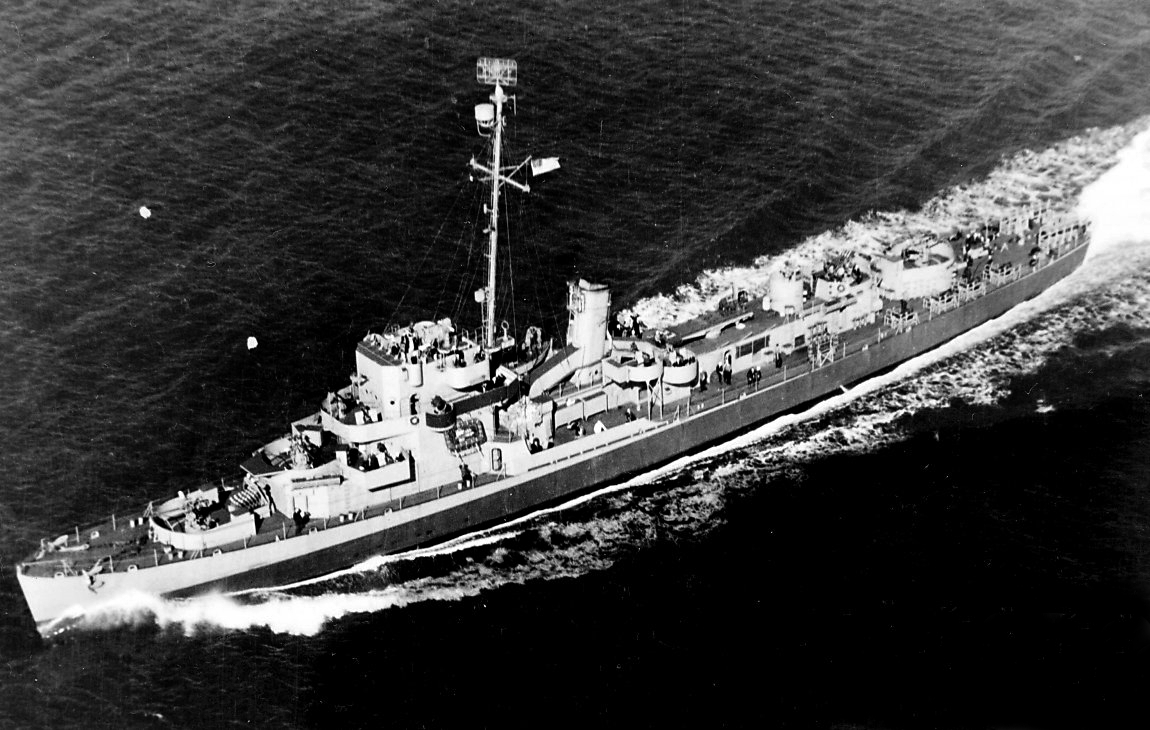

History

United States
- Name: USS Enright (DE-216)
- Namesake: Robert Paul Francis Enright
- Ordered: 1942
- Builder: Philadelphia Navy Yard, Philadelphia
- Laid down: 22 February 1943
- Launched: 29 May 1943
- Commissioned: 21 September 1943
- Reclassified: APD-66, 21 January 1945
- Decommissioned: 21 June 1946
- Honors and awards: 1 battle star (World War II)
- Fate: Transferred to Ecuador 14 July 1967
- Stricken: 31 March 1978

History

Ecuador
- Name: BAE 25 de Julio (E-12)
- Namesake: 25 July 1851, Emancipation Day in Ecuador
- Acquired: 14 July 1967
- Renamed: BAE Morán Valverde (D-01), 1975
- Namesake: Rafael Morán Valverde
- Stricken: 1989
- Fate: Scrapped, 1989

General characteristics
- Class & type: Buckley-class destroyer escort
- Displacement: 1,400 long tons (1,422 t) standard; 1,740 long tons (1,768 t) full load
- Length: 306 ft (93 m)
- Beam: 37 ft (11 m)
- Draft: 9 ft 6 in (2.90 m) standard; 11 ft 3 in (3.43 m) full load
- Propulsion: 2 × boilers; General Electric turbo-electric drive; 12,000 shp (8.9 MW); 2 × solid manganese-bronze 3,600 lb (1,600 kg) 3-bladed propellers, 8 ft 6 in (2.59 m) diameter, 7 ft 7 in (2.31 m) pitch; 2 × rudders; 359 tons fuel oil
- Speed: 23 knots (43 km/h; 26 mph)
- Range: 3,700 nmi (6,900 km) at 15 kn (28 km/h; 17 mph); 6,000 nmi (11,000 km) at 12 kn (22 km/h; 14 mph)
- Complement: 15 officers, 198 men
- Armament: 3 × 3"/50 caliber guns; 1 × quad 1.1"/75 caliber gun; 8 × single 20 mm guns; 1 × triple 21 inch (533 mm) torpedo tubes; 1 × Hedgehog anti-submarine mortar; 8 × K-gun depth charge projectors; 2 × depth charge tracks

USS Enright (DE-216/APD-66) was a Buckley-class destroyer escort in service with the United States Navy from 1943 to 1946. In 1967, she was transferred to Ecuador where she served until she was scrapped in 1989.

== History ==
=== United States Navy (1943–1967) ===
Enright was named in honor of Ensign Robert Paul Francis Enright (1916–1942), who was killed in action while serving aboard the destroyer Hammann (DD-412) during the Battle of Midway on 6 June 1942. The ship was launched on 29 May 1943 by Philadelphia Navy Yard; sponsored by Mrs. Katherine L. Enright, mother of Ensign Enright; and commissioned on 21 September 1943.

Enright made two voyages from east coast ports to escort convoys to NS Argentia, Newfoundland, between 15 November and 9 December 1943, then took up demanding duty escorting convoys across the North Atlantic. During the next year, she made six voyages to British ports, guarding the passage of men and supplies destined for the vast operations on the European continent, and one voyage to Oran.

On 16 April 1944, while westward bound, Enright was struck by a merchantman ship approaching the convoy. A 65-foot hole was torn in her port quarter, forward living spaces were flooded, and she took on a 9° list. The high quality of her crew was shown both in damage control work and the seamanship which brought her safely back to New York, where she was repaired in a month.

She was reclassified APD-66 on 21 January 1945. Converted to a Charles Lawrence-class high speed transport at Boston Navy Yard early in 1945, Enright sailed from Norfolk, Virginia on 7 April for Pacific duty. She trained at Pearl Harbor for two weeks, then escorted a convoy to Eniwetok and Ulithi, continuing until she arrived off Okinawa on 11 June 1945. Aside from a two-week absence in July to escort a convoy from Leyte Island in the Philippines to Okinawa, Enright served in the anti-submarine screen around Okinawa until 24 July. For the next month, she carried mail among southern Philippines, and to Brunei Bay, Borneo.

Enright cleared Leyte Gulf on 21 August 1945, to escort a supply convoy to a rendezvous off Tokyo Bay, then returned to Manila to begin a series of voyages escorting transports and carrying troops herself to the occupation of Japan and China. On 2 December 1945, she sailed from Manila for Norfolk, arriving 11 January 1946.

She was decommissioned and placed in reserve at Green Cove Springs, Florida, 21 June 1946.

=== Ecuadorian Navy (1967–1989) ===
Enright was transferred to Ecuador on 14 July 1967 and was renamed escort destroyer BAE 25 de Julio (E-12). The ship was renamed and reclassified as frigate BAE Morán Valverde (D-01) in 1975 and was purchased outright by Ecuador on 30 August 1978. She was stricken from the United States Naval Vessel Register on 31 March 1978. The ship was deleted in 1989.

== Awards ==
Enright received one battle star for World War II service.
