= USS Nicollet =

Cargo ship of the United States Navy

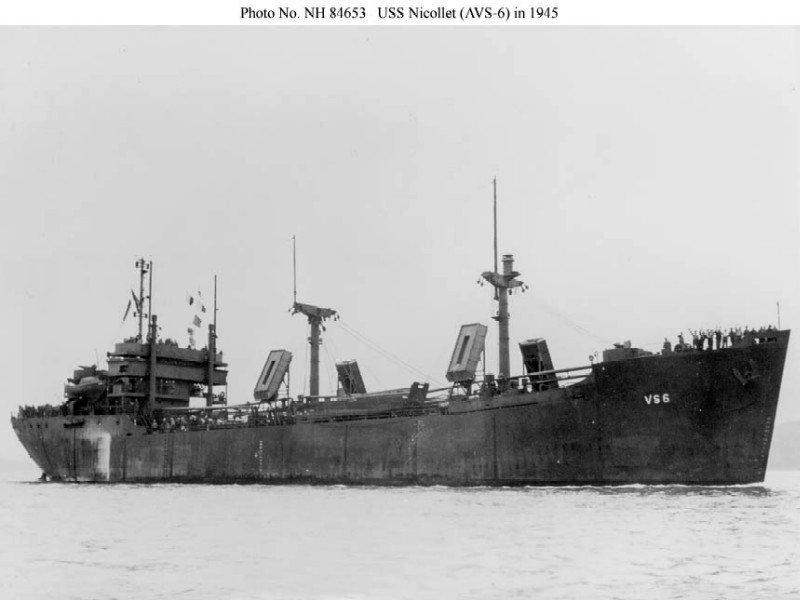
- USS Nicollet (AVS-6), probably photographed underway in San Francisco Bay, California, in 1945

History

United States
- Name: Nicollet
- Namesake: Nicollet County, Minnesota
- Ordered: as type (C1-M-AV1) hull, MC hull 2153
- Builder: Globe Shipbuilding Company, Superior, Wisconsin
- Yard number: 120
- Laid down: 9 February 1944
- Launched: 31 July 1944
- Sponsored by: Mrs. F.C. Hanson
- Completed: 21 November 1944
- Acquired: 12 March 1945
- Commissioned: 27 April 1945
- Decommissioned: 17 June 1946
- Reclassified: Miscellaneous Auxiliary (AG), 12 March 1945; Aviation Stores Issue Ship (AVS), 25 May 1945
- Refit: Gwinnett-class Aviation Stores Issue Ship, at Port Houston Iron Works, Houston, Texas, 12 March 1945
- Stricken: 3 July 1946
- Identification: Hull symbol: AK-199; Hull symbol: AG-93; Hull symbol: AVS-6; Code letters: NEOQ
- Fate: Laid up in Suisun Bay Reserve Fleet, 17 June 1946, sold, 30 June 1947

Republic of France
- Name: Djerada
- Acquired: 30 June 1947
- Fate: Sold, 1959

Morocco
- Name: Djerada
- Fate: Scrapped in Spain, February 1970

General characteristics
- Class & type: Alamosa-class cargo ship (1944–1945); Gwinnett-class aviation stores issue ship (1945–1946)
- Type: C1-M-AV1
- Tonnage: 5,032 LT DWT
- Displacement: 2,382 long tons (2,420 t) (standard); 7,450 long tons (7,570 t) (full load)
- Length: 388 ft 8 in (118.47 m)
- Beam: 50 ft (15 m)
- Draft: 21 ft 1 in (6.43 m)
- Installed power: 1 × Nordberg, TSM 6 diesel engine; 1,750 shp (1,300 kW)
- Propulsion: 1 × propeller
- Speed: 11.5 kn (21.3 km/h; 13.2 mph)
- Capacity: 3,945 t (3,883 long tons) DWT; 9,830 cu ft (278 m^{3}) (refrigerated); 227,730 cu ft (6,449 m^{3}) (non-refrigerated)
- Complement: 9 Officers; 96 Enlisted
- Armament: 1 × 3 in (76 mm)/50 caliber dual purpose gun (DP); 6 × 20 mm (0.8 in) Oerlikon anti-aircraft (AA) cannons

USS Nicollet (AK-199/AG-93/AVS-6) was originally an Alamosa-class cargo ship acquired by the U.S. Navy shortly before the end of World War II and converted into a "Gwinnett"-class aviation stores issue ship, to carry aviation parts and spares, and to issue them to the US Pacific Fleet and activities as needed. Nicollet was named for Nicollet County, Minnesota.

== Construction ==
Nicollet was laid down under a Maritime Commission (MARCOM) contract, MC hull 2153, on 9 February 1944, by the Globe Shipbuilding Company, in Superior, Wisconsin. She received her name on 25 February 1944. She was launched on 31 July 1944, as AK-199; sponsored by Mrs. F. C. Hanson. She was floated down the Mississippi River and converted for Navy use by Samuelson Shipyard, Beaumont, Texas, and Brown Shipyard, Houston, Texas; redesignated AG–93, on 12 March 1945; and commissioned 27 April.

== Service history ==
After shakedown in the Gulf of Mexico, Nicollet was reclassified AVS–6, effective 25 May 1945. Steaming to the Pacific Ocean, she arrived in the forward area and was assigned to Commander, Air Forces, Subordinate Command Forward, Pacific Fleet. She operated out of Apra Harbor, Guam.

Nicollet followed closely behind the invasion forces to supply newly acquired airstrips and aviation activities with spare parts and other needs. She salvaged goods, returned materials for repair and eventual re-use, and supplied aircraft carriers at sea.

At the end of hostilities, she continued to support naval and marine air groups, both carrier and land-based. In April 1946, she returned to the US West Coast, via Pearl Harbor. Following a cruise to the Gulf of Mexico, she sailed again to the western Pacific Ocean.

== Defense fleet ==
Returning to San Francisco, California, she decommissioned and was returned to the War Shipping Administration (WSA), 17 June 1946, and laid up in the Suisun Bay Reserve Fleet, in Suisun Bay, California. She was struck from the Navy Register on 3 July 1946.

== Merchant service ==
Nicollet was sold to the Republic of France, on 30 June 1947. She was reflagged and renamed Djerada. In 1959 she was transferred and reflagged in Morocco. She was eventually scrapped in 1970

== Bibliography ==
- "Nicollet". Dictionary of American Naval Fighting Ships. Naval History and Heritage Command. This article incorporates text from this source, which is in the public domain.
- Colton, Tim (28 August 2009). "C1 Cargo Ships". www.ShipbuildingHistory.com.
- Priolo, Gary P. (6 August 2021). "Nicollet (AG-93/AVS-6)". NavSource.
- "Nicollet (AK-199/AVS-6)". MARAD.
- "Nicollet".
