= Thailand in the Korean War =

The Royal Thai Expeditionary Forces to Korea 21st Combined Regiment
- Emblem of the Royal Thai Expeditionary Forces to Korea
- Active: August 1950 – March 1955
- Disbanded: 1955, after armistice
- Country: Thailand
- Allegiance: United Nations
- Branch: Army
- Type: Infantry Battalion
- Size: 11,786 over the course of the war
- Part of: US 1st Cavalry Division
- Nickname: "Little Tigers"
- Engagements: Korean War; Third Battle of Seoul; Battle of Pork Chop Hill; Battle of Chatkol; Battle of hill 351 (Near Kimhwa)
- Decorations: Republic of Korea Presidential Unit Citations (3); Presidential Unit Citation for the United States (Army)

Commanders
- Notable commanders: Major General Prince Pisit Dispongsa-Diskul; Lt. Colonel Kriengkrai Attanand; Major Kriangsak Chamanan

Thailand in the Korean War
- Part of the Korean Wars
- Type: War
- Location: South Korea
- Objective: To support South Korea against Communist attacks
- Date: 1950 – 1953
- Casualties: 129-137 killed 1,139 injured

The Kingdom of Thailand was one of the 21 countries who responded to the United Nations request to send troops to aid South Korea during the Korean War 1950–1953.

== Intervention ==
In July 1950, Thailand was the first Asian nation to respond to the US call for allies in Korea. Prime Minister Plaek Phibunsongkhram told parliament that, "by sending just a small number of troops as a token of our friendship, we will get various things in return." A month after agreeing to commit troops, Thailand received US$10 million in US economic aid and a US$25 million loan from the World Bank. Forty thousand tons of rice were sent to Korea immediately as food aid, followed by an infantry battalion from the 1st Infantry Battalion of the 21st Regimental Combat Team (later renamed the 21st Infantry Regiment, Queen's Guard), formed on 22 September, and several warships. Later in the conflict, several transport aircraft were sent by the Thai government.

== 21st Royal Thailand Regiment ==
=== Operations in Korea ===
- Battle of Pork Chop Hill
- Third Battle of Seoul

=== Battle of Pork Chop Hill ===
The Battle of Pork Chop Hill (31 October to 11 November 1952) involved numerous battles struggling for control of key territory along the front line while truce talks at Panmunjom proceeded. Pork Chop Hill was held by soldiers of the US 7th Infantry Division, the Thai 21st Infantry Battalion, and other units. They together repulsed attacks by the People's Volunteer Army (PVA). The Chinese made an all-out effort to capture the hill. Eventually, the UN forces withdrew from its heights, ceding it to the Chinese.

After the engagement, the United States military awarded Major Kriangsak Chamanan the Legion of Merit of which he was later invited and received scholarship to study at Fort Leavenworth, where he left his name in the school hall of fame. In 1977 he became the 25th Prime Minister of Thailand, serving until 1980. Another 12 received Silver Stars and 26 were awarded Bronze Star Medals. The Thai unit earned the nickname "Little Tigers" for their valour.

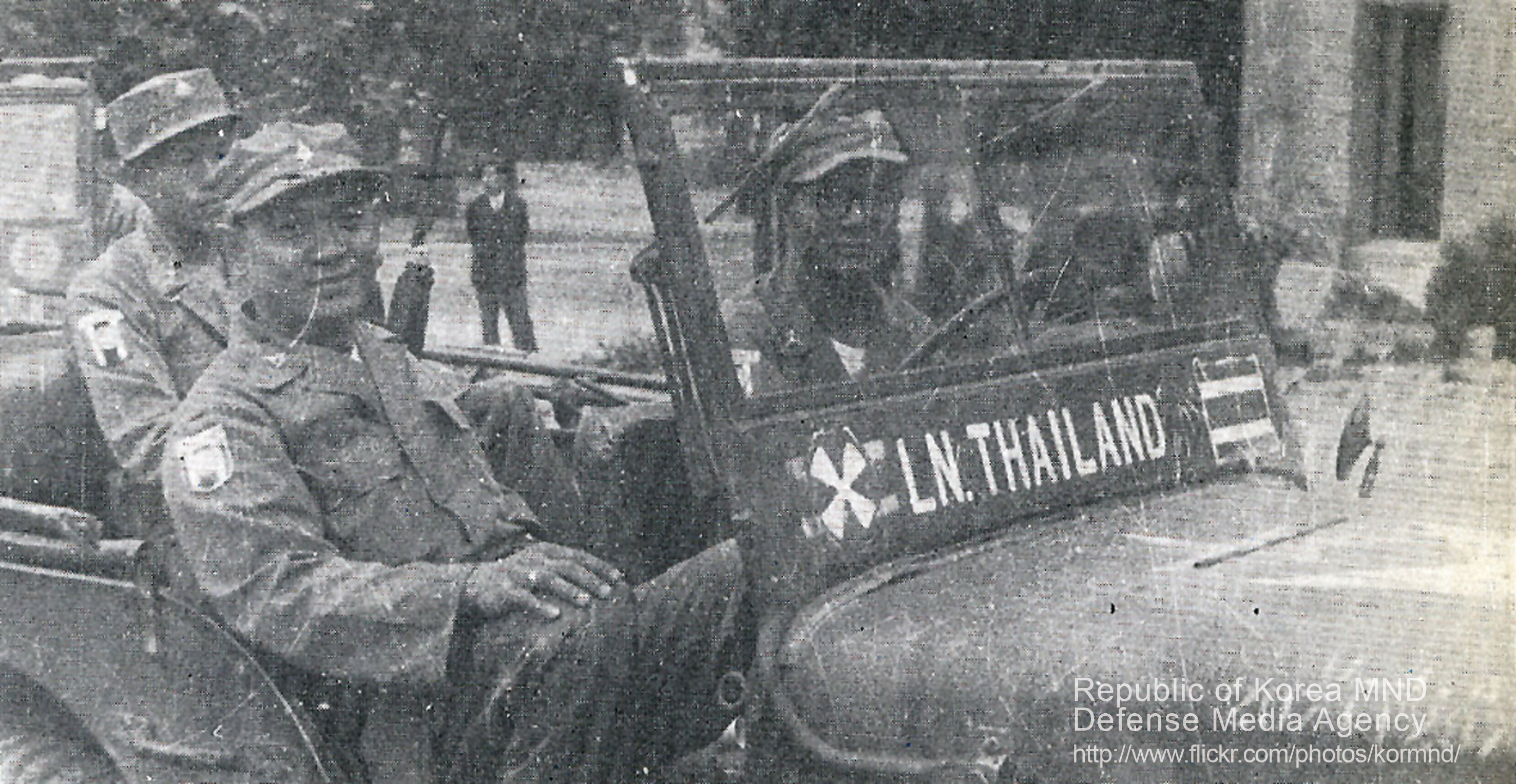
Thai Soldiers arriving at Pusan, 1950.

In last spring of the war (March to June 1953), the Thai infantry spent most of their time training and as 9th US Corps reserve. They then relocated to Kyo-dong on 4 May 1953. A battle followed in the vicinity of the "Boomerang" from 14 to 27 July 1953 northwest of Kimhwa, after a Belgian victory in the Battle of Chatkol.

=== Post-armistice ===
Small Thai contingents remained in Korea until June 1972 and a symbolic presence remains there in 2020.

== Navy ==
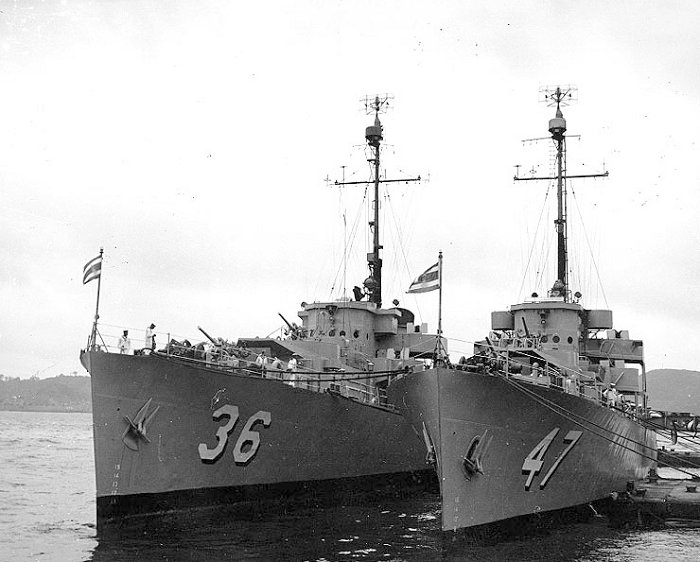
The USS Glendale and Gallup in Thailand, 1951 prior to being handed over to the Royal Thai Navy. The Gallup, which had already served in Korea with the US Navy, would also serve there with the Thai navy under the name HMTS Prasae II.

On 7 November 1950 two Thai warships, HTMS Prasae and HTMS Bangpakong, arrived in South Korea. They served under United Nations command, performing escort duty and shelling enemy targets on land. The Prasae ran aground on the coast near Yangyang during a snowstorm. Attempts to refloat her failed, and she was scuttled on 7 January 1951, her wreck being shelled to complete her destruction. The Bangpakong left Korea on 16 February 1952. On 29 December 1951 two more Thai warships, HTMS Prasae II and the HTMS Tachin, arrived in Korea. They sailed for home a year and a half after the armistice on 21 January 1955.

The transport ship HTMS Sichang arrived in Korea on 7 November 1950, remaining there until 15 July 1951.

== Air Force ==
Royal Thai Air Force (RTAF) Douglas C-47 Skytrain aircraft took part in the Korean War. Three task force contingents of the Royal Thai Air Force would serve in South Korea:

1. The first of a total of twenty-two Air Liaison Officers Teams was dispatched to the United Nations Command in 1951.
2. The first of twenty-nine Air Nursing Teams began its mission on 26 December 1950, remaining there until 1974.
3. A total of twenty-nine RTAF airlift mission teams served in South Korea from 1951 to 1971.

== Heritage ==
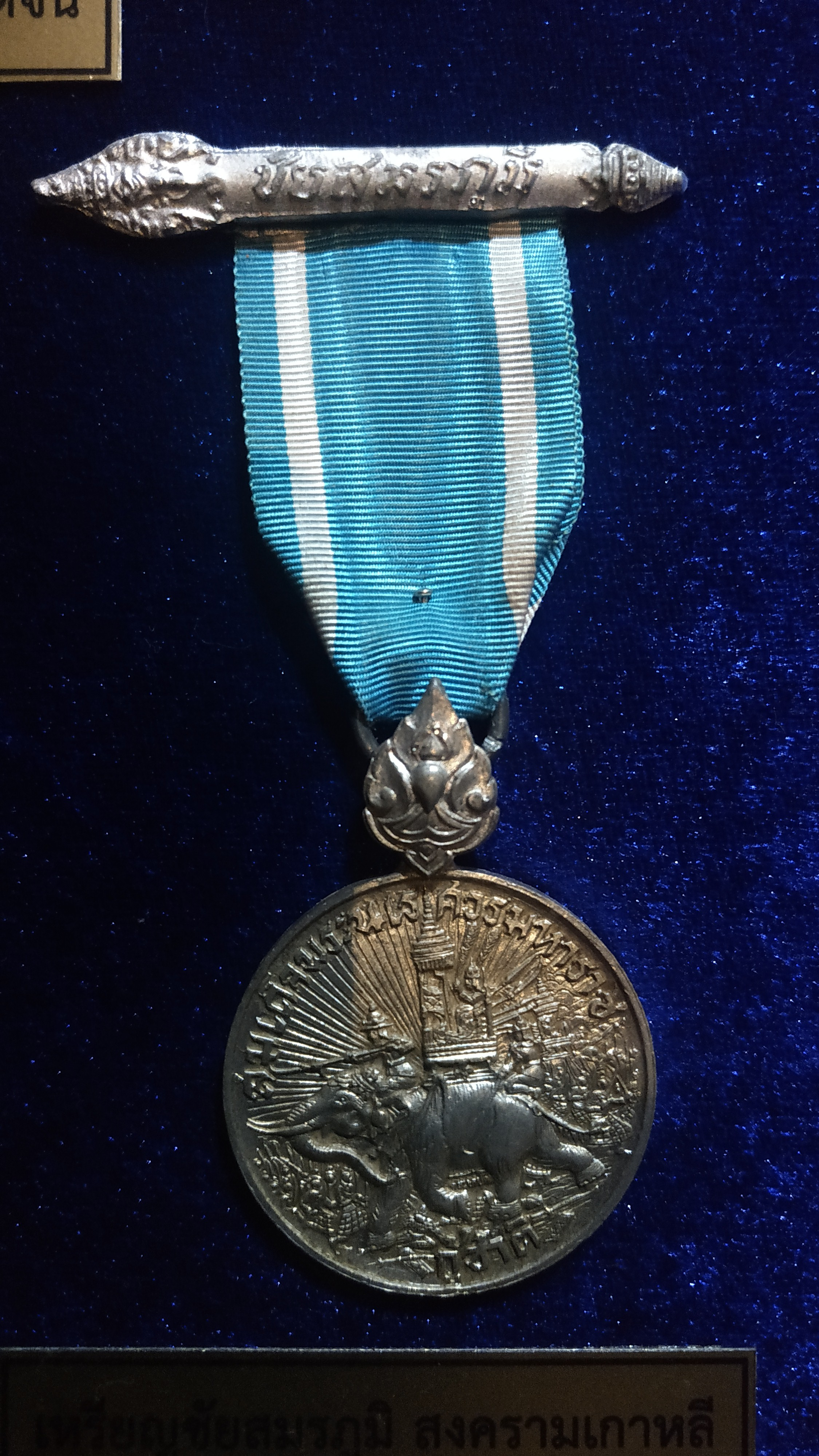
Thai Victory Medal for the Korean War.

Ribbon of the Thai Victory Medal for the Korean War.

During the course of the Korean War, Thailand dispatched a total of 11,786 soldiers to Korea. It is recorded that 129 Thai soldiers were killed in the war, 1,139 were wounded, and five were missing in action (MIA). In 1974, the Government of the Republic of Korea built a monument, and a Thai pavilion in Pocheon City, to honour the Thai soldiers who took part in the Korean War. On 4 November 2008, the Thai Embassy in Seoul, with the cooperation from the Office of Defense Attache, hosted the opening ceremony of the Thai memorial at the United Nations Memorial Cemetery in Korea (UNMCK) to commemorate the sacrifices made by Thai soldiers during the Korean War. Thailand still maintains, as of 2020, one liaison officer at the Armistice Committee site and six soldiers as members of the United Nations Command Honor Guard Company in Seoul.

HTMS Prasae II was decommissioned from the Royal Thai Navy in 2000, and was designated as a museum ship. She is visible at the mouth of the Prasae River, Rayong Province (Thailand) by the Prasae River Communities Committee where she serves as a memorial. There is also a monument to the 21st Infantry Regiment.

== See also ==
- Thailand in World War II
- Thailand in the Vietnam War
- United Nations Forces in the Korean War
- Medical support in the Korean War
