= K274 =

K274 or K-274 may refer to:

- K-274 (Kansas highway), a former state highway in Kansas
- HMIS Sind (K274), a former UK Royal Navy ship
