= USS Carson City (PF-50) =

Tacoma-class patrol frigate

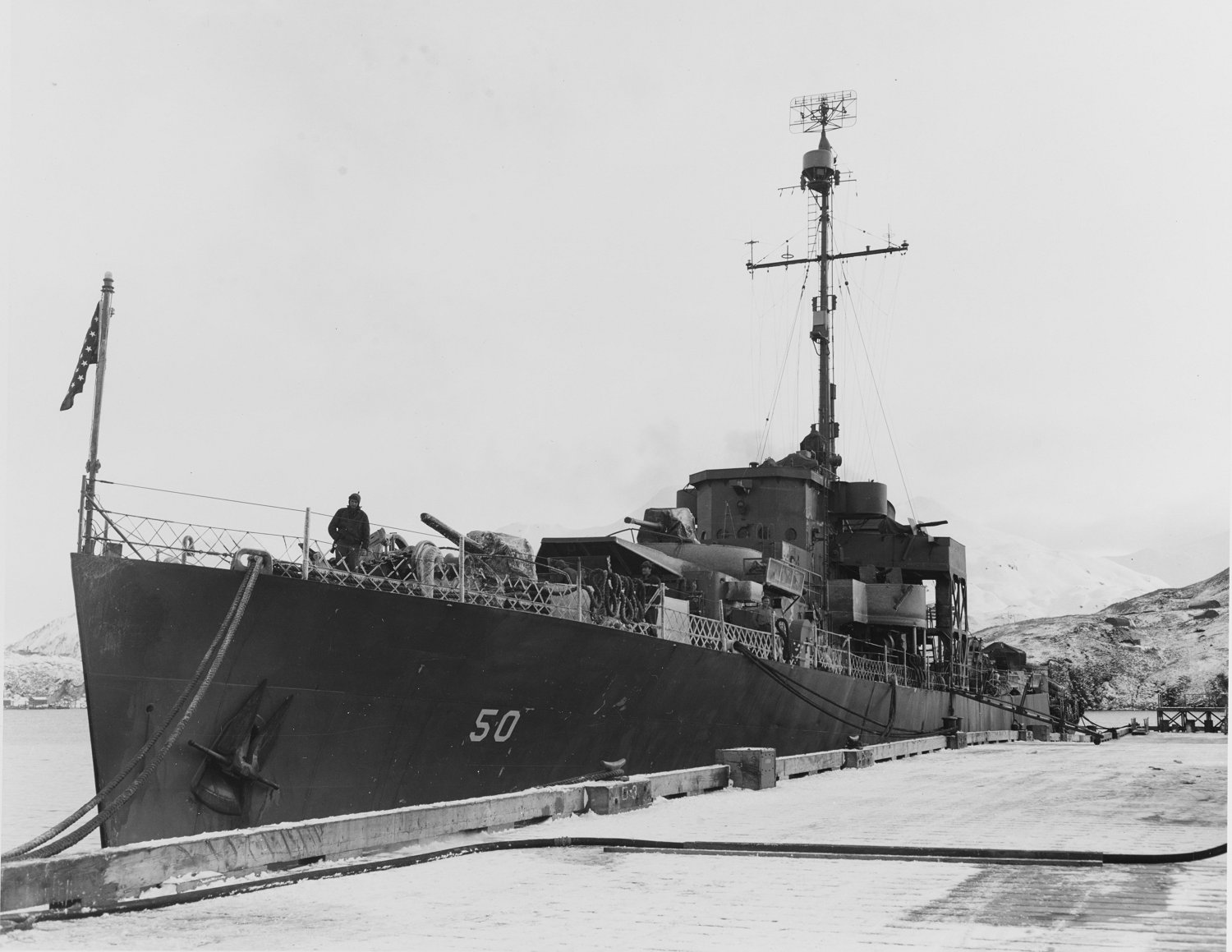
- Carson City in the Aleutians, circa 1944-1945

History

United States
- Name: Carson City
- Namesake: Cities of Carson City, Nevada, and; Carson City, Michigan
- Reclassified: PF-50, 15 April 1943
- Builder: Consolidated Steel Corporation, Wilmington, California
- Yard number: 535
- Laid down: 28 September 1943
- Launched: 13 November 1943
- Sponsored by: Mrs. C. B. Austin
- Commissioned: 24 March 1944
- Decommissioned: 26 August 1945
- Honors and awards: 2 battle stars, World War II
- Fate: Transferred to Soviet Navy, 26 August 1945
- Acquired: Returned by Soviet Navy, 31 October 1949
- Fate: Transferred to Japan Maritime Self-Defense Force, 30 April 1953
- Acquired: Returned by Japan Maritime Self-Defense Force, 6 August 1971
- Fate: Unknown

Soviet Union
- Name: EK-20
- Acquired: 26 August 1945
- Commissioned: 26 August 1945
- Decommissioned: 31 October 1949
- Fate: Returned to United States, 31 October 1949

Japan
- Name: Sakura
- Acquired: 30 April 1953
- Renamed: YAC-16, 31 March 1966
- Reclassified: Auxiliary stock craft, 31 March 1966
- Decommissioned: 31 March 1971
- Fate: Returned to United States, 6 August 1971

General characteristics
- Class & type: Tacoma-class frigate
- Displacement: 1,264 long tons (1,284 t); 1,430 long tons (1,453 t) light; 2,415 long tons (2,454 t) full
- Length: 303 ft 11 in (92.63 m)
- Beam: 37 ft 6 in (11.43 m)
- Draft: 13 ft 8 in (4.17 m)
- Propulsion: 2 × 5,500 shp (4,101 kW) turbines; 3 boilers; 2 shafts
- Speed: 20 knots (37 km/h; 23 mph)
- Complement: 190
- Armament: 3 × 3"/50 dual purpose guns (3x1); 4 x 40 mm guns (2×2); 9 × 20 mm guns (9×1); 1 × Hedgehog anti-submarine mortar; 8 × Y-gun depth charge projectors; 2 × Depth charge tracks

USS Carson City (PF-50), a Tacoma-class frigate in commission from 1944 to 1945, thus far has been the only ship of the United States Navy to be named for Carson City, Nevada. She later served in the Soviet Navy as EK-20 and in the Japan Maritime Self-Defense Force as JDS Sakura (PF-10), JDS Sakura (PF-290) and as YAC-16.

== Construction and commissioning ==
Originally classified as a patrol gunboat, PG-158, Carson City was reclassified as a patrol frigate, PF-50, on 15 April 1943. Constructed under a Maritime Commission contract, she was launched on 13 November 1943, by Consolidated Steel Corporation at Wilmington, California, sponsored by Mrs. C. B. Austin, and commissioned on 24 March 1944.

== Service history ==
=== US Navy, World War II, 1944-1945 ===
Crewed by the United States Coast Guard, Carson City departed Los Angeles, California, on 19 July 1944, for Espiritu Santo and Milne Bay, New Guinea, where on 13 August 1944, she reported for patrol and escort duty in the New Guinea area with the United States Seventh Fleet. She took part in the unopposed landings on Morotai on 16 September 1944, then took part in guarding ships, men, and supplies being assembled for the landings on Leyte in the Philippine Islands. She herself sailed for Leyte Gulf from Humboldt Bay, New Guinea, on 16 October 1944, supporting the first wave of reinforcements for the Northern Attack Force at Leyte. On 22 October 1944, she accompanied her charges into the landing area, and next day began a voyage escorting the empty ships back to Humboldt Bay.

After reaching Humboldt Bay, Carson City resumed convoy escort duty in the New Guinea area, shuttling to Wakde, Biak, Noemfoor, Sansapor, Morotai, and Mios Woendi until 26 November 1944, when she departed New Guinea for Pearl Harbor, Territory of Hawaii, where she underwent an overhaul. Upon its completion, she steamed north for duty with the Alaskan Sea Frontier at Dutch Harbor, Territory of Alaska, where she reported on 12 January 1945 and began patrol and escort duties in Alaskan waters. Selected for transfer to the Soviet Navy in Project Hula – a secret program for the transfer of US Navy ships to the Soviet Navy at Cold Bay, Alaska, in anticipation of the Soviet Union joining the war against Japan – Carson City proceeded to Cold Bay in August 1945 and began training her new Soviet crew.

=== Soviet Navy, 1945–1949 ===
Following the completion of training for her Soviet crew, Carson City was decommissioned on 26 August 1945, at Cold Bay and transferred to the Soviet Union under Lend-Lease immediately along with her sister ships USS Bisbee (PF-46), USS Gallup (PF-47), USS Rockford (PF-48), USS Muskogee (PF-49), and USS Burlington (PF-51). Commissioned into the Soviet Navy immediately, Carson City was designated as a storozhevoi korabl ("escort ship") and renamed EK-20 in Soviet service. She soon departed Cold Bay bound for Petropavlovsk-Kamchatsky in the Soviet Union, where she served as a patrol vessel in the Soviet Far East.

In February 1946, the United States began negotiations for the return of ships loaned to the Soviet Union for use during World War II. On 8 May 1947, United States Secretary of the Navy James V. Forrestal informed the United States Department of State that the United States Department of the Navy wanted 480 of the 585 combatant ships it had transferred to the Soviet Union for World War II use returned, EK-20 among them. Negotiations for the return of the ships were protracted, but on 1 November 1949, the Soviet Union finally returned EK-20 to the U.S. Navy at Yokosuka, Japan.

=== Japan Maritime Self-Defense Force, 1953–1971 ===
Reverting to her original name, Carson City lay idle in the Pacific Reserve Fleet until the United States transferred her to the Japan Maritime Self-Defense Force on 30 April 1953 as JDS Sakura (PF-10) (さくら (PF-10); "cherry blossom"). Sakura was redesignated PF-290 on 1 September 1957. She was reclassified as an "auxiliary stock craft" (YAC) and renamed YAC-16 on 31 March 1966. She was decommissioned on 31 March 1971 and returned to U.S. custody for disposal on 6 August 1971. Her final disposition is unknown.

According to some reports, ex-USS Carson City was sold for scrap following her return from Japanese control, and was scrapped by a breaker in Taiwan. The ships bell is currently displayed inside the City Hall of Carson City, Nevada, along with the ship's commissioning pennant.

== Awards ==
The US Navy awarded Carson City two battle stars for her World War II service.
