= USS Muskogee =

Tacoma-class patrol frigate

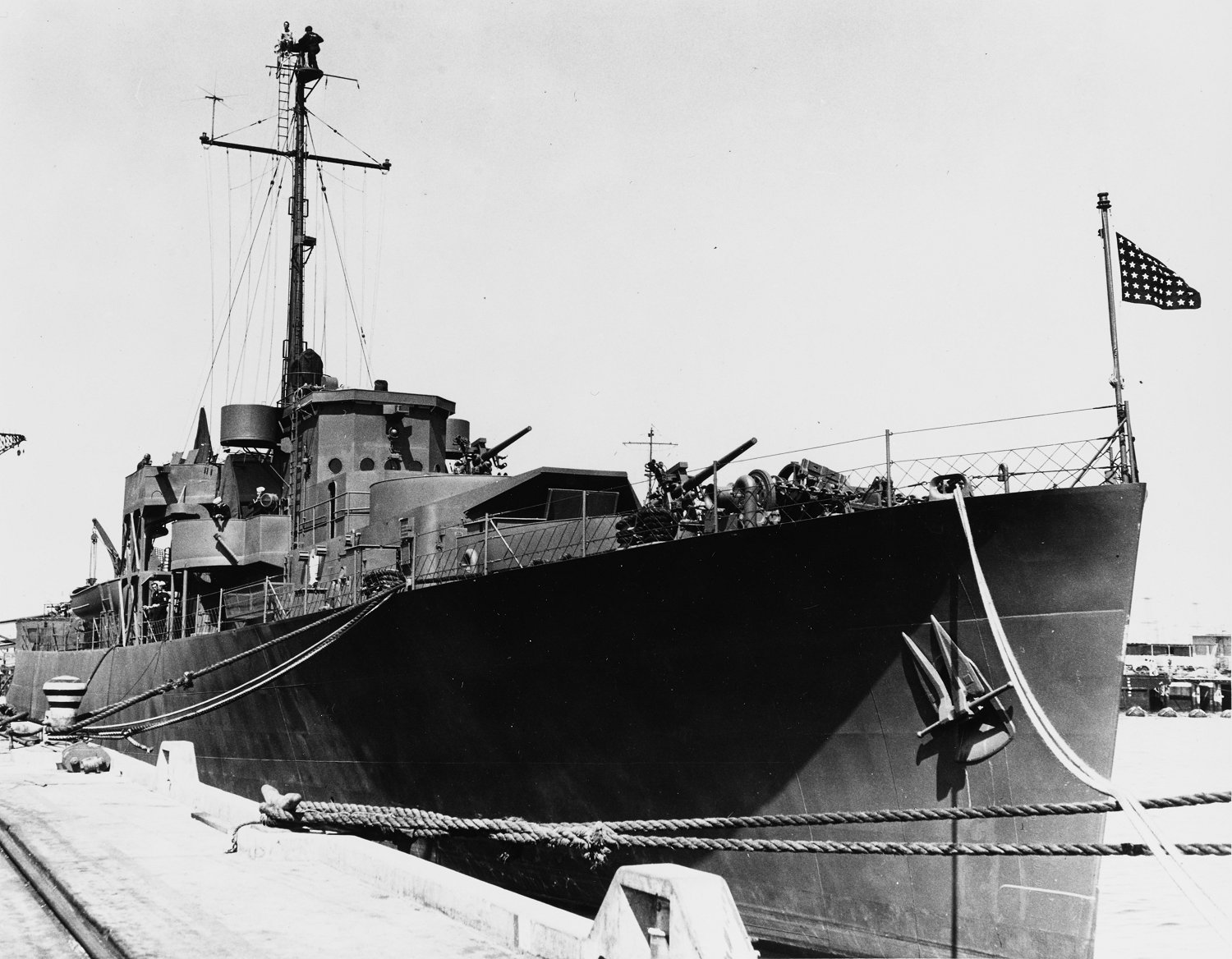
- Muskogee seen in 1944

History

United States
- Name: Muskogee
- Namesake: City of Muskogee, Oklahoma
- Reclassified: PF-49, 15 April 1943
- Builder: Consolidated Steel Corporation, Wilmington, California
- Yard number: 534
- Laid down: 18 September 1943
- Launched: 18 October 1943
- Sponsored by: Mrs. S. B. Hudson
- Commissioned: 16 March 1944
- Decommissioned: 26 August 1945
- Honors and awards: 1 battle star, World War II
- Fate: Transferred to Soviet Navy, 26 August 1945
- Acquired: Returned by Soviet Navy, 1 November 1949
- Fate: Transferred to Republic of Korea Navy, 23 October 1950
- Stricken: 15 September 1972

Soviet Union
- Name: EK-19
- Acquired: 26 August 1945
- Commissioned: 26 August 1945
- Fate: Returned to United States, 1 November 1949

South Korea
- Name: Duman
- Acquired: 23 October 1950
- Fate: unknown

General characteristics
- Class & type: Tacoma-class frigate
- Displacement: 1,430 long tons (1,453 t) light; 2,415 long tons (2,454 t) full
- Length: 303 ft 11 in (92.63 m)
- Beam: 37 ft 6 in (11.43 m)
- Draft: 13 ft 8 in (4.17 m)
- Propulsion: 2 × 5,500 shp (4,101 kW) turbines; 3 boilers; 2 shafts
- Speed: 20 knots (37 km/h; 23 mph)
- Complement: 190
- Armament: 3 × 3"/50 dual purpose guns (3x1); 4 x 40 mm guns (2×2); 9 × 20 mm guns (9×1); 1 × Hedgehog anti-submarine mortar; 8 × Y-gun depth charge projectors; 2 × Depth charge tracks

USS Muskogee (PF-49), a Tacoma-class frigate in commission from 1944 to 1945, thus far has been the only ship of the United States Navy to be named for Muskogee, Oklahoma. She later served in the Soviet Navy as EK-19 and in the Republic of Korea Navy as ROKS Dumon (PF-61).

== Construction and commissioning ==
Originally classified as a patrol gunboat, PG-157, Muskogee was reclassified as a patrol frigate, PF-49, on 15 April 1943. She was laid down on 18 September 1943, by Consolidated Steel Corporation at Wilmington, California, launched on 18 October 1943, sponsored by Mrs. S. B. Hudson, wife of the mayor of Muskogee, and commissioned on 16 March 1944.

== Service history ==
=== US Navy, World War II, 1944-1945 ===
After training and exercises off the California coast, Muskogee, crewed by the United States Coast Guard, departed San Pedro, California, on 18 June 1944, for Nouméa, New Caledonia, where she arrived on 18 July 1944, for patrol and escort duty from Nouméa and, after its capture, Humboldt Bay, New Guinea. Anti-submarine patrol and screening for ships operating around New Guinea were her primary duties into October 1944.

On 18 October 1944 she got underway screening the second reinforcement group bound for newly invaded Leyte in the Philippine Islands, arriving in San Pedro Bay on 24 October to screen transports and supply ships under numerous Japanese air attacks while waiting for a group of empty tank landing ships to form up for the return passage. As her convoy retired on 26 October 1944, Japanese aircraft again attacked it, and Muskogee joined in downing several enemy aircraft. A second escort voyage to Leyte in early November 1944 was less eventful.

Concluding her New Guinea patrols, Muskogee arrived in Pearl Harbor, Territory of Hawaii, on 15 December 1944, then reported at Dutch Harbor, Territory of Alaska, on 12 January 1945 for similar duty in the Aleutian Islands. Selected for transfer to the Soviet Navy in Project Hula – a secret program for the transfer of U.S. Navy ships to the Soviet Navy at Cold Bay, Alaska, in anticipation of the Soviet Union joining the war against Japan – Muskogee departed Adak on 6 July 1945 bound for Seattle, Washington. After undergoing repairs and conversion at Seattle in preparation for her transfer, Muskogee steamed to Cold Bay, where she soon began training her new Soviet crew.

=== Soviet Navy, 1945–1949 ===
Following the completion of training for her Soviet crew, Muskogee was decommissioned on 26 August 1945 at Cold Bay and transferred to the Soviet Union under Lend-Lease immediately along with her sister ships USS Bisbee (PF-46), USS Gallup (PF-47), USS Rockford (PF-48), USS Carson City (PF-50), and USS Burlington (PF-51). Commissioned into the Soviet Navy immediately, Muskogee was designated as a storozhevoi korabl ("escort ship") and renamed EK-19 in Soviet service. She soon departed Cold Bay bound for Petropavlovsk-Kamchatsky in the Soviet Union, where she served as a patrol vessel in the Soviet Far East.

In February 1946, the United States began negotiations for the return of ships loaned to the Soviet Union for use during World War II. On 8 May 1947, United States Secretary of the Navy James V. Forrestal informed the United States Department of State that the United States Department of the Navy wanted 480 of the 585 combatant ships it had transferred to the Soviet Union for World War II use returned, EK-19 among them. Negotiations for the return of the ships were protracted, but on 1 November 1949 the Soviet Union finally returned EK-19 to the U.S. Navy at Yokosuka, Japan.

=== Republic of Korea Navy, 1950- ? ===
Reverting to her original name, Muskogee lay idle in the Pacific Reserve Fleet at Yokosuka until the United States loaned her to the Republic of Korea on 23 October 1950. Commissioned into the Republic of Korea Navy as ROKS Dumon (PF-61), she saw service in the Korean War. The U.S. Navy struck the ship from the Naval Vessel Register on 15 September 1972 and the United States transferred her outright to South Korea under the Security Assistance Program on 1 October 1973. Her final disposition is unknown.

== Awards ==
The US Navy awarded Muskogee one battle star for her World War II service.
