= USS Rockford =

Tacoma-class patrol frigate

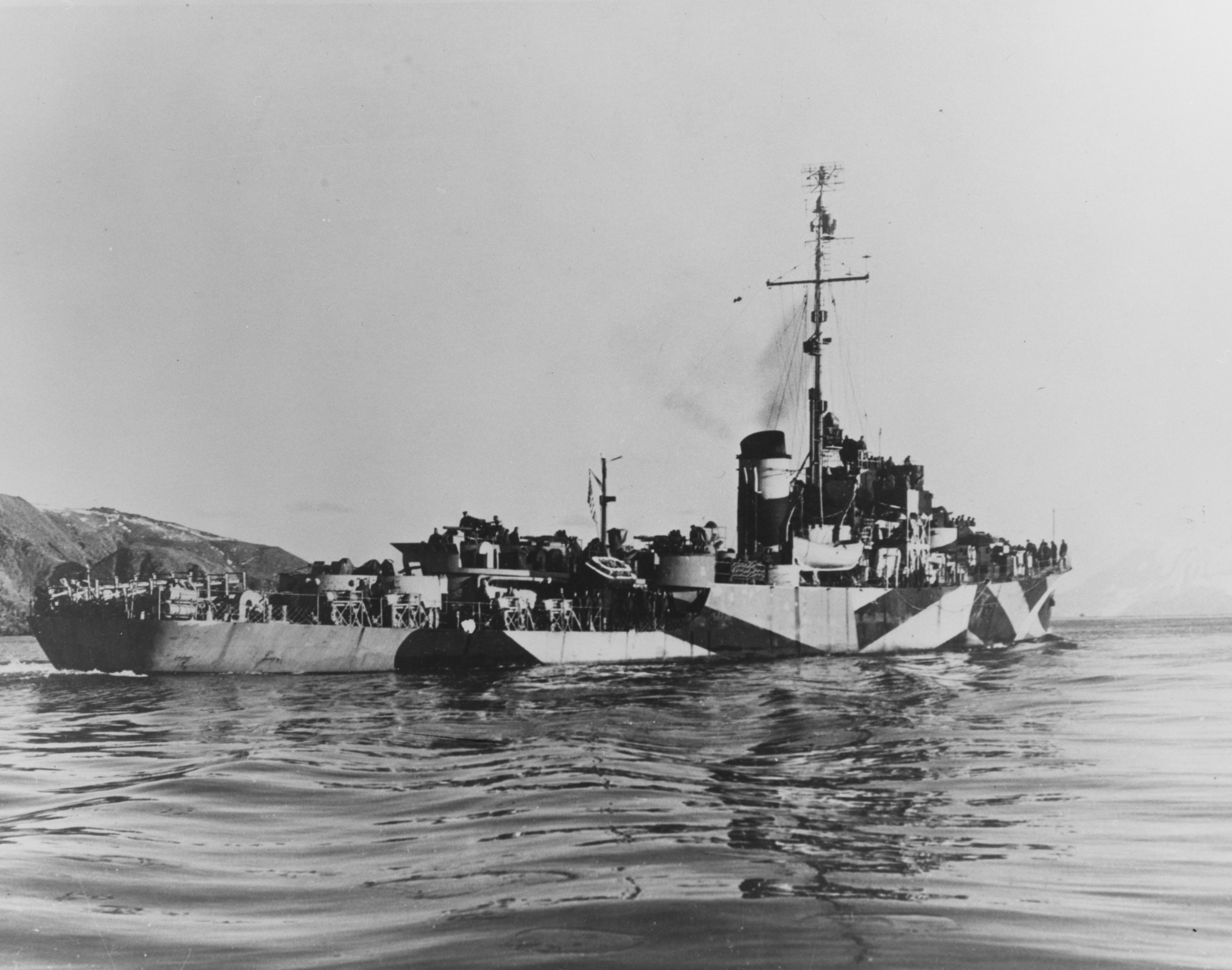
- USS Rockford (PF-48) painted in dazzle camouflage Measure 32, Design 16d, at Adak, Territory of Alaska, on 30 January 1945.

History

United States
- Name: Rockford
- Namesake: City of Rockford, Illinois
- Reclassified: PF-48, 15 April 1943
- Builder: Consolidated Steel Corporation, Wilmington, California
- Yard number: 533
- Laid down: 28 August 1943
- Launched: 27 September 1943
- Sponsored by: Mrs. Harry L. Crotzer
- Commissioned: 6 March 1944
- Decommissioned: 26 August 1945
- Honors and awards: 2 battle stars, World War II
- Fate: Transferred to the Soviet Navy, 26 August 1945
- Acquired: Returned by Soviet Navy, 1 November 1949
- Fate: Transferred to Republic of Korea Navy, 23 October 1950
- Acquired: Returned by Republic of Korea Navy, 3 September 1952
- Stricken: 26 May 1953
- Fate: Sunk as target, 30 September 1953

Soviet Union
- Name: EK-18
- Acquired: 26 August 1945
- Commissioned: 26 August 1945
- Fate: Returned to United States, 1 November 1949

South Korea
- Name: ROKS Apnok (62)
- Acquired: 23 October 1950
- Fate: Irreparable damage in collision, 21 May 1952; Returned to United States, 3 September 1952

General characteristics
- Class & type: Tacoma-class frigate
- Displacement: 1,430 long tons (1,453 t) light; 2,415 long tons (2,454 t) full
- Length: 303 ft 11 in (92.63 m)
- Beam: 37 ft 6 in (11.43 m)
- Draft: 13 ft 8 in (4.17 m)
- Propulsion: 2 × 5,500 shp (4,101 kW) turbines; 3 boilers; 2 shafts
- Speed: 20 knots (37 km/h; 23 mph)
- Complement: 190
- Armament: 3 × 3"/50 dual purpose guns (3x1); 4 x 40 mm guns (2×2); 9 × 20 mm guns (9×1); 1 × Hedgehog anti-submarine mortar; 8 × Y-gun depth charge projectors; 2 × Depth charge tracks

USS Rockford (PF-48), a Tacoma-class frigate in commission from 1944 to 1945, thus far has been the only ship of the United States Navy to be named for Rockford, Illinois. She later served in the Soviet Navy as EK-18 and in the Republic of Korea Navy as ROKS Apnokkang (62).

== Construction and commissioning ==
Originally classified as a patrol gunboat, PG-156, Rockford was reclassified as a patrol frigate, PF-48, on 15 April 1943. She was laid down on 28 August 1943, by Consolidated Steel Corporation in Los Angeles, California, launched on 27 September 1943, sponsored by Mrs. Harry L. Crotzer, and commissioned on 6 March 1944.

== Service history ==
=== U.S. Navy, World War II, 1944–1945 ===
Following shakedown off Los Angeles, Rockford, crewed by the United States Coast Guard, reported to the United States Pacific Fleet and got underway on 25 June 1944 for the Southwest Pacific. On 2 July 1944 she attacked a Japanese submarine with depth charges, doing some damage. She made a second antisubmarine attack with Hedgehogs antisubmarine mortars on 7 July 1944. Continuing her voyage, she proceeded via Espiritu Santo to Australia, arriving at Cairns, Queensland, on 23 July 1944.

On 2 August 1944, Rockford moored in Milne Bay, New Guinea, and then operated on convoy escort duty and antisubmarine patrol off the New Guinea coast until 23 September 1944, when she made a brief run to Manus Island in the Admiralty Islands.

Rockford then returned to New Guinea, remaining there until 15 October 1944, when she began a voyage to the United States West Coast via Manus Island and Pearl Harbor, Territory of Hawaii. On 13 November 1944, during the final leg of the voyage, Rockford and the minesweeper USS Ardent (AM-340) attacked and sank the Japanese submarine I-12 midway between Hawaii and California; there were no survivors from I-12. In sinking I-12, Rockford and Ardent unwittingly had avenged the crew of the Liberty Ship SS John A. Johnson; on 30 October 1944, after sinking John A. Johnson, I-12 had rammed and sunk her lifeboats and rafts and then machine-gunned her 70 survivors, killing 10.

On 17 November 1944, Rockford arrived on the U.S. West Coast for scheduled repairs. After their completion, she reported for duty on 4 January 1945 to Commander, Alaskan Sea Frontier, for duty in the waters of the Territory of Alaska and the North Pacific, operating until August 1945 from Dutch Harbor, Cold Bay, and Adak as pilot vessel for the USS Disdain (AM-222) group.

Selected for transfer to the Soviet Navy in Project Hula – a secret program for the transfer of U.S. Navy ships to the Soviet Navy at Cold Bay in anticipation of the Soviet Union joining the war against Japan – Rockford began training her new Soviet crew at Cold Bay in August 1945.

=== Soviet Navy, 1945–1949 ===
Following the completion of training for her Soviet crew, Rockford was decommissioned on 26 August 1945 at Cold Bay and transferred to the Soviet Union under Lend-Lease immediately along with her sister ships USS Bisbee (PF-46), USS Gallup (PF-47), USS Muskogee (PF-49), USS Carson City (PF-50), and USS Burlington (PF-51). Commissioned into the Soviet Navy immediately, Rockford was designated as a storozhevoi korabl ("escort ship") and renamed EK-18 in Soviet service. She soon departed Cold Bay bound for Petropavlovsk-Kamchatsky in the Soviet Union, where she served as a patrol vessel in the Soviet Far East.

In February 1946, the United States began negotiations for the return of ships loaned to the Soviet Union for use during World War II. On 8 May 1947, United States Secretary of the Navy James V. Forrestal informed the United States Department of State that the United States Department of the Navy wanted 480 of the 585 combatant ships it had transferred to the Soviet Union for World War II use returned, EK-18 among them. Negotiations for the return of the ships were protracted, but on 1 November 1949 the Soviet Union finally returned EK-18 to the U.S. Navy at Yokosuka, Japan.

=== Republic of Korea Navy, 1950–1952 ===
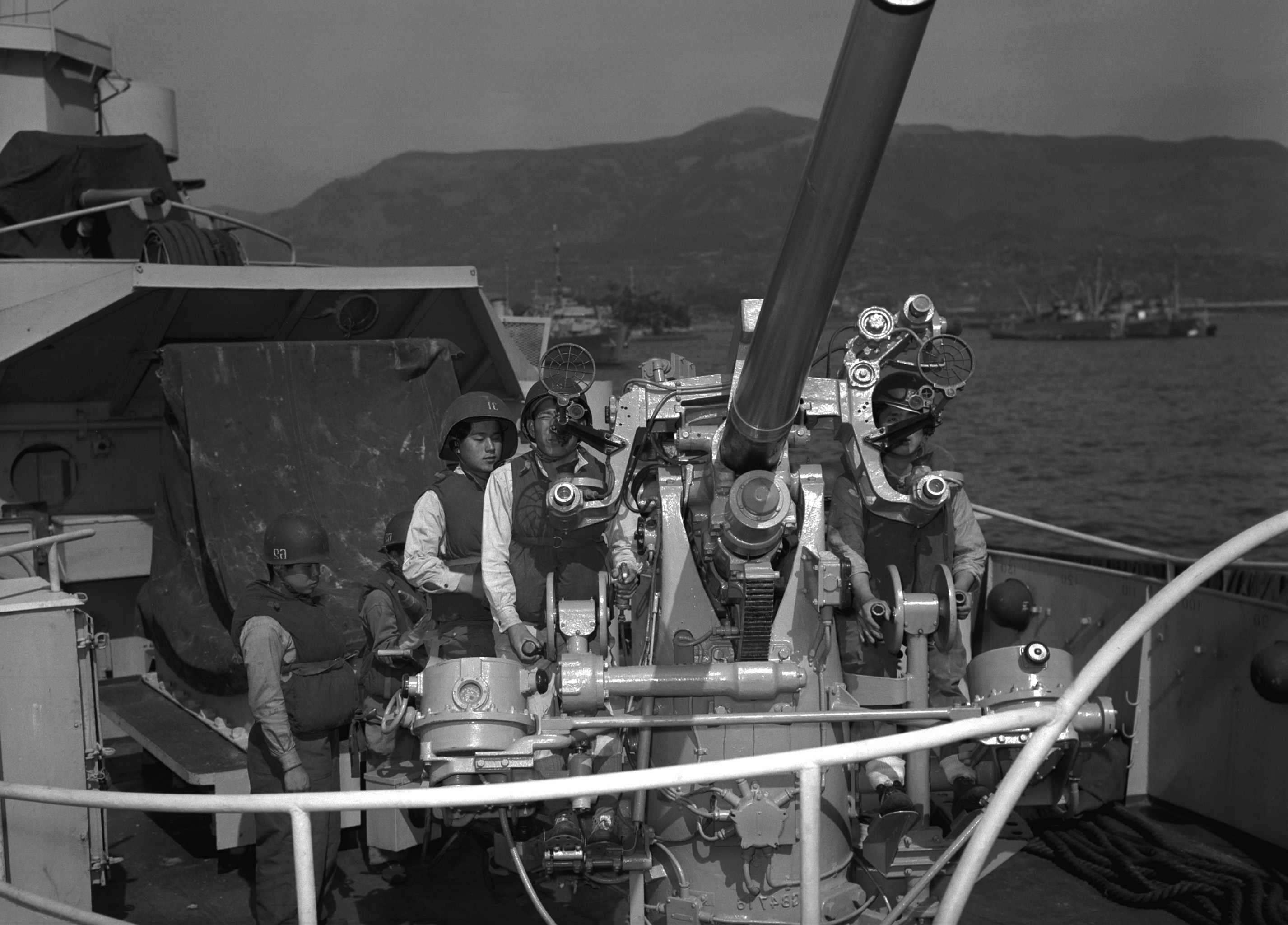
South Korean sailors aboard Amnokgang (PF 62) at their battle stations on a 3-inch (76.2 mm) gun mounted on the forecastle of the ship.

Reverting to her original name, Rockford lay idle in the Pacific Reserve Fleet at Yokosuka until the United States loaned her to the Republic of Korea on 23 October 1950 for Korean War service in enforcing the United Nations blockade against North Korea and harassing enemy forces. She served the Republic of Korea Navy as ROKS Apnok (62). On 21 May 1952, she was escorting the U.S. Navy ammunition ship USS Mount Baker (AE-4) when Mount Baker struck her amidships, killing 25 and injuring 21 of Apnok's crew. The collision damaged Apnok beyond economical repair. South Korea returned her to the U.S. Navy on 3 September 1952 for disposal.

=== Disposal ===
Reverting to her original name and assigned a status of "inactive out of commission in reserve" by the U.S. Navy, Rockford was struck from the Navy list on 26 May 1953 and sunk as a torpedo target on 30 September 1953.

== Awards ==
The U.S. Navy awarded Rockford two battle stars for her World War II service.
