= USS Bisbee =

Tacoma-class patrol frigate

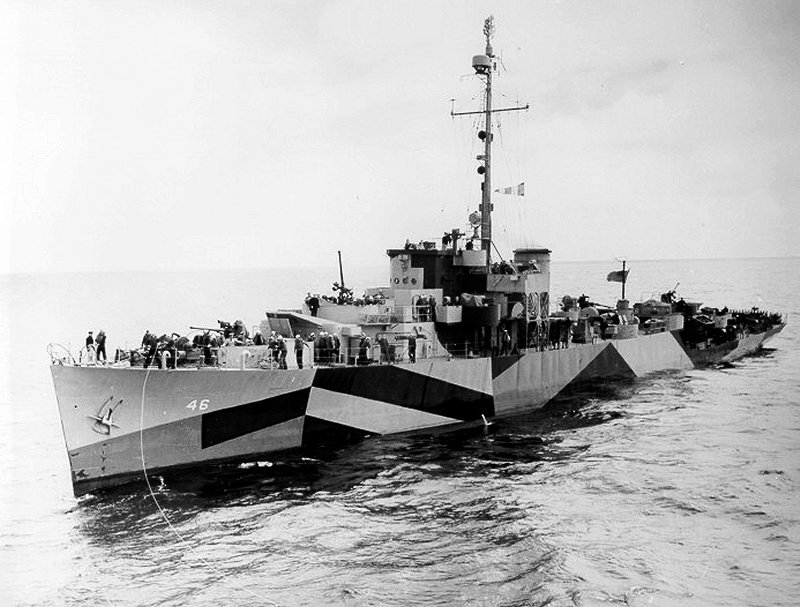
- USS Bisbee (PF-46) off Coco Solo, Panama Canal Zone, on 24 April 1944

History

United States
- Name: Bisbee
- Namesake: City of Bisbee, Arizona
- Reclassified: PF-46, 15 April 1943
- Builder: Consolidated Steel Corporation, Wilmington, California
- Yard number: 531
- Laid down: 7 August 1943
- Launched: 7 September 1943
- Sponsored by: Mrs. Richard Murphy
- Commissioned: 15 February 1944
- Decommissioned: 26 August 1945
- Honors and awards: 2 battle stars, World War II
- Fate: Transferred to the Soviet Navy 26 August 1945
- Acquired: Returned by Soviet Navy, 1 November 1949
- Recommissioned: 18 October 1950
- Decommissioned: 20 October 1951
- Honors and awards: 3 battle stars, Korean War
- Fate: Transferred to Colombian National Armada, 13 February 1952

Soviet Union
- Name: EK-17
- Acquired: 26 August 1945
- Commissioned: 26 August 1945
- Fate: Returned to United States, 1 November 1949

Colombia
- Name: Capitán Tono
- Acquired: 13 February 1952
- Fate: Scrapped, 1963

General characteristics
- Class & type: Tacoma-class frigate
- Displacement: 1,430 long tons (1,453 t) light; 2,415 long tons (2,454 t) full
- Length: 303 ft 11 in (92.63 m)
- Beam: 37 ft 6 in (11.43 m)
- Draft: 13 ft 8 in (4.17 m)
- Propulsion: 2 × 5,500 shp (4,101 kW) turbines; 3 boilers; 2 shafts
- Speed: 20 knots (37 km/h; 23 mph)
- Complement: 190
- Armament: 3 × 3"/50 dual purpose guns (3x1); 4 x 40 mm guns (2×2); 9 × 20 mm guns (9×1); 1 × Hedgehog anti-submarine mortar; 8 × Y-gun depth charge projectors; 2 × Depth charge tracks

USS Bisbee (PF-46) was a United States Navy Tacoma-class frigate in commission from 1944 to 1945 and from 1950 to 1951. She also served in the Soviet Navy as EK-17 and in the Colombian National Armada as ARC Capitán Tono.

== Construction and commissioning ==
Originally classified as a patrol gunboat, PG-154, Bisbee was reclassified as a patrol frigate, PF-46, on 15 April 1943. She was launched on 7 September 1943, at the Consolidated Steel Corporation shipyard in Los Angeles, California, sponsored by Mrs. Richard Murphy, and commissioned on 15 February 1944.

== Service history ==
=== U.S. Navy, World War II, 1944–1945 ===
Assigned to the United States Pacific Fleet and crewed by the United States Coast Guard, Bisbee joined the United States Seventh Fleet at Nouméa, New Caledonia, on 27 June 1944. She took part in the landings on Biak Island of 12–31 August 1944, and then patrolled off the New Guinea coast until October 1944. During the invasion of Leyte in the Philippine Islands, she served as a patrol and harbor control vessel until detached for escort duty on 22 November 1944. Bisbee arrived at Pearl Harbor, Territory of Hawaii, on 15 December 1944.

After undergoing repairs, Bisbee departed Pearl Harbor on 6 January 1945 for Dutch Harbor, Territory of Alaska, arriving there on 13 January 1945. From then until July 1945, she escorted merchant ships and United States Army transports between Dutch Harbor, Adak, Amchitka, and Attu, and acted as guard ship for Fleet Air Wing 4 in the North Pacific Ocean.

Stage and film actor Buddy Ebsen served as the Executive Officer aboard Bisbee during this deployment to the Pacific War Zone.

Selected for transfer to the Soviet Navy in Project Hula – a secret program for the transfer of U.S. Navy ships to the Soviet Navy at Cold Bay, Alaska, in anticipation of the Soviet Union joining the war against Japan – Bisbee, with Escort Division 43, departed Adak on 6 July 1945 bound for Seattle, Washington, arriving there on 12 July 1945. After undergoing repairs and conversion in preparation for her transfer, Bisbee steamed to Cold Bay, where she arrived on 13 August 1945. She soon began training her new Soviet crew.

=== Soviet Navy, 1945–1949 ===
Following the completion of training for her Soviet crew, Bisbee was decommissioned on 26 August 1945 at Cold Bay and transferred to the Soviet Union under Lend-Lease immediately along with her sister ships USS Gallup (PF-47), USS Rockford (PF-48), USS Muskogee (PF-49), USS Carson City (PF-50), and USS Burlington (PF-51). Commissioned into the Soviet Navy immediately, Bisbee was designated as a storozhevoi korabl ("escort ship") and renamed EK-17 in Soviet service. She soon departed Cold Bay bound for Petropavlovsk-Kamchatsky in the Soviet Union, where she served as a patrol vessel in the Soviet Far East.

In February 1946, the United States began negotiations for the return of ships loaned to the Soviet Union for use during World War II. On 8 May 1947, United States Secretary of the Navy James V. Forrestal informed the United States Department of State that the United States Department of the Navy wanted 480 of the 585 combatant ships it had transferred to the Soviet Union for World War II use returned, EK-17 among them. Negotiations for the return of the ships were protracted, but on 1 November 1949 the Soviet Union finally returned EK-17 to the U.S. Navy at Yokosuka, Japan.

=== U.S. Navy, Korean War, 1950–1951 ===
Reverting to her original name, Bisbee lay idle in the Pacific Reserve Fleet at Yokosuka until being recommissioned on 18 October 1950 for service in the Korean War. She got underway for Korea on 23 November 1950, and served on patrol, escort, and bombardment duty off Korea – also making occasional voyages to the Philippine Islands, Hong Kong, and the Pescadores – until decommissioned on 20 October 1951.

=== Colombian Navy, 1952–1963 ===
After repairs at Yokosuka, the ship was transferred to Colombia on 13 February 1952 under the Mutual Defense Assistance Program, serving in the Colombian Navy as ARC Capitán Tono. She relieved her sister ship ARC Almirante Padilla, ex-USS Groton (PF-29), and served on patrol off the east coast of Korea. Exchanges of fire with shore batteries were a frequent occurrence, and her crew suffered some casualties. On 13 January 1953, Capitán Tono ended her tour of duty and was replaced by another of her sister ships, ARC Almirante Brión, ex-USS Burlington (PF-51).

The ship remained in Colombian service after the Korean War and was scrapped in 1963.

== Awards ==
The U.S. Navy awarded Bisbee two battle stars for her World War II service and three for her Korean War service.
