= HMIS Sind =

Modified Flower-class corvette of the Royal Navy, Royal Indian Navy and Royal Thai Navy

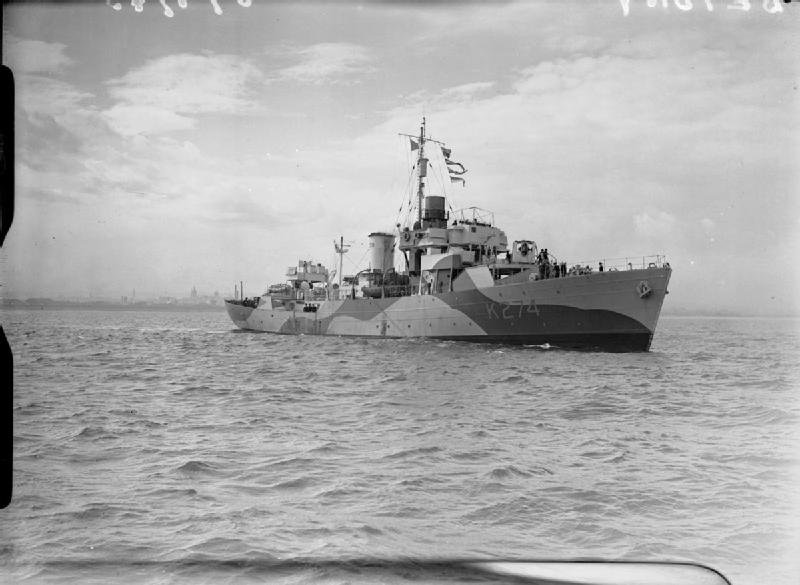
- HMS Betony underway

History

United Kingdom
- Name: Betony
- Ordered: 8 December 1941
- Builder: Alexander Hall and Sons
- Laid down: 26 September 1942
- Launched: 22 April 1943
- Commissioned: 24 August 1945
- Out of service: 1947
- Identification: Pennant number: K274
- Fate: Loaned to the Indian Navy 1945; Sold to the Royal Thai Navy 1947

British India
- Name: Sind
- Acquired: 24 August 1945
- Commissioned: 24 August 1945
- Out of service: 17 May 1946
- Identification: Pennant number: K274
- Fate: Transferred back to the Royal Navy

Thailand
- Name: Prasae
- Namesake: Prasae River
- Acquired: 1947
- Commissioned: 1947
- Out of service: 7 January 1951
- Fate: Scuttled

General characteristics
- Class & type: Flower-class corvette (modified)
- Displacement: 1,015 long tons (1,031 t; 1,137 short tons)
- Length: 208 ft (63.40 m)o/a
- Beam: 33 ft (10.06 m)
- Draught: 11 ft (3.35 m)
- Propulsion: Single shaft, 2× oil fired water tube boilers, 1 triple-expansion reciprocating steam engine, 2,750 ihp (2,050 kW)
- Speed: 16 knots (29.6 km/h)
- Range: 3,500 nautical miles (6,482 km) at 12 knots (22.2 km/h)
- Complement: 90
- Sensors & processing systems: One Type 271 SW2C radar, one Type 144 sonar
- Armament: 1 × 4 in (102 mm) BL Mk.IX single gun; 1 × 2-pounder Mk.VIII single "pom-pom"; 2 × 20 mm Oerlikon single; 1 × Hedgehog A/S mortar; 4 × Mk.II depth charge throwers; 2 Depth charge rails with 70 depth charges

HMS Betony was a Flower-class corvette of the British Royal Navy. She was ordered in 1941, and commissioned in August 1945. She was immediately transferred to the Royal Indian Navy, where she was commissioned as HMIS Sind. She was transferred back to the Royal Navy in May 1946, as the war ended just days after her transfer. She was then sold to the Royal Thai Navy in 1947 as HTMS Prasae (Thai: เรือหลวงประเเส), and eventually scuttled in 1951.

== History ==
Betony was ordered from Alexander Hall and Sons for the Royal Navy in 1941.

She was transferred to the Royal Indian Navy and the Eastern Fleet immediately upon commissioning in August 1945 and served as HMIS Sind. She developed engine trouble soon after her transfer. With the end of World War II just days after her transfer and the imminent independence of India, she was transferred back to the Royal Navy in 1946.

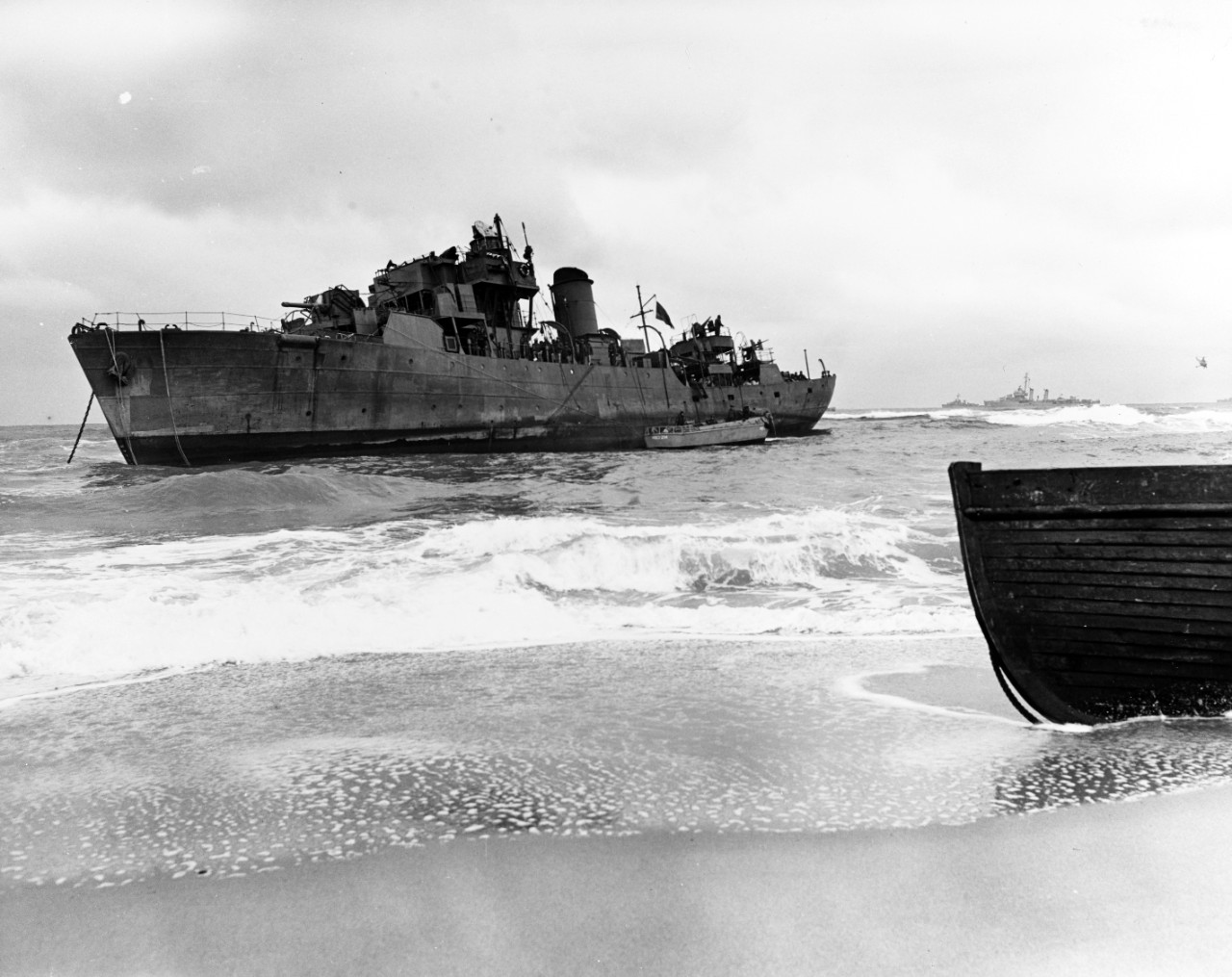
HTMS Prasae aground on the Korean east coast, January 1951

In 1947, she was sold to the Royal Thai Navy and commissioned as HTMS Prasae. On 7 January 1951, while serving in the Korean War during a snowstorm, she was beached near Yangyang on the east coast of North Korea. After unsuccessful attempts to pull her off the beach, she was scuttled.

== See also ==
- Thailand in the Korean War
