= USS Burlington (PF-51) =

Tacoma-class patrol frigate

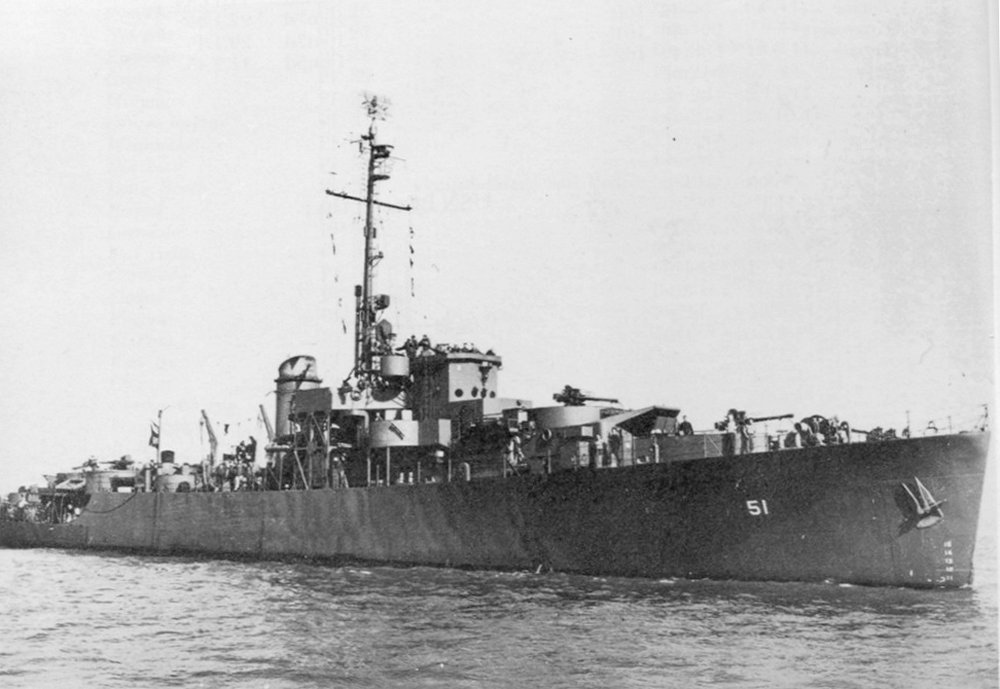
- USS Burlington (PF-51)

History

United States
- Name: Burlington
- Namesake: City of Burlington, Iowa
- Reclassified: PF-51, 15 April 1943
- Builder: Consolidated Steel Corporation, Wilmington, Los Angeles
- Yard number: 536
- Laid down: 19 October 1943
- Launched: 7 December 1943
- Sponsored by: Mrs. Florence E. Conrad
- Acquired: 31 March 1944
- Commissioned: 3 April 1944
- Decommissioned: 26 August 1945
- Honors and awards: 2 battle stars, World War II
- Fate: Transferred to Soviet Navy, 26 August 1945
- Acquired: Returned by Soviet Navy, 14 November 1949
- Recommissioned: 5 January 1951
- Decommissioned: 15 September 1952
- Honors and awards: 5 battle stars, Korean War
- Stricken: 28 May 1953
- Fate: Sold to Colombian National Armada, 26 June 1953

Soviet Union
- Name: EK-21
- Acquired: 26 August 1945
- Commissioned: 26 August 1945
- Fate: Returned to United States, 14 November 1949

Colombia
- Name: Almirante Brión
- Acquired: 26 June 1953
- Fate: Scrapped 1968

General characteristics
- Class & type: Tacoma-class frigate
- Displacement: 1,264 long tons (1,284 t)
- Length: 303 ft 11 in (92.63 m)
- Beam: 37 ft 11 in (11.56 m)
- Draft: 13 ft 8 in (4.17 m)
- Propulsion: 2 × 5,500 shp (4,101 kW) turbines; 3 boilers; 2 shafts
- Speed: 20 knots (37 km/h; 23 mph)
- Complement: 190
- Armament: 3 × 3"/50 dual purpose guns (3x1); 4 x 40 mm guns (2×2); 9 × 20 mm guns (9×1); 1 × Hedgehog anti-submarine mortar; 8 × Y-gun depth charge projectors; 2 × Depth charge tracks

USS Burlington (PF-51) was a Tacoma-class frigate in commission from 1944 to 1945 and from 1951 to 1952, the only United States Navy ship thus far to have been named for Burlington, Iowa. She also served in the Soviet Navy as EK-21 and in the Colombian National Armada as ARC Almirante Brión (F 14).

== Construction and commissioning ==
Burlington originally was authorized as a patrol gunboat with the hull number PG-159, but she was redesignated as a patrol frigate with the hull number PF-51 on 15 April 1943. She was laid down under a Maritime Commission contract as Maritime Commission Type T. S2-S2-AQ1 Hull 1462 on 19 October 1943 at the Consolidated Steel Corporation shipyard in Wilmington, Los Angeles. She was launched on 7 December 1943, sponsored by Mrs. Florence E. Conrad (wife of Max Conrad, the mayor of Burlington), acquired from the Maritime Commission by the U.S. Navy on 31 March 1944, and commissioned on 3 April 1944, with a United States Coast Guard crew.

== Service history ==
=== U.S. Navy, World War II, 1944–1945 ===
Following shakedown and post-shakedown shipyard availability, Burlington got underway from San Pedro, California, on 1 August 1944. Her first assignment took her to Espiritu Santo, where she performed patrol and escort duties in support of operations in western New Guinea. Then, from 16 October 1944 to 18 November 1944, she escorted convoys between New Guinea and the Philippine Islands in support of the invasion of Leyte. She departed the war zone on 3 December 1944 to return to California and arrived at San Francisco, California, on 25 December 1944 for repairs.

After repairs and preparations for cold-weather operations, Burlington departed San Francisco on 18 February 1945 for five months of patrol and escort duty in the Aleutian Islands. Selected for transfer to the Soviet Navy in Project Hula – a secret program for the transfer of U.S. Navy ships to the Soviet Navy at Cold Bay, Alaska, in anticipation of the Soviet Union joining the war against Japan – Burlington received orders early in the summer of 1945 to proceed to Tacoma, Washington, for repairs and alterations in preparation for her transfer. After undergoing repairs between 18 July 1945 and 2 August 1945, she headed north on 8 August 1945 for Cold Bay, where she soon began training her new Soviet crew.

=== Soviet Navy, 1945–1949 ===
Following the completion of training for her Soviet crew, Burlington was decommissioned on 26 August 1945 at Cold Bay and transferred to the Soviet Union under Lend-Lease immediately along with her sister ships USS Bisbee (PF-46), USS Gallup (PF-47), USS Rockford (PF-48), USS Muskogee (PF-49), and USS Carson City (PF-50). Commissioned into the Soviet Navy immediately, Burlington was designated as a storozhevoi korabl ("escort ship") and renamed EK-21 in Soviet service. She soon departed Cold Bay bound for Petropavlovsk-Kamchatsky in the Soviet Union, where she served as a patrol vessel in the Soviet Far East.

In February 1946, the United States began negotiations for the return of ships loaned to the Soviet Union for use during World War II. On 8 May 1947, United States Secretary of the Navy James V. Forrestal informed the United States Department of State that the United States Department of the Navy wanted 480 of the 585 combatant ships it had transferred to the Soviet Union for World War II use returned, EK-21 among them. Negotiations for the return of the ships were protracted, but on 14 November 1949 the Soviet Union finally returned EK-21 to the U.S. Navy at Yokosuka, Japan.

=== U.S. Navy, Korean War, 1951–1952 ===
Reverting to her original name, Burlington remained inactive in the Pacific Reserve Fleet at Yokosuka until after the Korean War broke out on 25 June 1950. She was then overhauled and recommissioned on 5 January 1951 at Yokosuka. After shakedown and training exercises in the Yokosuka area, Burlington deployed to the waters off Korea. From 14 March 1951 to 24 April 1951, she operated in Wonsan Harbor and off Songjin, bombarding shore targets, serving as harbor entrance control vessel, and performing patrol and escort duties.

After a brief repair period in Sasebo Navy Yard, Sasebo, Japan, Burlington returned to the combat zone and from 11 May 1951 to 8 June 1951 carried out shore bombardment and patrol duties from Wonsan to Chongjin. During the summer of 1951, she served with Task Force 92 and Task Force 77, performing escort duty in the underway replenishment area off the east coast of Korea.

Burlington entered Yokosuka Navy Yard for overhaul late in September 1951 and returned to escort duty in Korean waters on 5 December 1951. Until early July 1952, she continued combat operations, periodically returning to Sasebo for repairs and training.

Burlington departed Sasebo on 3 July 1952 bound for the Philippine Islands, where she participated in exercises off the west coast of Luzon and cruised as far south as Davao on Mindanao. She departed Manila Bay on 3 September 1952 to return to Yokosuka, where she was decommissioned on 15 September 1952. Her name was stricken from the Navy List on 28 May 1953.

=== Colombian Navy, 1953–1968 ===
The United States sold Burlington to the government of Colombia on 26 June 1953. She operated with the Colombian Navy under the name ARC Almirante Brión (F 14).

Almirante Brión was scrapped in 1968.

== Honors and awards ==
The U.S. Navy awarded Burlington two battle stars for her World War II service and five battle stars for her Korean War service.
