= USS Groton (PF-29) =

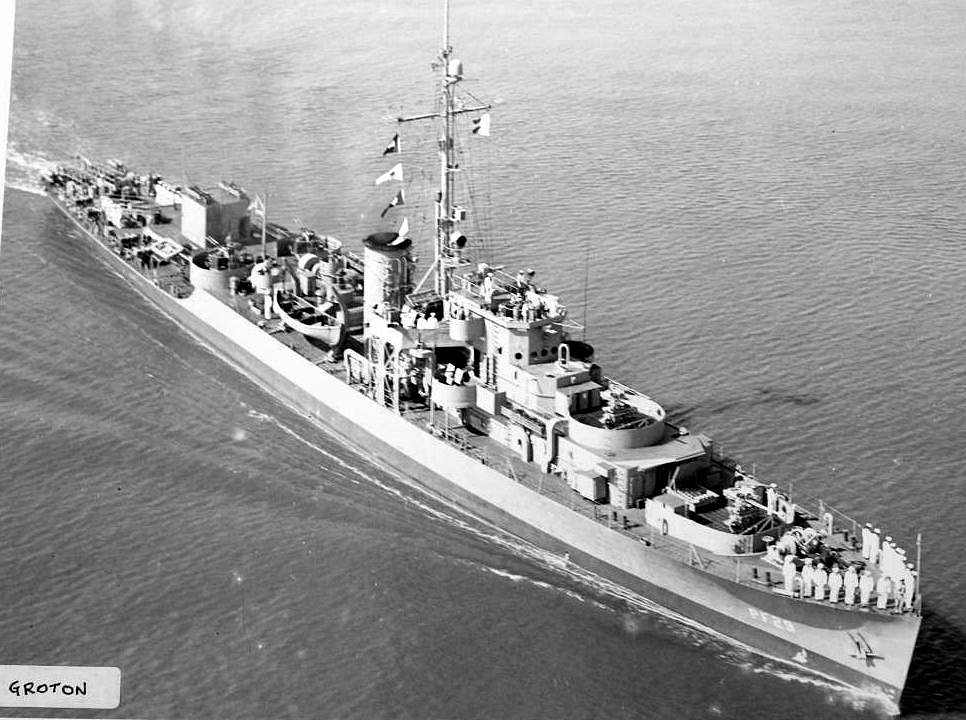
- Groton underway

History

United States
- Name: Groton
- Namesake: City of Groton, Connecticut
- Builder: Walter Butler Shipbuilding Co., Superior, Wisconsin
- Laid down: 15 July 1943
- Launched: 14 September 1943
- Commissioned: 5 September 1944
- Decommissioned: 13 March 1946
- Reclassified: PF-29, 15 April 1943
- Fate: Sold to Colombia, 26 March 1947

Colombia
- Name: Almirante Padilla
- Namesake: José Prudencio Padilla
- Acquired: 26 March 1947
- Fate: Stricken 1965

General characteristics
- Class & type: Tacoma-class frigate
- Displacement: 1,430 long tons (1,453 t) light; 2,415 long tons (2,454 t) full
- Length: 303 ft 11 in (92.63 m)
- Beam: 37 ft 6 in (11.43 m)
- Draft: 13 ft 8 in (4.17 m)
- Propulsion: 2 × 5,500 shp (4,101 kW) turbines; 3 boilers; 2 shafts
- Speed: 20 knots (37 km/h; 23 mph)
- Complement: 190
- Armament: 3 × 3"/50 dual purpose guns (3x1); 4 x 40 mm guns (2×2); 9 × 20 mm guns (9×1); 1 × Hedgehog anti-submarine mortar; 8 × Y-gun depth charge projectors; 2 × Depth charge tracks

USS Groton (PF-29), a Tacoma-class frigate, was the first ship of the United States Navy to be named for Groton, Connecticut.

== Construction ==
Groton (PF-29), formerly classified as PG-137, was launched under Maritime Commission contract by Walter Butler Shipbuilding Company, Inc., in Superior, Wisconsin, on 14 September 1943, sponsored by Mrs. Percy Palmer; and commissioned on 5 September 1944.

== Service history ==
=== United States ===
After shakedown training off Bermuda, Groton reported for Atlantic duty on 30 October 1944. She departed for her first duty station on 2 November, arriving in NS Argentia, Newfoundland, three days later. The ship sailed on 6 November for her weather station in the north Atlantic, sending important reports to allied weather stations and helping to guide wartime traffic safely to Europe. Groton remained on this duty, based at Argentia, until sailing for Boston, Massachusetts, on 7 February 1945. She had but a short respite, and was back on her weather station 10 days later.

Groton performed weather picket duty in the Atlantic until 15 November 1945 when she returned to Boston for transfer to the United States Coast Guard. The ship simultaneously decommissioned from the United States Navy and commissioned in the Coast Guard on 13 March 1946. Serving the Coast Guard on loan, Groton again was assigned to weather duty off Argentia until decommissioning on 25 September at New Orleans, Louisiana.

After being moved to Lake Charles, Louisiana, in November, Groton returned to New Orleans in January 1947. Turned over to the State Department for disposal, she was sold to the Government of Colombia on 26 March 1947, where she served as in the Colombian Navy as ARC Almirante Padilla (FG 11).

=== Colombia ===
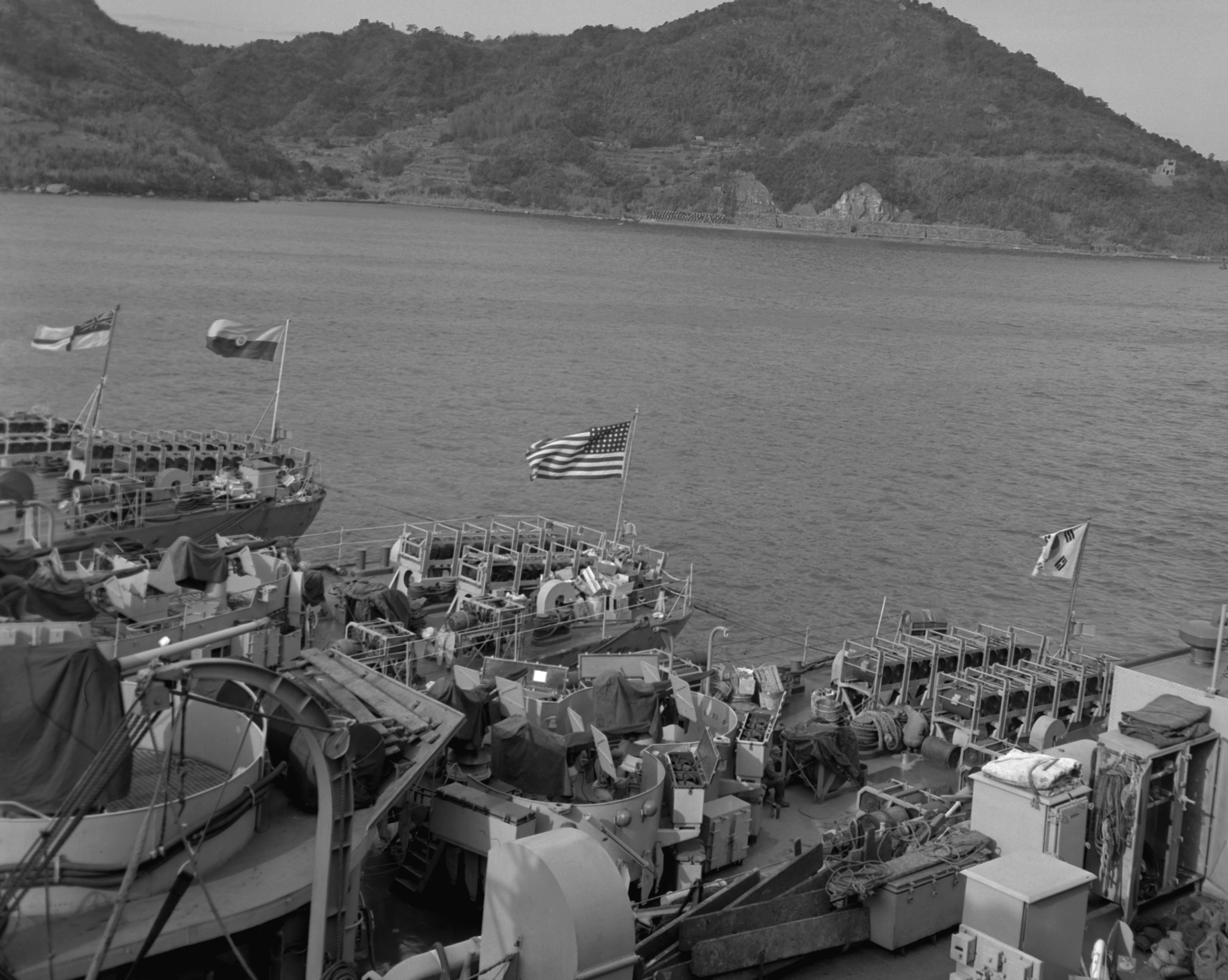
Ships of four nations alongside the US Navy repair ship Jason at the Han Estuary, South Korea, 16 January 1952. The ships (L-R) are: HMAS Murchison, ARC Almirante Padilla, USS Gloucester and ROKS Taedong.

Almirante Padilla joined the multi-national United Nations forces during the Korean War. After refitting in San Diego, and a joint U.S.-Colombian exercise at Pearl Harbor, Almirante Padilla joined the 7th Fleet's Task Force 95 on 8 May 1951, and was assigned to patrol duties on the west coast of Korea. Padilla was transferred to the east coast on 14 June to patrol close inshore off Wonsan, and later was assigned the coast south of Songjin. Almirante Padilla's tour of duty ended on 19 January 1952, when she sailed to Yokosuka, where she was relieved by her sister ship ARC Capitan Tono.

Almirante Padilla was disposed of in 1965.
