= 902 Infantry Brigade =

Royal Thai Army unit

902 Infantry Brigade, King's Royal Guard
- กรมทหารราบ 902 รักษาพระองค์ ในพระบาทสมเด็จพระเจ้าอยู่หัว
- Emblem of the 902 Infantry Brigade, King's Royal Guard
- Active: 1950–present
- Country: Thailand
- Branch: Royal Thai Army
- Type: King's Guard; Mechanized infantry
- Size: Brigade (Regiment)
- Part of: 2nd Infantry Division
- Garrison/HQ: Chonburi, Thailand
- Nicknames: Phayak Noi (พยัคฆ์น้อย, Little Tigers); Chong-Ang Suek (จงอางศึก, Queen's Cobra); Thahan Suea Rachini (ทหารเสือราชินี, the queen's tiger soldiers); Maha Vajiralongkorn Rajavallobh (มหาวชิราลงกรณราชวัลลภ, King Vajiralongkorn's close bodyguards)
- Colors: Purple
- March: We-Infantry Regiment 21
- Engagements: Cold War; Korean War; Third Battle of Seoul; Battle of Pork Chop Hill; Vietnam War; Tet Offensive; Communist insurgency in Thailand; Vietnamese border raids in Thailand; Southern Insurgency; Cambodian–Thai border dispute; 2025 Cambodia–Thailand conflict
- Decorations: The Rama Medal for Gallantry in Action Bravery Medal (2nd Battalion) Presidential Unit Citation (United States) Republic of Korea Presidential Unit Citation

The 902 Infantry Regiment, King's Royal Guard, formerly the 21st Infantry Regiment, Queen's Guard (Thai: กรมทหารราบ 902 รักษาพระองค์ ในพระบาทสมเด็จพระเจ้าอยู่หัว) (ร.902 รอ.) is the elite (special operations capable) mechanized infantry brigade under the 2nd Infantry Division, King Vajiralongkorn's Guard of the Royal Thai Army (RTA). They are trained like special operations forces. The brigade was created in 1950. It is known as the Queens' Tiger's or Thahan Suea Rachini (Thai: ทหารเสือราชินี, translated as "Queen's Tiger Soldiers"). It is sometimes referred to as the "Eastern Tigers". The brigade is based in Chonburi.

== History ==
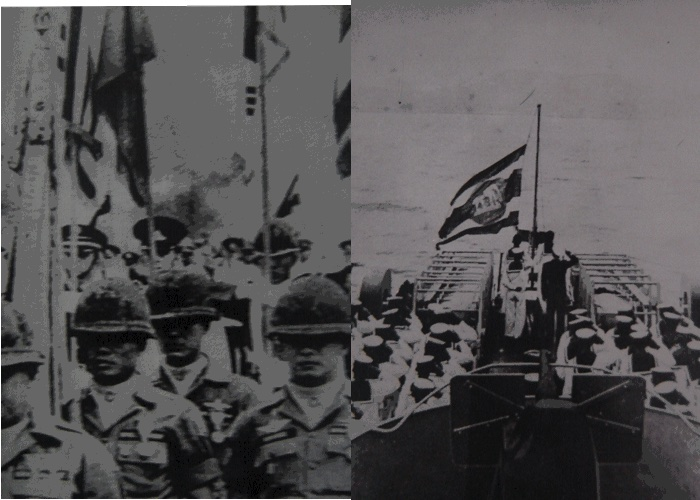
Thai Battalion in the Korean War (1950–1953)

The 1st Infantry Battalion of the 21st Regimental Combat Team was formed on 22 September 1950 by the regent, Rangsit Prayurasakdi, under executive of Prime Minister Plaek Phibunsongkhram, at the request of United Nations Command (UNC).

Its purpose was to help the US-led United Nations Forces fight the Korean People's Army (KPA) and the Chinese People's Volunteers (CPV) in the Korean War. Keeping the justice and the peace of the world was the founding mission of this order. After the war, on 1 August 1955, the group was transferred into Bangkok area.

On 1 August 1959, it changed a status to the 1st Infantry Battalion of 21st Infantry Regiment, Queen Sirikit's Guard, and on 31 July 1968, moved the base to the Fort Nawamintharachini at Chonburi Province. On 1 October 2011, its unit strength changed from a three infantry battalion to a one mechanized infantry battalion and two elites infantry battalion.

During the 2025 Cambodia-Thailand conflict, the brigade was involved in offensive operations. After the passing of Queen Sirikit, King Vajiralongkorn changed the names of 18 King's Guard's Units, including changing the 21st Infantry Brigade, Queen Sirikit's Guards to 902 Infantry Brigade, King's Royal Guard effective from 28th of January 2026.

== Campaigns ==
ฺBadge of the Royal Thai Volunteer Regiment "Queen's Cobra"

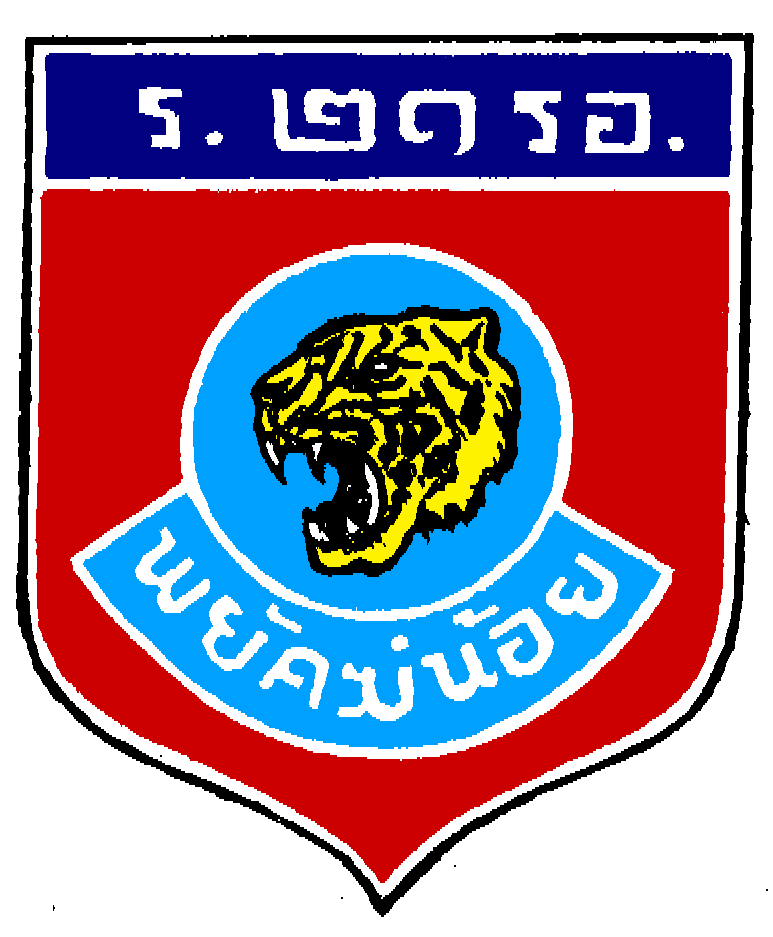
Old badge of 21st Infantry Regiment in 1981 with the motto "Little Tigers".

- Korean War service called "Little Tigers" in Battle of Pork Chop Hill. They received 12 Silver Stars, 1 Aircraft Order of Merit, and 26 Bronze Star Medals.
- Voluntary service in the Vietnam War in 1968-1969 Called the "Queen's Cobra".
- Suppressed communist terrorists and helped civilians in Nan Province in 1975.
- Received the Order of Rama for stopping Vietnamese border incursions on the Thai-Cambodian border in 1983.

== Organization ==
The regiment is composed of three subordinate units: the 1st, 2nd, and 3rd Infantry Battalions.

- 1st Mechanized Infantry Battalion, 902 Infantry Brigade, King's Royal Guard
- 2nd Infantry Battalion, 902 Infantry Brigade, King's Royal Guard
- 3rd Infantry Battalion, 902 Infantry Brigade, King's Royal Guard

== Uniform ==
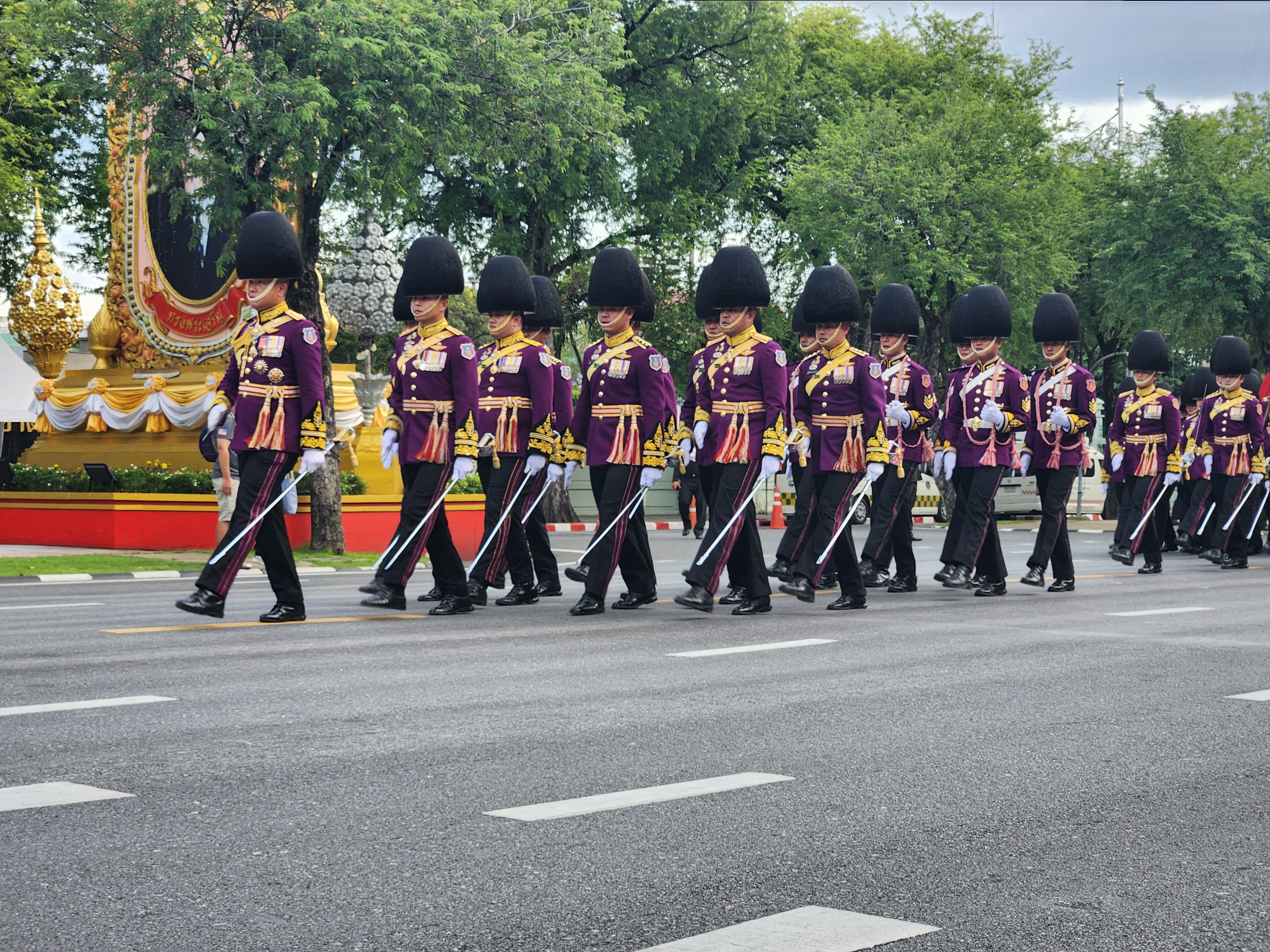
Full dress of the 21st Infantry Regiment.

Past (21st Infantry Regiment, Queen's Guard Era):

- Guards Pith Helmet with black plumes with the royal cypher of the queen.
- Purple woolen top with black woolen mane embroidered with the queen's cypher on the wrist.
- Black woolen trousers with two purple stripes per side.

Present (902nd Infantry Brigade, King's Royal Guard Era):

- Guards Pith Helmet with black plumes with the royal cypher of the king.
- Red woolen top with black woolen mane embroidered with the queen's cypher on the wrist.
- Black woolen trousers.

== Training ==
=== Selection ===
Trainee must serve in the 21st Regiment Queen's Guard or be permitted by the Royal Thai Army to attend training.

=== Training content ===
The Queen's Tigers run a training course every two years. Its duration is 23 weeks.

- Physical and mental conditioning in preparation for the next phase (5 weeks): This phase focuses on basic abseiling, basic counterterrorism, basic defusing and disposal of bombs, basic hand-to-hand combat, basic parachuting, basic small unit tactics, fast tactical shooting, first aid, hand and arm signals, intelligence collection, marksmanship, tactical diving, and use a map and compass. Learn the languages of neighboring countries. NBCR on operations in contaminated environments. Physical exercises. Swimming. Only those who passing this phase move to the next phase.
- Forest and mountain training (4 weeks): This phase focuses on infiltration by air and ground. Abseiling, counter-ambushes, exfil, defusing and disposal of bombs and land mines, forward observer, guerrilla warfare, infiltrate the area with a helicopter, jungle warfare, living off the jungle, mountain warfare, raiding tactics, reconnaissance tactics, riding a horse, SERE, small unit tactics, tactical emergency medical services, tracking tactics, use a map and compass, and unconventional tactics.
- Sea phase (3 weeks): Water infiltration and tactical diving. Amphibious reconnaissance, amphibious warfare, coastal patrolling, helocasting, living off the sea, parachuting into water, and underwater diving.
- Urban phase (5 weeks): Characteristics and choice of explosives and the amount and mode of use to minimize collateral damage, climbing in different situations using ropes, combat and patrolling techniques in urban areas, counterterrorism, CQB and CQC, fast-roping, hostage rescue, reconnaissance in urban areas, tactical shooting the PPC, tactical use of motorbikes, urban warfare, usage of explosives in the presence of hostages, use of explosives and other techniques for breaking doors, and use ladders climbing.
- Air phase (6 weeks): Parachuting, parachute packing and problem solving.

=== Award for completion ===
Badge of the "Queen's Tiger Soldier" training course.

Those who successfully complete the tiger training course receive a military capabilities plate from the queen. The metal plate is decorated with a purple heart and the queen's cypher. The lower part is a blue ribbon contain the honorific "Tiger Soldier". To both sides of the purple heart are tigers soaring above mountains, waves, and clouds.

== Missions ==
- Collect intelligence in a special gathering manner.
- Counter-sabotage and riot control.
- Counterterrorism and hostage rescue.
- Create masses in the infiltration area.
- Operating behind enemy lines.
- Protection of The Royal Family and VIP.
- Spearheaded the combat in battlefield.
- Suppress insurgents in all terrains by infiltrating air, land, and water.

== Political influence ==
In the 1990s, according to one academic, "...the Eastern Tigers amassed considerable wealth by trading gems with Cambodian Khmer Rouge insurgents based along the two countries' border, a racket which 'directly benefited'... some of its commanders. Within a decade, the Eastern Tigers dominated the Thai military." The Queen's Guard have since had an inordinate influence on Thai politics. Former Queen's Guard commanders led the May 2014 Thai coup d'état that toppled the elected government.

Thai military junta, leader of the 2014 Thai coup d'état, Thai Prime Minister Prayut Chan-o-cha also started his military career at 21st Infantry Regiment in 1990, which is granted Royal Guards status as the Queen's Guards. In 2002, Prayut served as a deputy commanding general in the 2nd Infantry Division, becoming its commanding general one year later.

== See also ==
- Thailand in the Korean War
- Prayut Chan-o-cha
