= USS Gallup (PF-47) =

Tacoma-class patrol frigate

Coordinates: 12.696940°N 101.704598°E

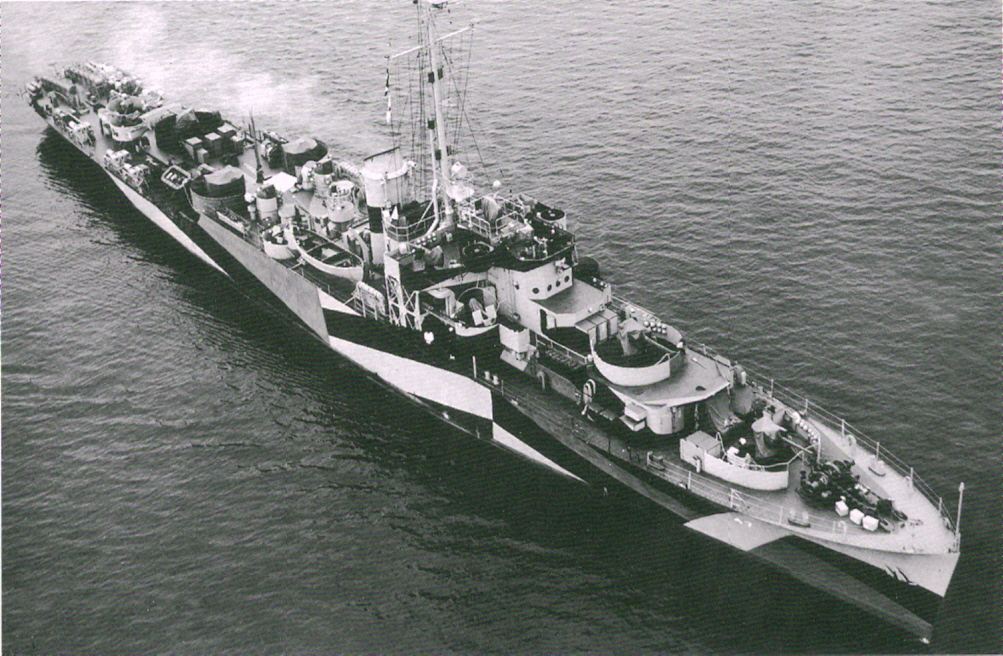
- USS Gallup (PF-47) at San Pedro, California, on 30 May 1944. The US Navy Bureau of Ships conceived the camouflage scheme of dull black, ocean gray, light gray, and deck blue in which she is painted specifically for her.

History

United States
- Name: Gallup
- Namesake: City of Gallup, New Mexico
- Builder: Consolidated Steel Corporation, Wilmington, Los Angeles
- Yard number: 532
- Laid down: 18 August 1943
- Launched: 17 September 1943
- Sponsored by: Ensign Helen McMahon, NNRC
- Commissioned: 29 February 1944
- Decommissioned: 26 August 1945
- Identification: PG-155; PF-47 (15 April 1943)
- Honors and awards: 2 battle stars, World War II
- Fate: Transferred to Soviet Navy 26 August 1945
- Acquired: Returned by Soviet Navy, 14 November 1949
- Recommissioned: 18 October 1950
- Decommissioned: 29 October 1951
- Honors and awards: 3 battle stars, Korean War
- Fate: Transferred to Royal Thai Navy, 29 October 1951

Soviet Union
- Name: EK-22
- Acquired: 26 August 1945
- Commissioned: 26 August 1945
- Fate: Returned to United States, 14 November 1949

Thailand
- Name: Prasae
- Namesake: Prasae River
- Acquired: 29 October 1951
- Reclassified: PF-412
- Decommissioned: 22 June 2000
- Identification: PF 2
- Fate: Preserved
- Status: On display as a memorial at the Prasae River, Rayong Province, since 27 December 2003

General characteristics
- Class & type: Tacoma-class frigate
- Displacement: 1,430 long tons (1,453 t) light; 2,415 long tons (2,454 t) full
- Length: 303 ft 11 in (92.63 m)
- Beam: 37 ft 6 in (11.43 m)
- Draft: 13 ft 8 in (4.17 m)
- Propulsion: 2 × 5,500 shp (4,101 kW) turbines; 3 boilers; 2 shafts
- Speed: 20 knots (37 km/h; 23 mph)
- Complement: 190
- Armament: 3 × 3 in (76 mm)/50 dual purpose guns (3x1); 4 x 40 mm (1.6 in) guns (2×2); 9 × 20 mm (0.79 in) guns (9×1); 1 × Hedgehog anti-submarine mortar; 8 × Y-gun depth charge projectors; 2 × Depth charge tracks

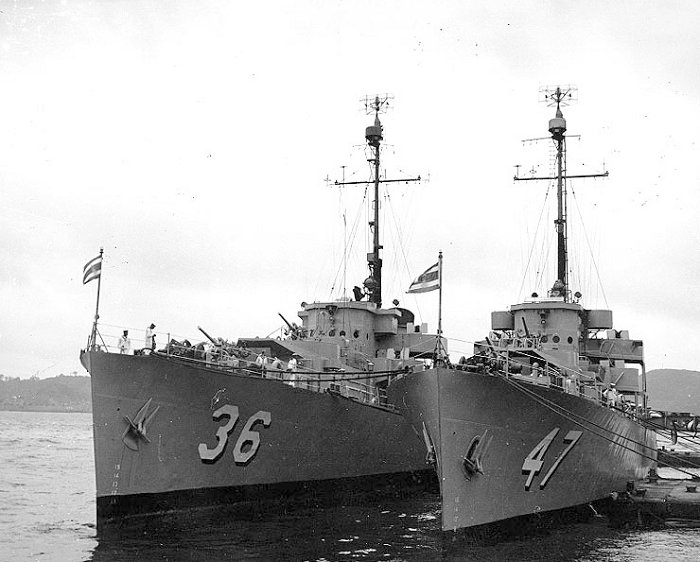
The Tacoma-class patrol frigates Glendale (left) and Gallup during the ceremony for their transfer to the Royal Thai Navy on 29 October 1951

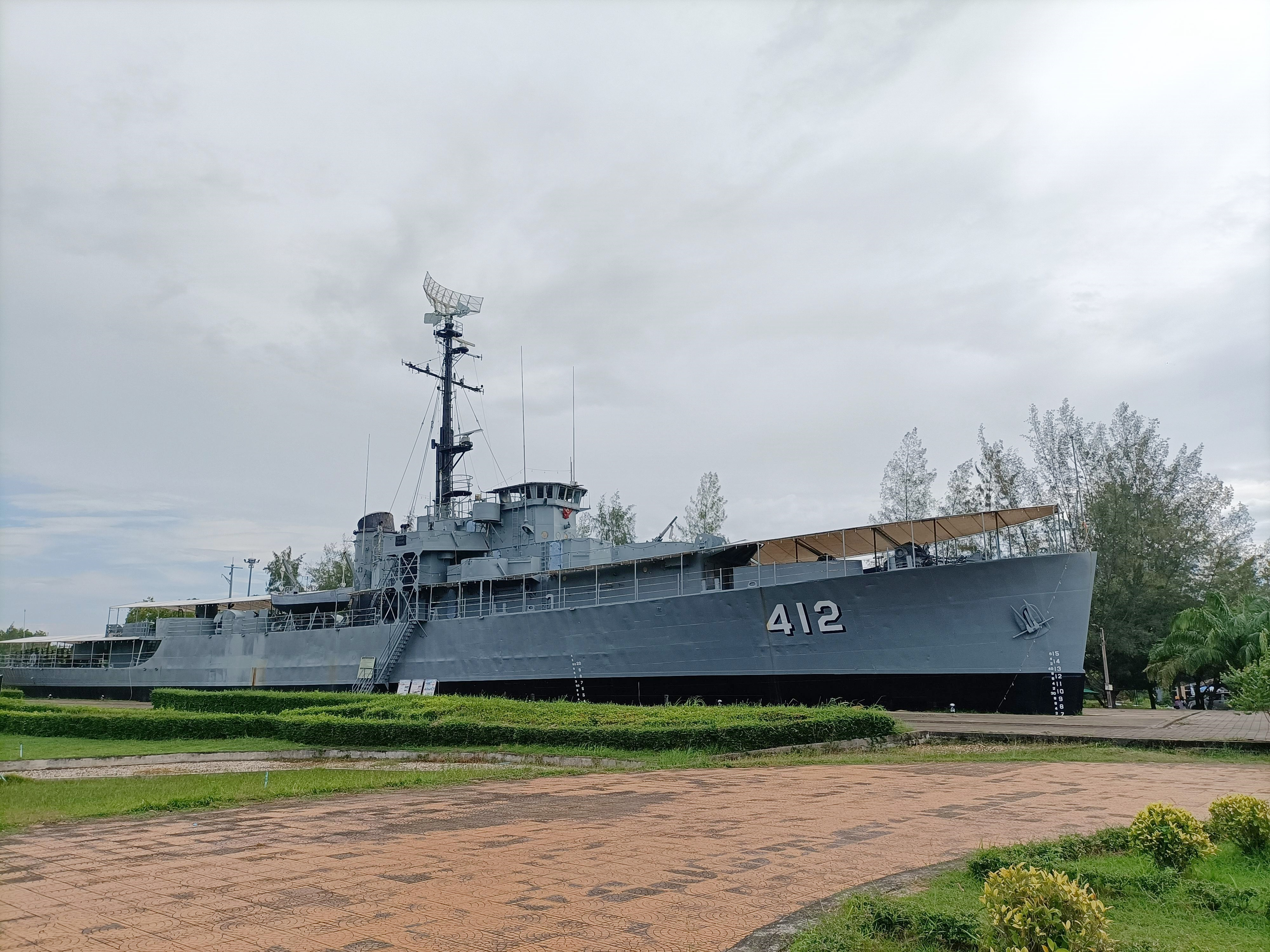
HTMS Prasae (PF 2) Memorial, Pak Nam Krasae, Klaeng District, Rayong, Thailand

The second USS Gallup (PF-47), a Tacoma-class frigate in commission from 1944 to 1945 and from 1950 to 1951, was the first ship of the United States Navy to be named for Gallup, New Mexico. She also served in the Soviet Navy as EK-22 and in the Royal Thai Navy as HTMS Prasae (PF 2).

== Construction and commissioning ==
Originally classified as a patrol gunboat, PG-155, Gallup was reclassified as a patrol frigate, PF-47, on 15 April 1943. She was launched on 17 September 1943, at the Consolidated Steel Corporation shipyard in Los Angeles, California, sponsored by Ensign Helen McMahon, NNRC, and commissioned on 29 February 1944, at San Pedro, California.

== Service history ==
=== U.S. Navy, World War II, 1944–1945 ===
Following conversion work at Newport Beach, California, and shakedown out of San Pedro and San Diego, California, Gallup departed San Diego on 1 June 1944, for the Pacific war zone. Conducting anti-submarine patrol en route, she arrived at Nouméa, New Caledonia, on 21 June 1944, and began escort and patrol duties in the waters of New Caledonia, New Guinea, and Australia with Escort Division 43. On 17 August 1944, she bombarded enemy strongholds to support landings on Biak Island at Blue Beach, north of the Wardo River by units of the United States Army's 41st Infantry Division; she continued to fire until the troops had completed their landing and secured the beach. Again, on 25 August 1944, Gallup lent support to the conquest of Biak by shelling the beaches between Menoerar and Cape Warari. After Biak had been secured, she returned to her duties with Escort Division 43 until 12 October 1944.

Departing Hollandia, New Guinea, on 12 October 1944, Gallup was part of the screen for the task force which mounted the invasion of Leyte in the Philippine Islands. On 17 October 1944, she shelled the beach area of Dinagat, and the next day she swept the channel into Leyte Gulf as U.S. forces poised for the invasion. She then began anti-submarine and anti-mine patrol near Black Beach, screening vessels engaged in landing operations. Stationed most of the time off Desolation Point, she collected tide and hydrographic information, served as dispatch boat and as escort through the cleared channel in Leyte Gulf, guided incoming ships and convoys through the channel, and served as harbor entrance control vessel during landing operations. She performed these duties, most of the time in gusty, stormy weather, with her sister ship Bisbee and the large infantry landing craft LCI(L)-343 and LCI(L)-344, before being sent on an escort mission to Humboldt Bay, New Guinea, on 28 November 1944, touching San Pedro Bay in the Philippines, Kossol Roads in the Palau Islands, and Manus in the Admiralty Islands en route.

On 3 December 1944, Gallup departed for the United States West Coast, stopping to drop men at Seeadler Harbor in the Admiralty Islands and at Pearl Harbor, Territory of Hawaii. She arrived at San Francisco, California, on 25 December 1944.

Departing San Francisco on 9 January 1945, Gallup steamed via Seattle, Washington, to Dutch Harbor, Territory of Alaska, where she arrived on 20 January 1945. She then patrolled the North Pacific Ocean. Selected for transfer to the Soviet Navy in Project Hula – a secret program for the transfer of U.S. Navy ships to the Soviet Navy at Cold Bay, Alaska, in anticipation of the Soviet Union joining the war against Japan – Gallup proceeded to Cold Bay, in August 1945, to begin training her new Soviet crew.

=== Soviet Navy, 1945–1949 ===
Following the completion of training for her Soviet crew, Gallup was decommissioned on 26 August 1945 at Cold Bay and transferred to the Soviet Union under Lend-Lease immediately along with her sister ships Bisbee, Rockford, Muskogee, Carson City, and Burlington. Commissioned into the Soviet Navy immediately, Gallup was designated as a storozhevoi korabl ("escort ship") and renamed EK-22 in Soviet service. She soon departed Cold Bay bound for Petropavlovsk-Kamchatsky in the Soviet Union, where she arrived on 5 September 1945, too late to see World War II service with the Soviets. She served as a patrol vessel in the Soviet Far East.

In February 1946, the United States began negotiations for the return of ships loaned to the Soviet Union for use during World War II. On 8 May 1947, United States Secretary of the Navy James V. Forrestal informed the United States Department of State that the United States Department of the Navy wanted 480 of the 585 combatant ships it had transferred to the Soviet Union for World War II use returned, EK-22 among them. Negotiations for the return of the ships were protracted, but on 14 November 1949 the Soviet Union finally returned EK-22 to the U.S. Navy at Yokosuka, Japan.

=== U.S. Navy, Korean War, 1950–1951 ===
Reverting to her original name, Gallup lay idle in the Pacific Reserve Fleet at Yokosuka until recommissioned on 18 October 1950 for service in the Korean War. After shakedown off Sagami Wan, Japan, she got under way with Bisbee on 23 November 1950 for Hungnam, Korea. There she relieved her sister ship Hoquiam as harbor entrance control vessel, escorting ships when directed, guarding the channel against unfriendly ships, preventing friendly vessels from entering mined areas, and performing search and rescue services for the many refugees flooding through the area.

On 19 December 1950, Gallup left for Pusan, where she performed anti-submarine patrol on the approaches to the harbor, before leaving on 31 December 1950 for Sasebo, Japan. On 29 January 1951, she returned to Korea, this time to Kansang and Kosong to participate in a feint intended to divert Communist forces by making them think an amphibious assault was imminent, conducting what was designed to look like a pre-assault bombardment against installations at Kansang and Kosong.

Gallup continued to operate out of Sasebo, making escort, patrol, and guide tours to Pusan, Wonsan, and Chongjin, Korea, and to Sangley Point and Subic Bay on Luzon in the Philippine Islands. She helped in the bombardment of Wonsan from 23 through 25 February 1951 as United Nations forces seized the harbor islands, and then served as harbor entrance control vessel and "flycatcher," in the latter role patrolling against enemy small boats, combat swimmers, and suicide attack craft. Returning to Yokosuka on 14 March 1951, she entered dry dock there for extensive hull repairs. Returning to Korea, she continued similar duty off the Korean coast until she returned to Yokosuka on 6 October 1951.

=== Royal Thai Navy, 1951–2000 ===
Gallup was decommissioned and transferred under the Mutual Defense Assistance Act along with her sister ship Glendale to Thailand at Yokosuka on 29 October 1951, and served thereafter in the Royal Thai Navy as HTMS Prasae (PF 2). Prasae remained in service until struck from the Thai Navy Register and decommissioned on 22 June 2000.

== Museum ship ==
Prasae initially was preserved as a memorial at the Sattahip Naval Base, then was towed to the mouth of the Prasae River in Rayong Province, its namesake, and put on display there by the Prasae River Communities Committee on 27 December 2003, as the "HTMS Prasae Memorial".

== Awards ==
The U.S. Navy awarded Gallup two battle stars for her World War II service and three battle stars for her Korean War service.
