= Pak Nam Krasae =

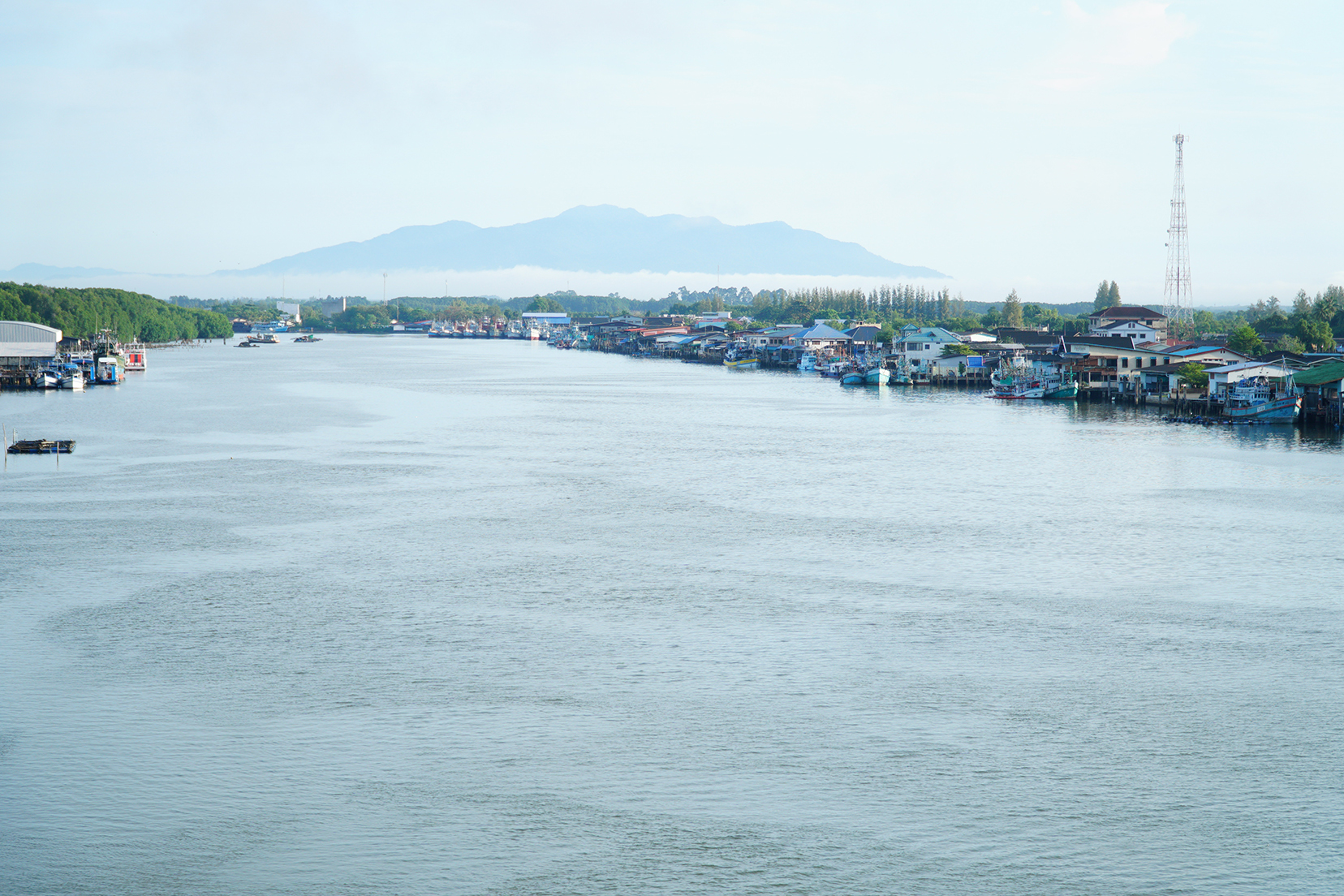
Prasae River, the right side is Pak Nam Krasae

Pak Nam Krasae (Thai: ปากน้ำกระแส, pronounced [pàːk náːm krā.sɛ̌ː]) is a tambon (sub-district) of Klaeng District, Rayong Province in eastern Thailand.

== History ==
"Pak Nam Krasae", also known as "Pak Nam Prasae," (ปากน้ำประแส, [pàːk náːm prā.sɛ̌ː]) literally means "estuary of the Krasae (Prasae) River," reflecting the nature of its terrain. It is an ancient community dating back to the Ayutthaya period, with a history of more than 200 years.

The name is believed to derive from the Chong word Sae (แซรฺ), meaning "rice field".

Pak Nam Krasae is a riverside community rich in natural resources and cultural diversity. Its population is composed of both Thai and Thai-Chinese residents. The community includes both waterfront and inland areas.

== Geography ==
Pak Nam Krasae has an area of 3,037.50 rais (4.866 square kilometers). It is located in the southeast of Klaeng District, away from district office southeastward along Sukhumvit Road (Highway 3) about 17 km (10.6 mi) and about 63 km (39.1 mi) from Rayong City via Sukhumvit Road, with about 200 km (124.3 mi) from Bangkok.

The contact territories are as follows (from north clockwise): Khlong Pun, Phang Rat, Prasae River (empties into the Gulf of Thailand), and Neun Kho.

Prasae (Krasae) River is a main watercourse of the area. The river is about 45 km (28.0 mi) long, originating from the mountains in Chanthaburi Province, currents into Rayong through many creeks and canals, as far as empties into the Gulf of Thailand at Pak Nam Krasae. The distance flows through Pak Nam Krasae is about 8 km (5.0 mi).

Most of the area is a coastal plain that slopes down to the Gulf of Thailand southward, which has an indented coastline adjacent to the Gulf of Thailand, approximately 3 km (1.9 mi) long.

Pak Nam Krasae is also rich in mangrove forests.

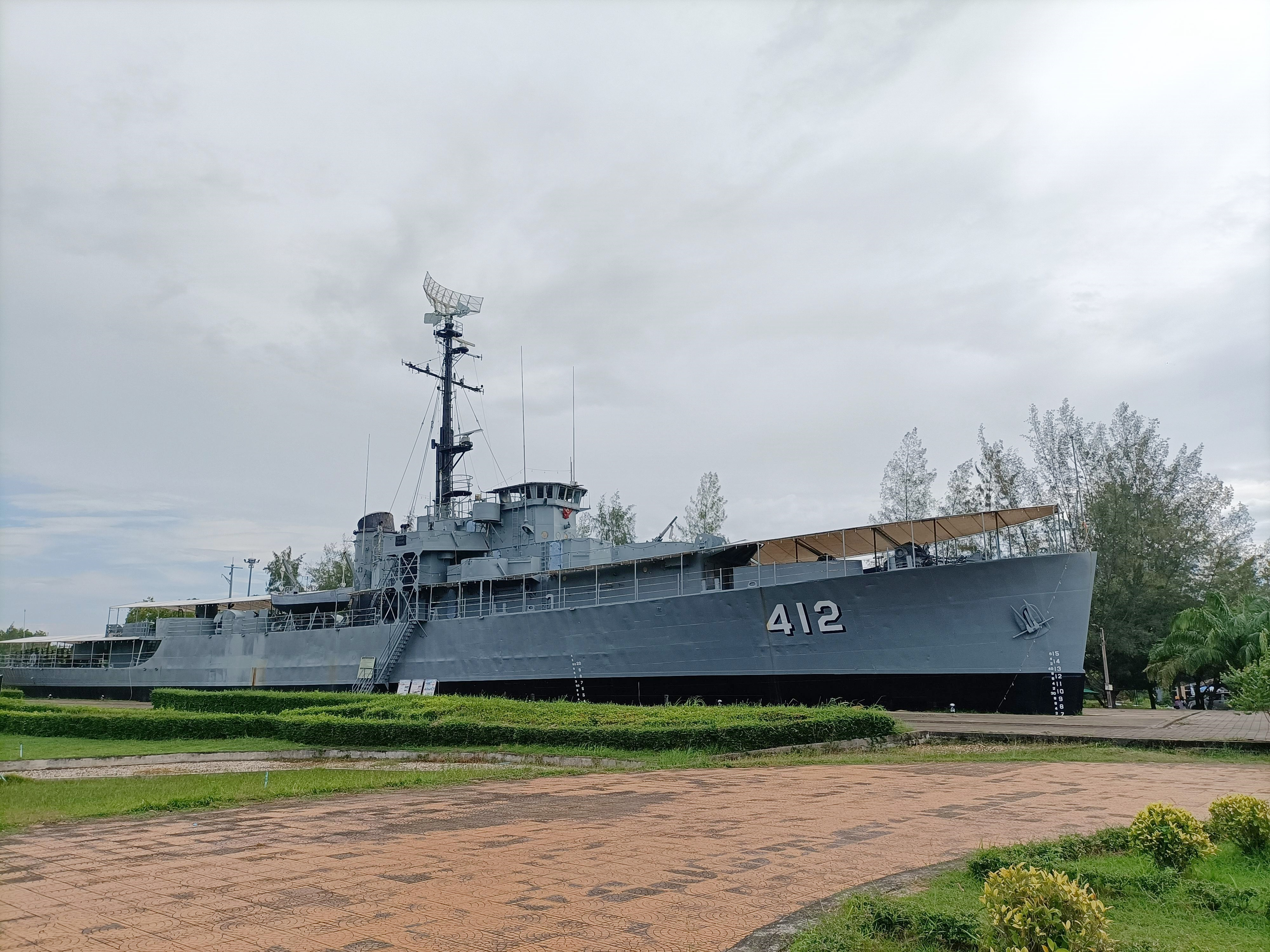
HTMS Prasae (PF 2) Memorial at Pak Nam Krasae

== Administration ==
The area is governed by the Subdistrict-Municipality Pak Nam Prasae (เทศบาลตำบลปากน้ำประแส).

== Economy ==
Almost half of the population who live along the waterfront are fishing. While the people who settled in the area and are not adjacent to the waterfront, work as rice farmers and orchard cultivators. The tourism industry is another important source of income for the local.

== Notable places ==
- Tung Prongthong (mangrove forest)
- HTMS Prasae (PF 2) Memorial
- Wat Sommuttithep Thapanaram Temple
- Laem Son Beach
- Prasae Sin Bridge
- Wat Takian Ngam Temple and Ancient Takian Tree
- Prince Abhakara Kiartivongse Shrine

== Local traditions ==
- Water Kathina (corresponds to Loy Krathong)
- Make Merit In The Boat
