= List of patrol vessels of the United States Navy =

Ships of the United States Navy

Ships in current service
- Current ships

Ships grouped alphabetically
- A–B; C; D–F; G–H; I–K; L; M; N–O; P; Q–R; S; T–V; W–Z

Ships grouped by type
- Aircraft carriers; Airships; Amphibious warfare ships; Auxiliaries; Battlecruisers; Battleships; Cruisers; Destroyers; Destroyer escorts; Destroyer leaders; Escort carriers; Frigates; Hospital ships; Littoral combat ships; Mine warfare vessels; Monitors; Oilers; Patrol vessels; Registered civilian vessels; Sailing frigates; Steam frigates; Steam gunboats; Ships of the line; Sloops of war; Submarines; Torpedo boats; Torpedo retrievers; Unclassified miscellaneous; Yard and district craft

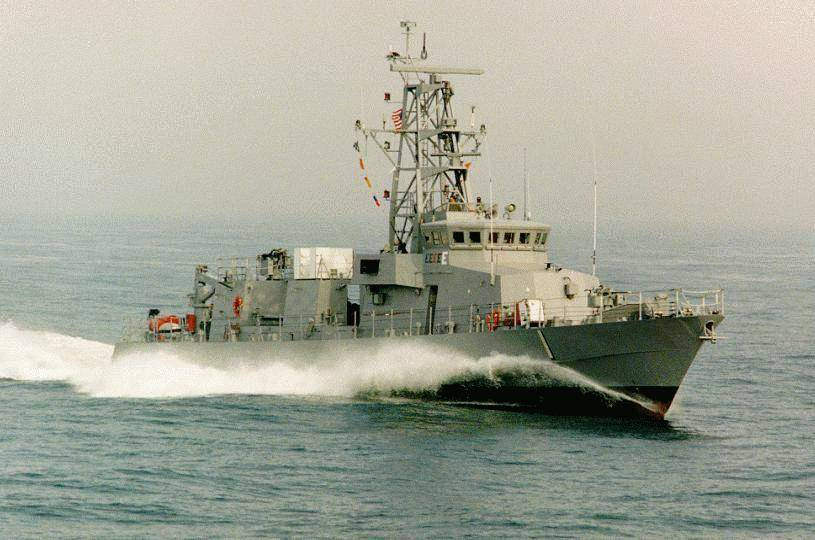
USS Cyclone (PC-1)

This is a list of patrol vessels of the United States Navy.

Ship status is indicated as either currently active [A] (including ready reserve), inactive [I], or precommissioning [P]. Ships in the inactive category include only ships in the inactive reserve, ships which have been disposed from US service have no listed status. Ships in the precommissioning category include ships under construction or on order.

== Assault Support Patrol Boat (ASPB) ==
Eighty-six Assault Support Patrol Boats were built for use in the Vietnam War.

== Patrol air cushion vehicle (PACV) ==
The Navy used 3 Patrol Air Cushion Vehicle hovercraft in Vietnam.

== Hydrofoil vessels ==
=== Patrol craft hydrofoil (PCH) ===
- USS High Point (PCH-1) (Boeing)

=== Patrol gunboat hydrofoil (PGH) ===
- USS Flagstaff (PGH-1) (Grumman experimental class)
- USS Tucumcari (PGH-2) (Boeing, JetFoil predecessor)

=== Patrol missile hydrofoil (PHM) ===
Pegasus class

- USS Pegasus (PHM-1), ex-Delphinus
- USS Hercules (PHM-2)
- USS Taurus (PHM-3)
- USS Aquila (PHM-4)
- USS Aries (PHM-5)
- USS Gemini (PHM-6)

== Patrol boat, river (PBR) ==
The Patrol Boat, River was acquired for the Vietnam War: 718 of these 31/32-foot long boats were purchased with a peak of 250 used in Vietnam.

== Patrol craft coastal (PC) ==
The original PC hull number sequence ended in 1964, and was then restarted with '1' for this class.

Cyclone-class

- USS Cyclone (PC-1)
- USS Tempest (PC-2)
- USS Hurricane (PC-3)
- USS Monsoon (PC-4)
- USS Typhoon (PC-5)
- USS Sirocco (PC-6)
- USS Squall (PC-7)
- USS Zephyr (PC-8)
- USS Chinook (PC-9)
- USS Firebolt (PC-10)
- USS Whirlwind (PC-11)
- USS Thunderbolt (PC-12)
- USS Shamal (PC-13)
- USS Tornado (PC-14) [I]

== Patrol craft (PC) ==
- USS PC-454, ex-SP-104, later PYc-46
- USS PC-455, later PYc-47
- USS PC-456, later PYc-48
- USS PC-457, sunk in collision 14 August 1941
- USS PC-458, later PYc-49
- USS PC-459, later PY-18
- USS PC-460, later PYc-50
- USS PC-509, later PYc-51
- USS PC-510, later YP-105
- USS PC-523, later YP-77

The following submarine chasers were 173/174 feet long and used the PC designation. The large missing sections of these numbers for the most part come from the sharing of the same number sequence with the 110-foot submarine chasers that used the SC designation and the 134-foot patrol craft sweepers that used the PCS designation. This number sequence would end in 1964, and then restart with '1' for the Cyclone-class coastal patrol craft.

- USS PC-451 (experimental ship)
- USS PC-452 (experimental ship), later IX-211

PC-461 class

- USS Bluffton (PC-461)
- USS PCC-462
- USS PCC-463
- USS PC-464
- USS Paragould (PC-465)
- USS Carmi (PC-466)
- USS PC-467 to Norway as HNoMS King Haakon VII
- USS PC-468
- USS PCC-469
- USS Antigo (PC-470)
- USS PC-471
- USS PC-472
- USS PC-473
- USS PC-474
- USS PC-475
- USS PC-476
- USS PC-477
- USS PC-478
- USS PC-479
- USS PC-480
- USS PC-481
- USS PC-482
- USS Rolla (PC-483)
- USS Cooperstown (PC-484)
- USS PC-485
- USS Jasper (PC-486)
- USS Larchmont (PC-487)
- USS PC-488, later IX-221
- USS PC-489
- USS PC-490
- USS PC-491
- USS PC-492
- USS PC-493
- USS PC-494
- USS PC-495
- USS PC-496, sunk by torpedo 4 June 1943, 5 killed

497-507, 511 to 522, and 524-539 were used by SC submarine chasers

- USS PC-540
- USS PC-541
- USS PC-542
- USS PC-543
- USS PC-544
- USS PC-545
- USS PC-546
- USS PC-547
- USS PC-548
- USS PC-549, later PCC-549
- USS PC-550
- USS PC-551
- USS PC-552
- USS Malone (PC-553)
- USS PC-554
- USS PC-555, later PCC-555
- USS PC-556
- USS PC-557
- USS PC-558, sunk by torpedo 9 May 1944, approx. 35 killed
- USS PC-559
- USS Oberlin (PC-560)
- USS PC-561
- USS PC-562
- USS PC-563, later PCC-563
- USS Chadron (PC-564)
- USS Gilmer (PC-565)
- USS Honesdale (PC-566)
- USS Riverhead (PC-567)
- USS Altus (PC-568)
- USS Petoskey (PC-569)
- USS PC-570
- USS Anoka (PC-571)
- USS Tooele (PC-572)
- USS PC-573
- USS PC-574
- USS PC-575
- USS PC-576
- USS PC-577
- USS PC-578, later PCC-578
- USS Wapakoneta (PC-579)
- USS Malvern (PC-580)
- USS Manville (PC-581)
- USS PC-582, later PCC-582
- USS PC-583
- USS PC-584
- USS PC-585
- USS Patchogue (PC-586)
- USS PC-587
- USS PC-588, later PCC-588
- USS PC-589, later PCC-589
- USS PC-590
- USS PC-591
- USS Towanda (PC-592)
- USS PC-593
- USS PC-594
- USS PC-595
- USS PC-596
- USS Kerrville (PC-597)
- USS PC-598, later PCC-598
- USS PC-599
- USS PC-600
- USS Arcata (PC-601)
- USS Alturas (PC-602)
- USS Solvay (PC-603)
- USS PC-604
- USS PC-605
- USS Andrews (PC-606)
- USS PC-607
- USS PC-608
- USS PC-609
- USS PC-610
- USS PC-611
- USS PC-612
- USS PC-613
- USS PC-614
- USS PC-615
- USS PC-616
- USS Beeville (PC-617)
- USS Weatherford (PC-618)
- USS Dalhart (PC-619)
- USS Bethany (PC-620)
- USS PC-621
- USS PC-622
- USS PC-623
- USS PC-624, later YW-120
- USS PC-625
- USS PC-626
- USS PC-627
- USS PC-684
- USS Pikeville (PC-776)
- USS Waynesburg (PC-777)
- USS Gallipolis (PC-778)
- USS Mechanicsburg (PC-779)
- USS Maynard (PC-780)
- USS Metuchen (PC-781)
- USS Glenolden (PC-782)
- USS PC-783
- USS PC-784
- USS Frostburg (PC-785)
- USS PC-786
- USS PC-787
- USS PC-788
- USS PC-789
- USS PC-790
- USS PC-791
- USS PC-792
- USS PC-793
- USS PC-794
- USS PC-795
- USS PC-796
- USS PC-797
- USS PC-798
- USS PC-799 to Republic of Korea as Kum Gang San (PC-702)
- USS PC-800
- USS PC-801
- USS PC-802, later PCC-802, to Republic of Korea as Sam Gak San (PC-703)
- USS PC-803, later PCC-803
- USS PC-804
- USS PC-805, later PGM-10
- USS PC-806, later PGM-11
- USS PC-807
- USS Ripley (PC-808)
- USS PC-809
- USS PC-810 to Republic of Korea as Jiri San (PC-704)
- USS PC-814
- USS PC-815, sunk in collision 11 September 1945, 1 killed
- USS PC-816
- USS Welch (PC-817)
- USS PC-818
- USS PC-819
- USS PC-820
- USS PC-821
- USS Asheboro (PC-822)
- USS PC-823 to Republic of Korea as Pak Tu San (PC-701)
- USS PC-824
- USS PC-825
- USS PC-826, later PYc-52
- USS PC-1039, later SC-1039
- USS Edenton (PC-1077)
- USS PC-1078
- USS Ludington (PC-1079)
- USS PC-1080
- USS Cadiz (PC-1081)
- USS PC-1082
- USS PC-1083
- USS PC-1084
- USS PC-1085
- USS PC-1086
- USS Placerville (PC-1087)
- USS PC-1088, later PGM-12
- USS PC-1089, later PGM-13
- USS PC-1090, later PGM-14
- USS PC-1091, later PGM-15
- USS Greencastle (PC-1119)
- USS Carlinville (PC-1120)
- USS PC-1121
- USS PC-1122
- USS PC-1123
- USS PC-1124
- USS Cordele (PC-1125)
- USS PC-1126, later PCC-1126
- USS PC-1127
- USS PC-1128
- USS PC-1129
- USS PC-1130
- USS PC-1131
- USS PC-1132
- USS PC-1133
- USS PC-1134
- USS Canastota (PC-1135)
- USS Galena (PC-1136), later PCC-1136
- USS Worthington (PC-1137), later PCC-1137
- USS Lapeer (PC-1138)
- USS Glenwood (PC-1140)
- USS Pierre (PC-1141)
- USS Hanford (PC-1142)
- USS PC-1143
- USS PC-1144
- USS Winnemucca (PC-1145)
- USS PC-1146
- USS PC-1147
- USS PC-1148, later PGM-16
- USS Susanville (PC-1149)
- USS PC-1167
- USS PC-1168
- USS PC-1169, later PCC-1169
- USS Kelso (PC-1170)
- USS PC-1171
- USS Olney (PC-1172)
- USS Andalusia (PC-1173)
- USS Fredonia (PC-1174)
- USS Vandalia (PC-1175)
- USS Minden (PC-1176)
- USS PC-1177, later PCC-1177
- USS PC-1178, later PCC-1178
- USS Morris (PC-1179)
- USS Woodstock (PC-1180)
- USS Wildwood (PC-1181)
- USS PC-1182
- USS PC-1183
- USS PC-1184
- USS PC-1185
- USS Ipswich (PC-1186)
- USS PC-1187
- USS PC-1188
- USS PC-1189, later PGM-17
- USS Bel Air (PC-1191)
- USS PC-1192
- USS Ridgway (PC-1193)
- USS PC-1194
- USS PC-1195
- USS Mayfield (PC-1196)
- USS PC-1197
- USS Westerly (PC-1198)
- USS PC-1199
- USS PC-1200
- USS Kittery (PC-1201)
- USS PC-1202
- USS PC-1203
- USS PC-1206
- USS PC-1207
- USS PC-1208
- USS Medina (PC-1209)
- USS PC-1210
- USS PC-1211
- USS Laurinburg (PC-1212)
- USS Louden (PC-1213)
- USS PC-1214
- USS PC-1215
- USS Elkins (PC-1216)
- USS PC-1217
- USS PC-1218
- USS PC-1219
- USS PC-1220
- USS PC-1221
- USS PC-1222
- USS PC-1223
- USS Waverly (PC-1225)
- USS PC-1226
- USS PC-1227
- USS Munising (PC-1228)
- USS Wauseon (PC-1229)
- USS Grinnell (PC-1230)
- USS Tipton (PC-1231)
- USS PC-1232
- USS PC-1233
- USS PC-1235
- USS PC-1236
- USS Abingdon (PC-1237)
- USS PC-1238
- USS Culpeper (PC-1240)
- USS PC-1241
- USS Port Clinton (PC-1242)
- USS PC-1243
- USS PC-1244, later PCC-1244
- USS PC-1245
- USS Canandaigua (PC-1246)
- USS PC-1247
- USS PC-1248 to France as Sabre (W11)
- USS PC-1249 to France as Pique (W13)
- USS PC-1250 to France as Cimeterre (W12)
- USS PC-1251, later PCC-1251
- USS Tarrytown (PC-1252)
- USS PC-1253
- USS PC-1254
- USS PC-1255, later PGM-18
- USS PC-1257
- USS PC-1258
- USS Durango (PC-1260)
- USS PC-1261, sunk by shore gunfire 6 June 1944
- USS PC-1262
- USS Milledgeville (PC-1263)
- USS PC-1264, one of 2 USN ships with a nearly all African-American crew in WW2
- USS PC-1265

1376 to 1465 used by PCS patrol minesweepers, a few did hold the PC designation at times

- USS PC-1427, later PCS-1427
- USS PC-1465, later PCS-1465, AMc-204 as Minah, AMCU-14, MHC-14
- USS Grosse Pointe (PC-1546), Operation Castle nuclear test participant
- USS Corinth (PC-1547)
- USS PC-1548, later PGM-9
- USS PC-1549
- USS PC-1550, later PGM-19
- USS PC-1551, later PGM-20
- USS PC-1552, later PGM-21
- USS PC-1553, later PGM-22
- USS PC-1554, later PGM-23
- USS PC-1555, later PGM-24
- USS PC-1556, later PGM-25
- USS PC-1557, later PGM-26
- USS PC-1558, later PGM-27
- USS PC-1559, later PGM-28
- USS PC-1560 to France as Coutelas (W22)
- USS PC-1561
- USS PC-1562 to France as Javelot (W23)
- USS PC-1563
- USS PC-1564
- PC-1565, later PGM-29
- PC-1566, later PGM-30
- PC-1567, later PGM-31
- PC-1568, later PGM-32
- USS Anacortes (PC-1569)
- PC-1570 to PC-1585 canceled

The Adroit class was a group of PC-461 class submarine chasers completed as minesweepers (AM-82 through AM-99). However, they were considered unsatisfactory in this role, and were all eventually converted back into submarine chasers.

- USS PC-1586, ex-AM-82
- USS PC-1587, ex-AM-83
- USS PC-1588, ex-AM-84
- USS PC-1589, ex-AM-85
- USS PC-1590, ex-AM-86
- USS PC-1591, ex-AM-87
- USS PC-1592, ex-AM-88
- USS PC-1593, ex-AM-89
- USS PC-1594, ex-AM-90
- USS PC-1595, ex-AM-91
- USS PC-1596, ex-AM-92
- USS PC-1597, ex-AM-93
- USS PC-1598, ex-AM-94
- USS PC-1599, ex-AM-95, later PCC-1599
- USS PC-1600, ex-AM-96
- USS PC-1601, ex-AM-97, later PCC-1601
- USS PC-1602, ex-AM-98, later PCC-1602
- USS PC-1603, ex-AM-99

- USS PC-1610 to France as Le Fougueux (P641)
- USS PC-1611 to France as L'Opiniatre (P642)
- USS PC-1612 to France as L'Agile (P643)
- USS PC-1613 to Portugal as Maio (P587)
- USS PC-1614 to Portugal as Porto Santo (P 588)
- USS PC-1615 to Yugoslavia as Udarnik (PBR 51)
- USS PC-1616 to Ethiopia as Zerai Deres, then to Italy as Vedetta F597
- USS PC-1617 to Portugal as Sao Nicolus (P 589)
- USS PC-1618 to France as P-7
- USS PC-1619 to Italy as Albatros (F 543)
- USS PC-1620 to Italy as Alcione (F 544)
- USS PC-1621 to Italy as Airone (F 545)
- USS PC-1622 to Denmark as Bellona (F 344)
- USS PC-1623 to Denmark as Diana (F 345)
- USS PC-1624 to Denmark as Flora (F 346)
- USS PC-1625 to Denmark as Triton (F 347)
- USS PC-1626 to Italy as Aquila (F 542)
- USS PC-1635 to Portugal as Brava (P 590)
- USS PC-1636 to Portugal as Fogo (P 591)
- USS PC-1637 to Portugal as Boavista (P 592)
- USS PC-1638 to Turkey as Sultanhisar (P 111)
- USS PC-1639 to Turkey as Demirhisar (P 112)
- USS PC-1640 to Turkey as Yarhisar (P 113)
- USS PC-1641 to Turkey as Akhisar (P 114)
- USS PC-1642 to Turkey as Sivrihisar (P 115)
- USS PC-1643 to Turkey as Kochisar (P 116)
- USS PC-1644 built in Denmark as Peder Skram (F 352)
- USS PC-1645 built in Denmark as Herluf Trolle (F 353)
- USS PC-1646 built in Chile as Papudo (P 37)
- USS PC-1647 canceled

=== Patrol craft, control (PCC) ===
Thirty-five submarine chasers (PC) were converted into amphibious landing control vessels during World War II and reclassified as Patrol Craft, Control after the war.

== Patrol craft escort, and patrol craft escort rescue (PCE, PCER) ==
The Patrol Craft Escort Rescue (PCER), which were intended to rescue crews from ships attacked in convoys, were originally intended to be designated as Convoy Rescue Craft (APR), but this was designation was abandoned.

=== PCE-827 to PCE-841 ===
- USS PCE-827 to UK as HMS Kilbernie (BEC 1)
- USS PCE-828 to UK as HMS Kilbride (BEC 2)
- USS PCE-829 to UK as HMS Kilchatten (BEC 3)
- USS PCE-830 to UK as HMS Kilchrenan (BEC 4)
- USS PCE-831 to UK as HMS Kildary (BEC 5)
- USS PCE-832 to UK as HMS Kildwick (BEC 6)
- USS PCE-833 to UK as HMS Kilham (BEC 7)
- USS PCE-834 to UK as HMS Kilkenzie (BEC 8)
- USS PCE-835 to UK as HMS Kilhampton (BEC 9)
- USS PCE-836 to UK as HMS Kilmacolm (BEC 10)
- USS PCE-837 to UK as HMS Kilmarnok (BEC 11)
- USS PCE-838 to UK as HMS Kilmartin (BEC 12)
- USS PCE-839 to UK as HMS Kilmelford (BEC 13)
- USS PCE-840 to UK as HMS Kilmington (BEC 14)
- USS PCE-841 to UK as HMS Kilmore (BEC 15)

=== PCE-842 to PCE-904 ===
PCE-842 class

- USS Marfa (PCE-842)
- USS Skowhegan (PCE-843)
- USS PCE-844
- USS Worland (PCE-845)
- USS Eunice (PCE-846)
- USS PCE-847
- USS PCER-848
- USS Somersworth (PCE(R)-849)
- USS Fairview (PCE(R)-850)
- USS Rockville (EPCE-851)
- USS Brattleboro (EPCE(R)-852)
- USS Amherst (PCE(R)-853)
- USS PCER-854
- USS Rexburg (EPCE(R)-855)
- USS Whitehall (PCE-856)
- USS Marysville (EPCE(R)-857)
- USS PCE-858
- USS PCE(R)-859
- USS PCE-860
- PCE-861 to PCE-866 canceled
- USS PCE-867
- USS PCE-868
- USS PCE-869
- USS Dania (PCE-870)
- USS PCE-871
- USS PCE-872
- USS PCE(C)-873
- USS Pascagoula (PCE-874)
- USS PCE-875
- USS PCE-876, later YDG-8
- USS PCE(C)-877, later PCE-877
- USS PCE-878, later ACM-4
- USS PCE-879, later YDG-9
- USS Ely (PCE-880)
- USS PCE-881
- USS PCE-882
- USS PCE-883, later YDG-10
- USS PCE-884
- USS PCE-885
- USS Banning (PCEC-886)
- PCE-887 to PCE-890 canceled
- USS PCE-891
- USS Somerset (PCE-892)
- USS PCE-893
- USS Farmington (PCE-894)
- USS Crestview (PCE-895)
- USS PCE(C)-896
- USS PCE-897
- USS PCE-898
- USS Lamar (PCE-899)
- USS Groton (PCE-900)
- USS PCE-901, later AG-72
- USS Portage (PCE-902)
- USS Batesburg (PCE-903)
- USS Gettysburg (PCE-904)

=== PCE-905 to PCE-960 ===
- USS PCE-905, later AM-232
- USS PCE-906, later AM-233
- USS PCE-907, later AM-363
- USS PCE-908, later AM-235
- USS PCE-909, later AM-236
- PCE-910 cancelled June 6, 1944
- USS PCE-911, later AM-351
- USS PCE-912, later AM-352
- USS PCE-913, later AM-353
- USS PCE-914, later AM-354
- USS PCE-915, later AM-355
- USS PCE-916, later AM-356
- USS PCE-917, later AM-357
- USS PCE-918, later AM-358
- USS PCE-919, later AM-359
- PCE-920 to PCE-934 canceled November 1, 1945
- PCE(R)-935 to PCE(R)-946 canceled
- PCE-947 to PCE-960 canceled

=== PCE-1604 to PCE-1609 ===
- USS PCE-1604 to Netherlands as Fret (F 818)
- USS PCE-1605 to Netherlands as Hermelijn (F 819)
- USS PCE-1606 to Netherlands as Vos (F 820)
- USS PCE-1607 to Netherlands as Wolf (F 817)
- USS PCE-1608 to Netherlands as Panter (F 821)
- USS PCE-1609 to Netherlands as Jaguar (F 822)

== Patrol craft fast (PCF) ==
The Patrol Craft Fast, also known as the Swift Boats, were acquired for the Vietnam War; 193 of these 50 foot boats were purchased.

== Patrol craft sweeper (PCS) ==
At least 90 134-foot YMS-1-class minesweeper hulls were completed as patrol craft. These were judged to not be successful, and many were converted to sonar school ships or back to minesweepers.

- USS Winder (PCS-1376)
- USS PCS-1377, sonar school ship
- USS Provincetown (PCS-1378), sonar school ship
- USS PCS-1379, later PCSC-1379
- USS Rushville (PCS-1380)
- USS PCS-1381
- USS PCS-1382
- USS Attica (PCS-1383), sonar school ship
- USS Eufaula (PCS-1384), sonar school ship
- USS Hallidaysburg (PCS-1385), sonar school ship
- USS Hampton (PCS-1386), sonar school ship
- USS Beaufort (PCS-1387), sonar school ship
- USS PCS-1388, later AGS-7
- USS PCS-1389, later PCSC-1389
- USS PCS-1390, later PCSC-1390
- USS PCS-1391, later PCSC-1391
- USS Deming (PCS-1392), sonar school ship
- USS PCS-1393, later YMS-446
- USS PCS-1394, later YMS-447
- USS PCS-1395, later YMS-448
- USS PCS-1396, later AGS-8
- USS PCS-1397, sonar school ship
- USS PCS-1398, later YMS-449
- USS PCS-1399, sonar school ship, later YMS-450
- USS Coquille (PCS-1400), ex-AMS-59, sonar school ship
- USS McMinnville (PCS-1401), ex-YMS-452, sonar school ship
- USS PCS-1402, later PCSC-1402
- USS PCS-1403, later PCSC-1403
- USS PCS-1404, later AGS-9
- USS PCS-1405
- USS PCS-1406, later YMS-453
- USS PCS-1407, later YMS-454
- USS PCS-1408, later YMS-455
- USS PCS-1409, later YMS-456
- USS PCS-1410, later YMS-457
- USS PCS-1411, later YMS-458
- USS PCS-1412, later YMS-459
- USS Elsmere (PCS-1413)
- USS PCS-1414
- USS PCS-1415, later YMS-460
- USS PCS-1416, later YMS-461
- USS PCS-1417, sonar school ship
- USS PCS-1418, later PCSC-1418
- USS PCS-1419
- USS PCS-1420, sonar school ship
- USS PCS-1421, later PCSC-1421
- USS PCS-1422
- USS Prescott (PCS-1423), sonar school ship
- USS PCS-1424, sonar school ship
- USS PCS-1425
- USS PCS-1426, sonar school ship
- USS PCS-1427, ex-PC-1427, later YMS-462
- USS PCS-1428, later YMS-463
- USS PCS-1429, later PCSC-1429
- USS PCS-1430
- USS Grafton (EPCS-1431)
- USS PCS-1432, later YMS-464
- USS PCS-1433, later YMS-465
- USS PCS-1434, later YMS-466
- USS PCS-1435, later YMS-467
- USS PCS-1436, later YMS-468
- USS PCS-1437, later YMS-469
- USS PCS-1438, later YMS-470
- USS PCS-1439, later YMS-471
- USS PCS-1440, later YMS-472
- USS PCS-1441, sonar school ship
- USS PCS-1442, sonar school ship
- USS PCS-1443, later YMS-473
- USS Conneaut (PCS-1444), ex-YMS-474, sonar school ship
- USS PCS-1445, sonar school ship
- USS PCS-1446, sonar school ship
- USS PCS-1447, later YMS-475
- USS PCS-1448, sonar school ship, later YMS-476
- USS PCS-1449, sonar school ship
- USS PCS-1450
- USS PCS-1451
- USS PCS-1452, later PCSC-1452
- USS PCS-1453, later YMS-477
- USS PCS-1454, later YMS-478
- USS PCS-1455, later PCSC-1455
- USS PCS-1456, later YMS-479
- USS PCS-1457, later AGS-10
- USS PCS-1458, later AGS-6
- USS PCS-1459
- USS PCS-1460, later PCSC-1460
- USS PCS-1461, later PCSC-1461
- USS PCS-1462, later YMS-480
- USS PCS-1463, later YMS-481
- USS PCS-1464, later AMc-203
- USS PCS-1465, ex-PC-1465, later AMc-204

=== Patrol craft sweeper, control (PCSC) ===
Thirteen patrol craft sweepers (PCS) were converted into amphibious landing control vessels during World War II and reclassified as Patrol Craft Sweeper, Control.

== Patrol escort (PE) ==
Of 112 Eagle-class patrol craft planned 60 of these World War I era ships were completed, being given numbers from 1 to 60. Only three were commissioned prior to the Armistice which ended World War I and only eight saw service in World War II of which PE-56 was sunk by a U-boat.

Designation	Keel Laid	Launched	Commissioned	Disposition
PE-1	7 May 1918	11 July 1918	27 October 1918	Sold 11 June 1930
PE-2	10 May 1918	19 August 1918	11 July 1918	Sold 11 June 1930
PE-3	16 May 1918	11 September 1918	11 November 1918	Sold 11 June 1930
PE-4	21 May 1918	15 September 1918	14 November 1918	Sold 11 June 1930
PE-5	28 May 1918	28 September 1918	19 November 1918	Sold 11 June 1930
PE-6	3 June 1918	16 October 1918	21 November 1918	Destroyed as target 30 November 1934
PE-7	8 June 1918	5 October 1918	24 November 1918	Destroyed as target 30 November 1934
PE-8	10 June 1918	11 November 1918	31 October 1919	Sold 1 April 1931
PE-9	17 June 1918	8 November 1918	27 October 1919	Sold 26 May 1930
PE-10	6 July 1918	9 November 1918	31 October 1919	Destroyed 19 August 1937
PE-11	13 July 1918	14 November 1918	29 May 1919	Sold 16 January 1935
PE-12	13 July 1918	12 November 1918	6 November 1919	Sold 30 December 1935
PE-13	15 July 1918	9 January 1919	2 April 1919	Sold 26 May 1930
PE-14	20 July 1918	23 January 1919	17 June 1919	Destroyed as target 22 November 1934
PE-15	21 July 1918	25 January 1919	11 June 1919	Sold 14 June 1934
PE-16	22 July 1918	11 January 1919	5 June 1919	Transferred to the Coast Guard late 1919
PE-17	3 August 1918	1 February 1919	3 July 1919	Wrecked off Long Island, New York 22 May 1922
PE-18	5 August 1918	10 February 1919	7 August 1919	Sold 11 June 1930
PE-19	6 August 1918	30 January 1919	25 June 1919	Destroyed 6 August 1946
PE-20	26 August 1918	15 February 1919	28 July 1919	Transferred to USCG late 1919
PE-21	31 August 1918	15 February 1919	31 July 1919	Transferred to USCG late 1919
PE-22	5 September 1918	10 February 1919	17 July 1919	Transferred to USCG late 1919
PE-23	11 September 1918	20 February 1919	19 June 1919	Sold 11 June 1930
PE-24	13 September 1918	24 February 1919	12 July 1919	Sold 11 June 1930
PE-25	17 September 1918	19 February 1919	30 June 1919	Lost 11 June 1930
PE-26	25 September 1918	1 March 1919	1 October 1919	Sold 29 August 1938
PE-27	22 October 1918	1 March 1919	14 July 1919	Sold 4 June 1946
PE-28	23 October 1918	1 March 1919	28 July 1919	Sold 11 June 1930
PE-29	18 November 1918	8 March 1919	20 August 1919	Sold 11 June 1930
PE-30	19 November 1918	8 March 1919	14 August 1919	Transferred to USCG late 1919
PE-31	19 November 1918	8 March 1919	14 August 1919	Sold 18 May 1923
PE-32	30 November 1918	15 March 1919	4 September 1919	Sold 3 March 1947
PE-33	14 February 1918	15 March 1919	4 September 1919	Sold 11 June 1930
PE-34	8 January 1919	15 March 1919	3 September 1919	Sold 9 June 1932
PE-35	13 January 1919	22 March 1919	22 August 1919	Sold 7 June 1938
PE-36	22 January 1919	22 March 1919	20 August 1919	Sold 27 February 1936
PE-37	27 January 1919	25 March 1919	30 September 1919	Sold 11 June 1930
PE-38	31 January 1919	29 March 1919	30 July 1919	Sold 3 March 1947
PE-39	3 February 1919	29 March 1919	20 September 1919	Sold 7 June 1938
PE-40	7 February 1919	5 April 1919	1 October 1919	Destroyed as target 19 November 1934
PE-41	20 February 1919	5 April 1919	26 September 1919	Sold 11 June 1930
PE-42	13 February 1919	17 May 1919	3 October 1919	Sold 11 June 1930
PE-43	17 February 1919	17 May 1919	2 October 1919	Sold 26 May 1930
PE-44	20 February 1919	24 May 1919	30 September 1919	Disposed of 14 May 1938
PE-45	20 February 1919	17 May 1919	2 October 1919	Sold 11 June 1930
PE-46	24 February 1919	24 May 1919	3 October 1919	Sold 10 December 1936
PE-47	3 March 1919	19 June 1919	4 October 1919	Sold 30 December 1935
PE-48	3 March 1919	24 May 1919	8 October 1919	Sold 10 October 1946
PE-49	4 March 1919	14 June 1919	10 October 1919	Sold 20 September 1930
PE-50	10 March 1919	18 July 1919	6 October 1919	Sold 11 June 1930
PE-51	10 March 1919	14 June 1919	2 October 1919	Sold 29 August 1938
PE-52	10 March 1919	9 July 1919	10 October 1919	Sold 29 August 1938
PE-53	17 March 1919	13 August 1919	20 October 1919	Sold 26 August 1938
PE-54	17 March 1919	17 July 1919	10 October 1919	Sold 26 May 1930
PE-55	17 March 1919	22 July 1919	10 October 1919	Sold 3 March 1947
PE-56	25 March 1919	15 August 1919	26 October 1919	Exploded off Portland, Maine, on 23 April 1945 after being torpedoed by U-853, 49 killed
PE-57	25 March 1919	29 July 1919	15 October 1919	Sold March 5, 1947
PE-58	25 March 1919	2 August 1919	20 October 1919	Disposed of 30 June 1940
PE-59	31 March 1919	12 April 1919	19 September 1919	Sold 29 August 1938
PE-60	31 March 1919	13 August 1919	27 October 1919	Sold 29 August 1938

PE-61 through PE-112 were cancelled on November 30, 1918. PE-5, PE-15, PE-25, PE-45, PE-65, PE-75, PE-86, PE-95, PE-105, and PE-112 were allotted for transfer to Italy, though this plan was cancelled and none were ever delivered.

== Patrol frigate (PF) ==
Destroyer escorts were designed and built to naval construction standards, and as such could only be built at yards experienced with naval standards. The United States Maritime Commission created its S2-S2-AQ1 design - which was based on the British-designed River class - for much the same role but using civilian construction standards. These ships would be classed by the Navy as the Tacoma class frigates. Twenty-one would be renamed as Colony-class frigates after transfers to the Royal Navy. Others would be transferred in 1945 to the Soviet Union (USSR) under Project Hula.

Asheville class, River class in the Royal Navy

- USS Asheville (PF-1) ex-PG-101
- USS Natchez (PF-2) ex-PG-102

Tacoma class

- USS Tacoma (PF-3) ex-PG-111, to USSR 16 August 1945
- USS Sausalito (PF-4) ex-PG-112, to USSR 16 August 1945
- USS Hoquiam (PF-5) ex-PG-113, to USSR 16 August 1945
- USS Pasco (PF-6) ex-PG-114, to USSR 16 August 1945
- USS Albuquerque (PF-7) ex-PG-115, to USSR 16 August 1945
- USS Everett (PF-8) ex-PG-116, to USSR 16 August 1945
- USS Pocatello (PF-9) ex-PG-117
- USS Brownsville (PF-10) ex-PG-118
- USS Grand Forks (PF-11) ex-PG-119
- USS Casper (PF-12) ex-PG-120
- USS Pueblo (PF-13) ex-PG-121
- USS Grand Island (PF-14) ex-PG-122
- USS Annapolis (PF-15) ex-PG-123
- USS Bangor (PF-16) ex-PG-124
- USS Key West (PF-17) ex-PG-125
- USS Alexandria (PF-18) ex-PG-126
- USS Huron (PF-19) ex-PG-127
- USS Gulfport (PF-20) ex-PG-128
- USS Bayonne (PF-21) ex-PG-129, to USSR 2 September 1945
- USS Gloucester (PF-22) ex-PG-130, to USSR 4 September 1945
- USS Shreveport (PF-23) ex-PG-131
- USS Muskegon (PF-24) ex-PG-132
- USS Charlottesville (PF-25) ex-PG-133, to USSR 12 July 1945
- USS Poughkeepsie (PF-26) ex-PG-134, to USSR 2 September 1945
- USS Newport (PF-27) ex-PG-135, to USSR 4 September 1945
- USS Emporia (PF-28) ex-PG-136
- USS Groton (PF-29) ex-PG-137
- USS Hingham (PF-30) ex-PG-138
- USS Grand Rapids (PF-31) ex-PG-139
- USS Woonsocket (PF-32) ex-PG-140
- USS Dearborn (PF-33) ex-Toledo, ex-PG-141
- USS Long Beach (PF-34) ex-PG-142, to USSR 12 July 1945
- USS Belfast (PF-35) ex-PG-143, to USSR 12 July 1945
- USS Glendale (PF-36) ex-PG-144, to USSR 12 July 1945
- USS San Pedro (PF-37) ex-PG-145, to USSR 12 July 1945
- USS Coronado (PF-38) ex-PG-146, to USSR 12 July 1945
- USS Ogden (PF-39) ex-PG-147, to USSR 12 July 1945
- USS Eugene (PF-40) ex-PG-148
- USS El Paso (PF-41) ex-PG-149
- USS Van Buren (PF-42) ex-PG-150
- USS Orange (PF-43) ex-PG-151
- USS Corpus Christi (PF-44) ex-PG-152
- USS Hutchinson (PF-45) ex-PG-153
- USS Bisbee (PF-46) ex-PG-154, to USSR 26 August 1945
- USS Gallup (PF-47) ex-PG-155, to USSR 26 August 1945
- USS Rockford (PF-48) ex-PG-156, to USSR 26 August 1945
- USS Muskogee (PF-49) ex-PG-157, to USSR 26 August 1945
- USS Carson City (PF-50) ex-PG-158, to USSR 26 August 1945
- USS Burlington (PF-51) ex-PG-159, to USSR 26 August 1945
- USS Allentown (PF-52) ex-PG-160, to USSR 12 July 1945
- USS Machias (PF-53) ex-PG-161, to USSR 12 July 1945
- USS Sandusky (PF-54) ex-PG-162, to USSR 12 July 1945
- USS Bath (PF-55) ex-PG-163, to USSR 4 September 1945
- USS Covington (PF-56) ex-PG-164
- USS Sheboygan (PF-57) ex-PG-165
- USS Abilene (PF-58) ex-Bridgeport, ex-PG-166
- USS Beaufort (PF-59) ex-PG-167
- USS Charlotte (PF-60) ex-PG-168
- USS Manitowoc (PF-61) ex-PG-169
- USS Gladwyne (PF-62) ex-Worcester, ex-PG-170
- USS Moberly (PF-63) ex-Scranton, ex-PG-171
- USS Knoxville (PF-64) ex-PG-172
- USS Uniontown (PF-65) ex-PG-173
- USS Reading (PF-66) ex-PG-174
- USS Peoria (PF-67) ex-PG-175
- USS Brunswick (PF-68) ex-PG-176
- USS Davenport (PF-69) ex-PG-177
- USS Evansville (PF-70) ex-PG-178, to USSR 4 September 1945
- USS New Bedford (PF-71) ex-PG-179
- USS Hallowell (PF-72) ex-Machias, ex-PG-180, to UK as HMS Anguilla (K500)
- USS Hamond (PF-73) ex-PG-181, to UK as HMS Antigua (K501)
- USS Hargood (PF-74) ex-PG-182, to UK as HMS Ascension (K502)
- USS Hotham (PF-75) ex-PG-183, to UK as HMS Bahamas (K503)
- USS Halstead (PF-76) ex-PG-184, to UK as HMS Barbados (K504)
- USS Hannam (PF-77) ex-PG-185, to UK as HMS Caicos (K505)
- USS Harland (PF-78) ex-PG-186, to UK as HMS Cayman (K506)
- USS Harman (PF-79) ex-PG-187, to UK as HMS Dominica (K507)
- USS Harvey (PF-80) ex-PG-188, to UK as HMS Gold Coast (K584)
- USS Holmes (PF-81) ex-PG-189, to UK as HMS Hong Kong (K585)
- USS Hornby (PF-82) ex-PG-190, to UK as HMS Montserrat (K586)
- USS Hoste (PF-83) ex-PG-191, to UK as HMS Nyasaland (K587)
- USS Howett (PF-84) ex-PG-192, to UK as HMS Papua (K588)
- USS Pilford (PF-85) ex-PG-193, to UK as HMS Pitcairn (K589)
- USS St. Helena (PF-86) ex-Pasley, to UK as HMS St. Helena (K590)
- USS Patton (PF-87) ex-PG-195, to UK as HMS Sarawak (K591)
- USS Pearl (PF-88) ex-PG-196, to UK as HMS Seychelles (K592)
- USS Phillimore (PF-89) ex-PG-197, to UK as HMS Sierra Leone (K593)
- USS Popham (PF-90) ex-PG-198, to UK as HMS Somaliland (K594)
- USS Tortola (PF-91) ex-Peyton, to UK as HMS Tortola (K595)
- USS Zanzibar (PF-92) ex-Prowse, to UK as HMS Zanzibar (K596)
- USS Lorain (PF-93) ex-Roanoke (PG-201)
- USS Milledgeville (PF-94) ex-Sitka, ex-PG-202
- USS Stamford (PF-95) ex-PG-203, Construction cancelled December 31, 1943
- USS Macon (PF-96) ex-PG-204 Construction cancelled December 31, 1943
- USS Lorain (PF-97) ex-Vallejo (PG-205) Contract cancelled January 11, 1944
- USS Milledgeville (PF-98) ex-PG-206 Construction cancelled December 31, 1943
- USS Orlando (PF-99) ex-PG-207
- USS Racine (PF-100) ex-PG-208
- USS Greensboro (PF-101) ex-PG-209
- USS Forsyth (PF-102) ex-PG-210

Bayandor class

- USS PF-103 to Iran as Bayandor (F 25)
- USS PF-104 to Iran as Naghdi (F 25)(F 26)
- USS PF-105 to Iran as Milanian (F 27)
- USS PF-106 to Iran as Kahnamuie (F 28)

Tapi class

- USS PF-107 to Thailand as Tapi (PF 5)
- USS PF-108 to Thailand as Khirirat (PF 6)

== Patrol gunboat (PG) ==
Yorktown class

- USS Yorktown (PG-1)

Petrel class

- USS Petrel (PG-2)

Yorktown class

- USS Concord (PG-3)
- USS Bennington (PG-4)

Machias class

- USS Machias (PG-5)
- USS Castine (PG-6)

Nashville class

- USS Nashville (PG-7)

Wilmington class

- USS Wilmington (PG-8), later IX-30
- USS Helena (PG-9)

Annapolis class

- USS Annapolis (PG-10), later IX-1
- USS Vicksburg (PG-11)
- USS Newport (PG-12), later IX-19
- USS Princeton (PG-13)

Wheeling class

- USS Wheeling (PG-14), later IX-28
- USS Marietta (PG-15)

Palos class

- USS Palos (PG-16), later PR-1

Dubuque class

- USS Dubuque (PG-17), ex-AG-6, IX-9
- USS Paducah (PG-18), ex-AG-7, IX-23

Sacramento class

- USS Sacramento (PG-19)

Palos class

- USS Monocacy (PG-20), later PR-2

Asheville class

- USS Asheville (PG-21)
- USS Tulsa (PG-22), later Tacloban

Alert class

- USS Nantucket (PG-23), ex-Rockport, later IX-18

Dolphin class

- USS Dolphin (PG-24)

Cincinnati class

- PG-25 reserved for USS Cincinnati (C-7)
- PG-26 reserved for USS Raleigh (C-8)

Montgomery class

- USS Marblehead (PG-27) ex-C-11

Denver class

- USS Denver (PG-28), ex-C-14, later CL-16
- USS Des Moines (PG-29), ex-C-15, later CL-17
- USS Chattanooga (PG-30), ex-C-16, later CL-18
- USS Galveston (PG-31), ex-C-17, later CL-19
- USS Tacoma (PG-32), ex-C-18, later CL-20
- USS Cleveland (PG-33), ex-C-19, later CL-21

New Orleans class

- USS New Orleans (PG-34), later CL-22

Topeka class

- USS Topeka (PG-35), later IX-35

New Orleans class

- USS Albany (PG-36), later CL-23

Ex-Spanish gunboats

- USS Callao (PG-37)
- USS Elcano (PG-38)
- USS Pampanga (PG-39)
- USS Quiros (PG-40)
- USS Samar (PG-41)
- USS Villalobos (PG-42)

Guam class

- USS Guam (PG-43), later PR-3
- USS Tutuila (PG-44), later PR-4

Panay class

- USS Panay (PG-45), later PR-5
- USS Oahu (PG-46), later PR-6

Luzon class

- USS Luzon (PG-47), later PR-7
- USS Mindanao (PG-48), later PR-8

Fulton class

- USS Fulton (PG-49), ex-AS-1

Erie class

- USS Erie (PG-50)
- USS Charleston (PG-51)

Converted yachts

- USS Niagara (PG-52), ex-CMc-2, later AGP-1
- USS Vixen (PG-53)
- USS St. Augustine (PG-54)
- USS Jamestown (PG-55), later AGP-3
- USS Williamsburg (PG-56), later AGC-369
- USS Plymouth (PG-57), sunk by torpedo 5 August 1943
- USS Hilo (PG-58), later AGP-2
- USS San Bernardino (PG-59)
- USS Beaumont (PG-60)
- USS Dauntless (PG-61)

Temptress class

- USS Temptress (PG-62) ex-HMS Veronica (K37)
- USS Surprise (PG-63) ex-HMS Heliotrope (K03)
- USS Spry (PG-64) ex-HMS Hibiscus (K24)
- USS Saucy (PG-65) ex-HMS Arabis (K73), renamed HMS Snapdragon on return
- USS Restless (PG-66) ex-HMS Periwinkle (K55)
- USS Ready (PG-67) ex-HMS Calendula (K28)
- USS Impulse (PG-68) ex-HMS Begonia (K66)
- USS Fury (PG-69) ex-HMS Larkspur (K82)
- USS Courage (PG-70) ex-HMS Heartsease (K15)
- USS Tenacity (PG-71) ex-HMS Candytuft (K09)

Converted yachts

- USS Nourmahal (PG-72)
- PG-73 to 84 unused
- USS Natchez (PG-85) ex-SP-159, later AGS-3

Action class

- USS Action (PG-86) ex-HMS Comfrey (K277)
- USS Alacrity (PG-87) ex-HMS Cornel (K278)
- USS Beacon (PG-88) ex-HMS Dittany (K279)
- USS Brisk (PG-89) ex-HMS Flax (K284)
- USS Caprice (PG-90) to UK as HMS Honesty (K285)
- USS Clash (PG-91) to UK as HMS Linaria (K282)
- USS Haste (PG-92) ex HMS Mandrake (K287)
- USS Intensity (PG-93) formerly HMS Milfoil (K288)
- USS Might (PG-94) ex-HMS Musk (K289)
- USS Pert (PG-95) ex-HMS Nepeta (K290)
- USS Prudent (PG-96) ex-HMS Privet (K291)
- USS Splendor (PG-97) to UK as HMS Rosebay (K286)
- USS Tact (PG-98) to UK as HMS Smilax (K280)
- USS Vim (PG-99) to UK as HMS Statice (K281)
- USS Vitality (PG-100) to UK as HMS Willowherb (K283)

Asheville class

- USS Asheville (PG-101), later PF-1
- USS Natchez (PG-102), later PF-2
- PG-103 to UK as HMS Barle (K298)
- PG-104 to UK as HMS Cuckmeree (K299)
- USS Danville (PG-105) to UK as HMS Evenrode (K300)
- PG-106 to UK as HMS Findhorn (K301)
- PG-107 to UK as HMS Inver (K302)
- PG-108 to UK as HMS Lossie (K303)
- PG-109 to UK as HMS Parret (K304)
- USS Shiel (PG-110) to UK as HMS Shiel (K305)

Tacoma class

- USS Tacoma (PG-111), later PF-3
- USS Sausalito (PG-112), later PF-4
- USS Hoquiam (PG-113), later PF-5
- USS Pasco (PG-114), later PF-6
- USS Albuquerque (PG-115), later PF-7
- USS Everett (PG-116), later PF-8
- USS Pocatello (PG-117), later PF-9
- USS Brownsville (PG-118), later PF-10
- USS Grand Forks (PG-119), later PF-11
- USS Casper (PG-120), later PF-12
- USS Pueblo (PG-121), later PF-13
- USS Grand Island (PG-122), later PF-14
- USS Annapolis (PG-123), later PF-15
- USS Bangor (PG-124), later PF-16
- USS Key West (PG-125), later PF-17
- USS Alexandria (PG-126), later PF-18
- USS Huron (PG-127), later PF-19
- USS Gulfport (PG-128), later PF-20
- USS Bayonne (PG-129), later PF-21
- USS Gloucester (PG-130), later PF-22
- USS Shreveport (PG-131), later PF-23
- USS Muskegon (PG-132), later PF-24
- USS Charlottesville (PG-133), later PF-25
- USS Poughkeepsie (PG-134), later PF-26
- USS Newport (PG-135), later PF-27
- USS Emporia (PG-136), later PF-28
- USS Groton (PG-137), later PF-29
- USS Hingham (PG-138), later PF-30
- USS Grand Rapids (PG-139), later PF-31
- USS Woonsocket (PG-140), later PF-32
- USS Dearborn (PG-141), later PF-33
- USS Long Beach (PG-142), later PF-34
- USS Belfast (PG-143), later PF-35
- USS Glendale (PG-144), later PF-36
- USS San Pedro (PG-145), later PF-37
- USS Coronado (PG-146), later PF-38
- USS Ogden (PG-147), later PF-39
- USS Eugene (PG-148), later PF-40
- USS El Paso (PG-149), later PF-41
- USS Van Buren (PG-150), later PF-42
- USS Orange (PG-151), later PF-43
- PG-152, later USS Corpus Christi (PF-44)
- USS Hutchinson (PG-153), later PF-45
- USS Bisbee (PG-154), later PF-46
- USS Gallup (PG-155), later PF-47
- USS Rockford (PG-156), later PF-48
- USS Muskogee (PG-157), later PF-49
- USS Carson City (PG-158), later PF-50
- USS Burlington (PG-159), later PF-51
- USS Allentown (PG-160), later PF-52
- USS Machias (PG-161), later PF-53
- USS Sandusky (PG-162), later PF-54
- USS Bath (PG-163), later PF-55
- USS Covington (PG-164), later PF-56
- USS Sheboygan (PG-165), later PF-57
- USS Abilene (PG-166), later PF-58
- USS Beaufort (PG-167), later PF-59
- USS Charlotte (PG-168), later PF-60
- USS Manitowoc (PG-169), later PF-61
- USS Gladwyne (PG-170), later PF-62
- USS Moberly (PG-171), later PF-63
- USS Knoxville (PG-172), later PF-64
- USS Chattanooga (PG-173), later PF-65
- USS Reading (PG-174), later PF-66
- USS Peoria (PG-175), later PF-67
- USS Brunswick (PG-176), later PF-68
- USS Davenport (PG-177), later PF-69
- USS Evansville (PG-178), later PF-70
- USS New Bedford (PG-179), later PF-71
- PG-180, later PF-72; to UK as HMS Anguilla (K500)
- PG-181, later PF-73; to UK as HMS Antigua (K501)
- PG-182, later PF-74; to UK as HMS Ascension (K502)
- PG-183, later PF-75; to UK as HMS Bahamas (K503)
- PG-184, later PF-76; to UK as HMS Barbados (K504)
- PG-185, later PF-77; to UK as HMS Caicos (K505)
- PG-186, later PF-78; to UK as HMS Cayman (K506)
- PG-187, later PF-79; to UK as HMS Dominica (K507)
- PG-188, later PF-80; to UK as HMS Gold Coast (K584) (later HMS Labuan)
- PG-189, later PF-81; to UK as HMS Hong Kong (K585) (later HMS Tobago)
- PG-190, later PF-82; to UK as HMS Montserrat (K586)
- PG-191, later PF-83; to UK as HMS Nyasaland (K587)
- PG-192, later PF-84; to UK as HMS Papua (K588)
- PG-193, later PF-85; to UK as HMS Pitcairn (K589)
- PG-194, later PF-86; to UK as HMS St. Helena (K590)
- PG-195, later PF-87; to UK as HMS Sarawak (K591)
- PG-196, later PF-88; to UK as HMS Seychelles (K592)
- PG-197, later PF-89; to UK as HMS Sierra Leone (K593) (later HMS Perim)
- PG-198, later PF-90; to UK as HMS Somaliland (K594)
- PG-199, later PF-91; to UK as HMS Tortola (K595)
- PG-200, later PF-92; to UK as HMS Zanzibar (K596)
- USS Roanoke (PG-201), later PF-93
- USS Milledgeville (PG-202), later PF-94
- PG-203, later PF-95; cancelled 31 December 1943
- PG-204, later PF-96; cancelled 31 December 1943
- USS Vallejo (PG-205), later PF-97; cancelled 11 January 1944
- PG-206, later PF-98; cancelled 31 December 1943
- USS Orlando (PG-207), later PF-99
- USS Racine (PG-208), later PF-100
- USS Greensboro (PG-209), later PF-101
- USS Forsyth (PG-210), later PF-102

== Patrol motor gunboat (PGM) ==
PGM-1 class

- USS PGM-1 ex-SC-644
- USS PGM-2 ex-SC-757
- USS PGM-3 ex-SC-1035
- USS PGM-4 ex-SC-1053
- USS PGM-5 ex-SC-1056
- USS PGM-6 ex-SC-1071
- USS PGM-7 ex-SC-1072
- USS PGM-8 ex-SC-1366

PGM-9 class

- USS PGM-9 ex-PC-1548, wrecked by Typhoon Louise Okinawa October 1945, no fatalities
- USS PGM-10 ex-PC-805
- USS PGM-11 ex-PC-806
- USS PGM-12 ex-PC-1088
- USS PGM-13 ex-PC-1089
- USS PGM-14 ex-PC-1090
- USS PGM-15 ex-PC-1091
- USS PGM-16 ex-PC-1148
- USS PGM-17 ex-PC-1189
- USS PGM-18 ex-PC-1255, sunk by mine 7 April 1945, 13 killed or missing
- USS PGM-19 ex-PC-1550
- USS PGM-20 ex-PC-1551
- USS PGM-21 ex-PC-1552
- USS PGM-22 ex-PC-1553
- USS PGM-23 ex-PC-1554, Operation Crossroads nuclear test participant
- USS PGM-24 ex-PC-1555, Operation Crossroads participant
- USS PGM-25 ex-PC-1556, Operation Crossroads participant
- USS PGM-26 ex-PC-1557
- USS PGM-27 ex-PC-1558
- USS PGM-28 ex-PC-1559
- USS PGM-29 ex-PC-1565, Operation Crossroads participant
- USS PGM-30 ex-PC-1566
- USS PGM-31 ex-PC-1567, Operation Crossroads participant
- USS PGM-32 ex-PC-1568, Operation Crossroads participant

PGM-33 class

- USS PGM-33 to the Philippines as Camarines (PG 48)
- USS PGM-34 to the Philippines as Sulu (PG 49)
- USS PGM-35 to the Philippines as La Union (PG 50)
- USS PGM-36 to the Philippines as Antique (PG 51)
- USS PGM-37 to the Philippines as Masbate (PG 52)
- USS PGM-38 to the Philippines as Mismamis Occidental (PG 53)

PGM-39 class

- USS PGM-39 to the Philippines as Agusan (G 61)
- USS PGM-40 to the Philippines as Catanduanes (G 62)
- USS PGM-41 to the Philippines as Romblon (G 63)
- USS PGM-42 to the Philippines as Palawan (G 64)
- USS PGM-43 to Burma as PGM-401
- USS PGM-44 to Burma as PGM-402
- USS PGM-45 to Burma as PGM-403
- USS PGM-46 to Burma as PGM-404

Daphne class

- USS PGM-47 to Denmark as Daphne (P 530)
- USS PGM-48 to Denmark as Havmanden (P 532)
- USS PGM-49 to Denmark as Najaden (P 534)
- USS PGM-50 to Denmark as Neptun (P 536)

PGM-39 class

- USS PGM-51 to Burma as PGM-405
- USS PGM-52 to Burma as PGM-406
- USS PGM-53 to Ethiopia as PC-13
- USS PGM-54 to Ethiopia as PC-14
- USS PGM-55 to Indonesia as Bentang Silungkang (P 572)
- USS PGM-56 to Indonesia as Bentang Waitatiri (P 571)
- USS PGM-57 to Indonesia as Bentang Kalukuang (P 570)
- USS PGM-58 to Ethiopia as PC-15

PGM-59 class

- USS PGM-59 to South Vietnam as Kim Qui (HQ 605)
- USS PGM-60 to South Vietnam as May Rut (HQ 606)
- USS PGM-61 to South Vietnam as Nam Du (HQ 607)
- USS PGM-62 to South Vietnam as Hoa Lu (HQ 608)
- USS PGM-63 to South Vietnam as To Yen (HQ 609)
- USS PGM-64 to South Vietnam as Phu Du (HQ 600)
- USS PGM-65 to South Vietnam as Tien Moi (HQ 601)
- USS PGM-66 to South Vietnam as Minh Hoa (HQ 602)
- USS PGM-67 to South Vietnam as Kien Vang (HQ 603)
- USS PGM-68 to South Vietnam as Keo Ngua (HQ 604)
- USS PGM-69 to South Vietnam as Dienh Hai (HQ 610)
- USS PGM-70 to South Vietnam as Truong Sa (HQ 611)

PGM-71 class

- USS PGM-71 to Thailand as T-11
- USS PGM-72 to South Vietnam as Thai Binh (HQ 612)
- USS PGM-73 to South Vietnam as Thi Tu (HQ 613)
- USS PGM-74 to South Vietnam as Song Tu (HQ 614)
- USS PGM-75 to Ecuador as Quito (LC 71)
- USS PGM-76 to Ecuador as Guayaquil (LC 72)
- USS PGM-77 to the Dominican Republic as Betelgeuse (GC 102)
- USS PGM-78 to Peru as Rio Sama (PC 11)
- USS PGM-79 to Thailand as T-12
- USS PGM-80 to South Vietnam as Tat Sa (HQ 615)
- USS PGM-81 to South Vietnam as Phu Quoi (HQ 617)
- USS PGM-82 to South Vietnam as Hoang Sa (HQ 616)
- USS PGM-83 to South Vietnam as Hon Troc (HQ 618) Escaped to the Philippines in 1976
- USS PGM-91 to South Vietnam as Tho Chau (HQ 619)
- USS PGM-102 to Liberia as Alert
- USS PGM-103 to Iran as Parvan (PGM 211)
- USS PGM-104 to Turkey as AB-21
- USS PGM-105 to Turkey as AB-22
- USS PGM-106 to Turkey as AB-23
- USS PGM-107 to Thailand as T-13
- USS PGM-108 to Turkey as AB-24
- USS PGM-111 to Peru as Rio Chira (PC 12)
- USS PGM-112 to Iran as Bahram (PGM 212)
- USS PGM-113 to Thailand as T-14
- USS PGM-114 to Thailand as T-15
- USS PGM-115 to Thailand as T-16
- USS PGM-116 to Thailand as T-17
- USS PGM-117 to Thailand as T-18
- USS PGM-122 to Iran as Nahid (PGM 213)
- USS PGM-123 to Thailand as T-19
- USS PGM-124 to Thailand as T-20

Asheville class

- USS Asheville (PGM-84)
- USS Gallup (PGM-85)
- USS Antelope (PGM-86)
- USS Ready (PGM-87)
- USS Crockett (PGM-88)
- USS Marathon (PG-89)
- USS Canon (PGM-90)
- USS Tacoma (PGM-92)
- USS Welch (PGM-93)
- USS Chehalis (PGM-94)
- USS Defiance (PGM-95)
- USS Benicia (PGM-96)
- USS Surprise (PGM-97)
- USS Grand Rapids (PGM-98)
- USS Beacon (PGM-99)
- USS Douglas (PGM-100)
- USS Green Bay (PGM-101)

Piratini class

- USS PGM-109 to Brazil as Piratini (P 10)
- USS PGM-110 to Brazil as Piraja (P 11)
- USS PGM-118 to Brazil as Pampeio (P 12)
- USS PGM-119 to Brazil as Parati (P 13)
- USS PGM-120 to Brazil as Penedo (P 14)
- USS PGM-121 to Brazil as Poti (P 15)

== Patrol river gunboat (PR) ==
All built in Shanghai to serve on the Yangtze Patrol.

- USS Palos (PR-1), ex-PG-16
- USS Monacacy (PR-2), ex-PG-20
- USS Wake (PR-3), ex-Guam (PG-43), captured by Japan 8 December 1941
- USS Tutuila (PR-4), ex-PG-44
- USS Panay (PR-5), ex-PG-45, sunk by Japanese aircraft 12 December 1937, 4 killed
- USS Oahu (PR-6), ex-PG-46, sunk by Japanese gunfire, Corregidor, 5 May 1942
- USS Luzon (PR-7), ex-PG-47, scuttled 6 May 1942 in Manila Bay
- USS Mindanao (PR-8), ex-PG-48, scuttled 2 May 1942 in Manila Bay

== Patrol yacht (PY) ==
By hull number

- USS Mayflower (PY-1)
- USS Hawk (PY-2)
- USS Scorpion (PY-3)
- USS Vixen (PY-4)
- USS Sylph (PY-5)
- USS Nokomis (PY-6), ex-SP-609
- USS Aramis (PY-7), ex-SP-418
- USS Dispatch (PY-8)
- USS Niagara (PY-9), ex-SP-136
- USS Isabel (PY-10), ex-SP-521
- USS Sylph (PY-12)
- USS Siren (PY-13)
- USS Argus (PY-14)
- USS Coral (PY-15), ex-SP-543
- USS Zircon (PY-16)
- USS Jade (PY-17)
- USS Turquoise (PY-18)
- USS Carnelian (PY-19)
- USS Tourmaline (PY-20)
- USS Ruby (PY-21)
- USS Azurlite (PY-22)
- USS Beryl (PY-23)
- USS Almandite (PY-24)
- USS Crystal (PY-25)
- USS Cythera (PY-26), ex-SP-575
- USS Girasol (PY-27)
- USS Marcasite (PY-28)
- USS Mizpah (PY-29)
- USS Hydrographer (PY-30)
- USS Cythera (PY-31)
- USS Southern Seas (PY-32), wrecked by Typhoon Louise Okinawa October 1945
By name

- USS Almandite (PY-24)
- USS Aramis (PY-7), ex-SP-418
- USS Argus (PY-14)
- USS Azurlite (PY-22)
- USS Beryl (PY-23)
- USS Carnelian (PY-19)
- USS Coral (PY-15), ex-SP-543
- USS Cythera (PY-26), ex-SP-575
- USS Cythera (PY-31)
- USS Crystal (PY-25)
- USS Dispatch (PY-8)
- USS Isabel (PY-10), ex-SP-521
- USS Jade (PY-17)
- USS Girasol (PY-27)
- USS Hawk (PY-2)
- USS Hydrographer (PY-30)
- USS Mayflower (PY-1)
- USS Marcasite (PY-28)
- USS Mizpah (PY-29)
- USS Nakomis (PY-6), ex-SP-609
- USS Niagara (PY-9), ex-SP-136
- USS Ruby (PY-21)
- USS Scorpion (PY-3)
- USS Sylph (PY-12)
- USS Siren (PY-13)
- USS Southern Seas (PY-32), wrecked
- USS Sylph (PY-5)
- USS Tourmaline (PY-20)
- USS Turquoise (PY-18)
- USS Vixen (PY-4)
- USS Zircon (PY-16)

== Patrol yacht, coastal (PYc) ==
By hull number

- USS Emerald (PYc-1)
- USS Sapphire (PYc-2)
- USS Amethyst (PYc-3)
- USS Agate (PYc-4) ex-AM-78
- USS Onyx (PYc-5)
- USS Amber (PYc-6)
- USS Aquamarine (PYc-7)
- USS Opal (PYc-8) ex-Coronet
- USS Moonstone (PYc-9)
- USS Topaz (PYc-10)
- USS Andradite (PYc-11)
- USS Sardonyx (PYc-12)
- USS Jasper (PYc-13)
- USS Truant (PYc-14)
- USS Garnet (PYc-15)
- USS Chalcedony (PYc-16)
- USS Pyrope (PYc-17)
- USS Peridot (PYc-18)
- USS Rhodolite (PYc-19)
- USS Jet (PYc-20)
- USS Alabaster (PYc-21)
- USS Olivin (PYc-22)
- USS Sard (PYc-23)
- USS Phenakite (PYc-25), ex-SP-192
- USS Cymophane (PYc-26)
- USS Colleen (PYc-27)
- USS Ability (PYc-28)
- USS Gallant (PYc-29)
- USS Vagrant (PYc-30) ex-YP-258
- USS Lash (PYc-31)
- USS Tourist (PYc-32), later YAG-14
- USS Brave (PYc-34), later YP-425
- USS Felicia (PYc-35)
- USS Paragon (PYc-36)
- USS Mentor (PYc-37)
- USS Carolita (PYc-38)
- USS Marnell (PYc-39)
- USS Captor (PYc-40) ex-AM 132, Q-ship (armed decoy)
- USS Iolite (PYc-41)
- USS Leader (PYc-42)
- USS Sea Scout (PYc-43)
- USS Perseverance (PYc-44)
- USS Black Douglas (PYc-45) ex-IX-55
- USS Impetuous (PYc-46) ex-PC-454
- USS Patriot (PYc-47) ex-PC-455
- USS Persistent (PYc-48) ex-PC-456
- USS Retort (PYc-49) ex-PC-458
- USS Sturdy (PYc-50) ex-PC-460
- USS Valiant (PYc-51) ex-PC-509
- USS Venture (PYc-52) ex-PC-826
By name

- USS Ability (PYc-28)
- USS Agate (PYc-4) ex-AM-78
- USS Alabaster (PYc-21)
- USS Amber (PYc-6)
- USS Amethyst (PYc-3)
- USS Andradite (PYc-11)
- USS Aquamarine (PYc-7)
- USS Black Douglas (PYc-45) ex-IX-55
- USS Brave (PYc-34), later YP-425
- USS Captor (PYc-40) ex-AM 132, Q-ship (armed decoy)
- USS Carolita (PYc-38)
- USS Chalcedony (PYc-16)
- USS Colleen (PYc-27)
- USS Cymophane (PYc-26)
- USS Emerald (PYc-1)
- USS Felicia (PYc-35)
- USS Gallant (PYc-29)
- USS Garnet (PYc-15)
- USS Impetuous (PYc-46) ex-PC-454
- USS Iolite (PYc-41)
- USS Jasper (PYc-13)
- USS Jet (PYc-20)
- USS Lash (PYc-31)
- USS Leader (PYc-42)
- USS Marnell (PYc-39)
- USS Mentor (PYc-37)
- USS Moonstone (PYc-9)
- USS Olivin (PYc-22)
- USS Onyx (PYc-5)
- USS Opal (PYc-8) ex-Coronet
- USS Paragon (PYc-36)
- USS Patriot (PYc-47) ex-PC-455
- USS Peridot (PYc-18)
- USS Perseverance (PYc-44)
- USS Persistent (PYc-48) ex-PC-456
- USS Phenakite (PYc-25)
- USS Pyrope (PYc-17)
- USS Retort (PYc-49) ex-PC-458
- USS Rhodolite (PYc-19)
- USS Sard (PYc-23)
- USS Sardonyx (PYc-12)
- USS Sapphire (PYc-2)
- USS Sea Scout (PYc-43)
- USS Sturdy (PYc-50) ex-PC-460
- USS Topaz (PYc-10)
- USS Tourist (PYc-32), later YAG-14
- USS Truant (PYc-14)
- USS Valiant (PYc-51) ex-PC-509
- USS Vagrant (PYc-30) ex-YP-258
- USS Venture (PYc-52) ex-PC-826

== Submarine chaser (SC) ==
These submarine chasers were 110 feet long and used the SC designation. The large missing sections of numbers in designation for the most part come from sharing the same number set as the other bigger 173 foot subchasers that used the PC designation.

=== SC-1 class (SC-1 to SC-448) ===
- List of SC-1-class subchasers (SC-1 to SC-50)
- List of SC-1-class subchasers (SC-51 to SC-100)
- List of SC-1-class subchasers (SC-101 to SC-150)
- List of SC-1-class subchasers (SC-151 to SC-200)
- List of SC-1-class subchasers (SC-201 to SC-250)
- List of SC-1-class subchasers (SC-251 to SC-300)
- List of SC-1-class subchasers (SC-301 to SC-350)
- List of SC-1-class subchasers (SC-351 to SC-400)
- List of SC-1-class subchasers (SC-401 to SC-448)
- USS SC-1
- USS SC-2
- USS SC-3
- USS SC-4
- SC-5 built for France
- USS SC-6
- SC-7 built for France
- USS SC-8
- SC-9 built for France
- SC-10 built for France
- SC-11 built for France
- SC-12 built for France
- SC-13 built for France
- SC-14 built for France
- SC-15 built for France
- SC-16 built for France
- USS SC-17
- USS SC-18
- USS SC-19
- USS SC-20
- USS SC-21
- USS SC-22
- USS SC-23
- USS SC-24
- USS SC-25
- USS SC-26
- USS SC-27
- SC-28 built for France
- SC-29 built for France
- SC-30 built for France
- SC-31 built for France
- SC-32 built for France
- SC-33 built for France
- USS SC-34
- USS SC-35
- USS SC-36
- USS SC-37
- USS SC-38
- USS SC-39
- USS SC-40
- USS SC-41
- USS SC-42
- USS SC-43
- USS SC-44
- USS SC-45
- USS SC-46
- USS SC-47
- USS SC-48
- USS SC-49
- USS SC-50
- USS SC-51
- USS SC-52
- USS SC-53
- USS SC-54
- USS SC-55
- USS SC-56
- USS SC-57
- USS SC-58
- USS SC-59
- USS SC-60
- USS SC-61
- USS SC-62
- USS SC-63
- USS SC-64 reclassified YW-97
- SC-65 built for France
- SC-66 built for France
- SC-67 built for France
- USS SC-68
- USS SC-69
- USS SC-70
- USS SC-71
- USS SC-72
- USS SC-73
- USS SC-74
- SC-75 built for France
- SC-76 built for France
- USS SC-77
- USS SC-78
- USS SC-79
- USS SC-80
- USS SC-81
- USS SC-82
- USS SC-83
- USS SC-84
- USS SC-85
- USS SC-86
- USS SC-87
- USS SC-88
- USS SC-89
- USS SC-90
- USS SC-91
- USS SC-92
- USS SC-93
- USS SC-94
- USS SC-95
- USS SC-96
- USS SC-97
- USS SC-98
- USS SC-99
- USS SC-100
- USS SC-101
- USS SC-102
- USS SC-103
- USS SC-104
- USS SC-105
- USS SC-106
- USS SC-107
- USS SC-108
- USS SC-109
- USS SC-110
- USS SC-111
- USS SC-112
- USS SC-113
- USS SC-114
- USS SC-115
- USS SC-116
- USS SC-117
- USS SC-118
- USS SC-119
- USS SC-120
- USS SC-121
- USS SC-122
- USS SC-123
- USS SC-124
- USS SC-125
- USS SC-126
- USS SC-127
- USS SC-128
- USS SC-129
- USS SC-130
- USS SC-131
- USS SC-132
- USS SC-133
- USS SC-134
- USS SC-135
- USS SC-136
- USS SC-137
- USS SC-138
- USS SC-139
- USS SC-140
- USS SC-141
- USS SC-142
- USS SC-143
- USS SC-144
- USS SC-145
- USS SC-146
- USS SC-147
- USS SC-148
- USS SC-149
- USS SC-150
- USS SC-151
- USS SC-152
- USS SC-153
- USS SC-154
- USS SC-155
- USS SC-156
- USS SC-157
- USS SC-158
- USS SC-159
- USS SC-160
- USS SC-161
- USS SC-162
- USS SC-163
- USS SC-164
- USS SC-165
- USS SC-166
- USS SC-167
- USS SC-168
- USS SC-169
- USS SC-170
- USS SC-171
- USS SC-172
- USS SC-173
- USS SC-174
- USS SC-175
- USS SC-176
- USS SC-177
- USS SC-178
- USS SC-179
- USS SC-180
- USS SC-181
- USS SC-182
- USS SC-183
- USS SC-184
- USS SC-185
- USS SC-186
- USS SC-187
- USS SC-188
- USS SC-189
- USS SC-190
- USS SC-191
- USS SC-192
- USS SC-193
- USS SC-194
- USS SC-195
- USS SC-196
- USS SC-197
- USS SC-198
- USS SC-199
- USS SC-200
- USS SC-201
- USS SC-202
- USS SC-203
- USS SC-204
- USS SC-205
- USS SC-206
- USS SC-207
- USS SC-208
- USS SC-209
- USS SC-210
- USS SC-211
- USS SC-212
- USS SC-213
- USS SC-214
- USS SC-215
- USS SC-216
- USS SC-217
- USS SC-218
- USS SC-219
- USS SC-220
- USS SC-221
- USS SC-222
- USS SC-223
- USS SC-224
- USS SC-225
- USS SC-226
- USS SC-227
- USS SC-228
- USS SC-229
- USS SC-230
- USS SC-231
- USS SC-232
- USS SC-233
- USS SC-234
- USS SC-235
- USS SC-236
- USS SC-237
- USS SC-238
- USS SC-239
- USS SC-240
- USS SC-241
- USS SC-242
- USS SC-243
- USS SC-244
- USS SC-245
- USS SC-246
- USS SC-247
- USS SC-248
- USS SC-249
- USS SC-250
- USS SC-251
- USS SC-252
- USS SC-253
- USS SC-254
- USS SC-255
- USS SC-256
- USS SC-257
- USS SC-258
- USS SC-259
- USS SC-260
- USS SC-261
- USS SC-262
- USS SC-263
- USS SC-264
- USS SC-265
- USS SC-266
- USS SC-267
- USS SC-268
- USS SC-269
- USS SC-270
- USS SC-271
- USS SC-272
- USS SC-273
- USS SC-274
- USS SC-275
- USS SC-276
- USS SC-277
- USS SC-278
- USS SC-279
- USS SC-280
- USS SC-281
- USS SC-282
- USS SC-283
- USS SC-284
- USS SC-285
- USS SC-286
- USS SC-287
- USS SC-288
- USS SC-289
- USS SC-290
- USS SC-291
- USS SC-292 1920 sold commercial becoming Trawler "Chief Seattle"
- USS SC-293 1920 sold commercial becoming Trawler "George L. Harvey"
- USS SC-294
- USS SC-295
- USS SC-296
- USS SC-297
- USS SC-298
- USS SC-299
- USS SC-300 1920 sold commercial becoming Trawler "Joseph Kildall"
- USS SC-301
- USS SC-302
- USS SC-303
- USS SC-304
- USS SC-305
- USS SC-306
- USS SC-307
- USS SC-308
- USS SC-309
- USS SC-310
- USS SC-311
- USS SC-312
- SC-313 built for France
- SC-314 built for France
- SC-315 built for France
- SC-316 built for France
- USS SC-317
- SC-318 built for France
- SC-319 built for France
- USS SC-320
- USS SC-321
- USS SC-322
- USS SC-323
- USS SC-324
- USS SC-325
- USS SC-326
- USS SC-327
- USS SC-328
- USS SC-329
- USS SC-330
- USS SC-331
- USS SC-332
- USS SC-333
- USS SC-334
- USS SC-335
- USS SC-336
- USS SC-337
- USS SC-338
- USS SC-339
- USS SC-340
- USS SC-341
- USS SC-342
- USS SC-343
- USS SC-344
- USS SC-345
- USS SC-346
- SC-347 built for France
- SC-348 built for France
- USS SC-349
- SC-350 built for France
- USS SC-351
- USS SC-352
- USS SC-353
- USS SC-354
- USS SC-355
- USS SC-356
- SC-357 to SC-369 built for France
- USS SC-370 later to France as FS C-14
- SC-371 to SC-387 built for France
- USS SC-388 later to France as FS C-28
- SC-389 to SC-402 built for France
- USS SC-403 later to France as FS C-97
- SC-404 built for France
- USS SC-405 later to France as FS C-99
- SC-406 built for France
- USS SC-407
- USS SC-408
- USS SC-409
- USS SC-410
- USS SC-411
- USS SC-412
- USS SC-413
- USS SC-414
- USS SC-415
- USS SC-416
- USS SC-417
- USS SC-418
- USS SC-419
- USS SC-420
- USS SC-421
- USS SC-422
- USS SC-423
- USS SC-424
- USS SC-425
- USS SC-426
- USS SC-427
- USS SC-428
- USS SC-429
- USS SC-430
- USS SC-431
- USS SC-432
- USS SC-433
- USS SC-434
- USS SC-435
- USS SC-436
- USS SC-437
- USS SC-438
- USS SC-439
- USS SC-440
- USS SC-441
- USS SC-442
- USS SC-443
- USS SC-444
- USS SC-445
- USS SC-446
- USS SC-447
- USS SC-448

=== SC 497 class ===
SC-497 class

Mainly SC-497 to 775, SC-977 to 1076, SC-1267 to 1367, SC-1474 to 1626. Also several were modified to be SCC's a command versions.
All 1945 transfers to the Soviet Union (USSR) occurred under Project Hula.

- USS SC-497
- USS SC-498
- USS SC-499
- USS SC-500, to USSR 10 June 1945
- USS SC-501 ex-PC-501, later Racer (IX-100)
- USS SC-502
- USS SC-503
- USS SC-504
- USS SC-505
- USS SC-506
- USS SC-507
- USS SC-508

509 and 510 used by PC submarine chasers

- USS SC-511
- USS SC-512
- USS SC-513
- USS SC-514
- USS SC-515
- USS SC-516
- USS SC-517
- USS SC-518
- USS SC-519
- USS SC-520
- USS SC-521, foundered 10 July 1945 off Santa Cruz, Solomon Islands
- USS SC-522

523 used by PC submarine chaser

- USS SC-524
- USS SC-525
- USS SC-526
- USS SC-527
- USS SC-528
- USS SC-529
- USS SC-530
- USS SC-531
- USS SC-532
- USS SC-533
- USS SC-534
- USS SC-535
- USS SC-536
- USS SC-537, to USSR 26 May 1945
- USS SC-538, to USSR 17 August 1945
- USS SC-539
- USS SC-540
- USS SC-541
- USS SC-542
- USS SC-543
- USS SC-544
- USS SC-545
- USS SC-546
- USS SC-547
- USS SC-548
- USS SC-549
- USS SC-550
- USS SC-551
- USS SC-552
- USS SC-553
- USS SC-554
- USS SC-555
- USS SC-556
- USS SC-557
- USS SC-558
- USS SC-559
- USS SC-560
- USS SC-561
- USS SC-562
- USS SC-563
- USS SC-564
- USS SC-565
- USS SC-566
- USS SC-567
- USS SC-568
- USS SC-569
- USS SC-570
- USS SC-571
- USS SC-572
- USS SC-573
- USS SC-574
- USS SC-575
- USS SC-576
- USS SC-577
- USS SC-578
- USS SC-579
- USS SC-580
- USS SC-581
- USS SC-582
- USS SC-583
- USS SC-584
- USS SC-585
- USS SC-586
- USS SC-587
- USS SC-588
- USS SC-589
- USS SC-590
- USS SC-591
- USS SC-592
- USS SC-593
- USS SC-594
- USS SC-595
- USS SC-596
- USS SC-597
- USS SC-598
- USS SC-599
- USS SC-600
- USS SC-601
- USS SC-602
- USS SC-603
- USS SC-604
- USS SC-605
- USS SC-606
- USS SC-607
- USS SC-608
- USS SC-609
- USS SC-610
- USS SC-611
- USS SC-612
- USS SC-613
- USS SC-614
- USS SC-615
- USS SC-616
- USS SC-617
- USS SC-618
- USS SC-619
- USS SC-620
- USS SC-621
- USS SC-622
- USS SC-623
- USS SC-624
- USS SC-625
- USS SC-626
- USS SC-627
- USS SC-628
- USS SC-629
- USS SC-630
- USS SC-631
- USS SC-632, foundered in Typhoon Ida, Okinawa, 16 September 1945
- USS SC-633
- USS SC-634, to USSR 10 June 1945
- USS SC-635
- USS SC-636, foundered in Typhoon Louise, Okinawa, 9 October 1945
- USS SC-637
- USS SC-638
- USS SC-639
- USS SC-640
- USS SC-641
- USS SC-642
- USS SC-643, to USSR 17 August 1945
- USS SC-644, later PGM-1
- USS SC-645
- USS SC-646, to USSR 26 May 1945
- USS SC-647, to USSR 26 May 1945
- USS SC-648
- USS SC-649
- USS SC-650
- USS SC-651
- USS SC-652
- USS SC-653
- USS SC-654
- USS SC-655
- USS SC-656
- USS SC-657, to USSR 5 June 1945
- USS SC-658
- USS SC-659
- USS SC-660, to USSR 5 June 1945
- USS SC-661, to USSR 26 May 1945
- USS SC-662
- USS SC-663, to USSR 5 June 1945
- USS SC-664
- USS SC-665
- USS SC-666
- USS SC-667
- USS SC-668
- USS SC-669
- USS SC-670
- USS SC-671
- USS SC-672
- USS SC-673, to USSR 5 June 1945
- USS SC-674, to USSR 26 May 1945
- USS SC-675, to USSR 10 June 1945
- USS SC-676
- USS SC-677
- USS SC-678
- USS SC-679
- USS SC-680
- USS SC-681
- USS SC-682
- USS SC-683
- USS SC-684
- USS SC-685, to USSR 19 July 1945
- USS SC-686
- USS SC-687, to USSR 26 May 1945
- USS SC-688
- USS SC-689
- USS SC-690
- USS SC-691
- USS SC-692
- USS SC-693
- USS SC-694, sunk by aircraft 23 August 1943
- USS SC-695
- USS SC-696, sunk by aircraft 23 August 1943, 18 killed
- USS SC-697
- USS SC-698
- USS SC-699
- USS SC-700
- USS SC-701
- USS SC-702
- USS SC-703
- USS SC-704
- USS SC-705
- USS SC-706
- USS SC-707
- USS SC-708
- USS SC-709
- USS SC-710
- USS SC-711
- USS SC-712
- USS SC-713, to USSR 5 June 1945
- USS SC-714
- USS SC-715
- USS SC-716
- USS SC-717
- USS SC-718
- USS SC-719
- USS SC-720
- USS SC-721
- USS SC-722
- USS SC-723
- USS SC-724
- USS SC-725
- USS SC-726
- USS SC-727
- USS SC-728
- USS SC-729
- USS SC-730
- USS SC-731
- USS SC-732
- USS SC-733
- USS SC-734
- USS SC-735
- USS SC-736
- USS SC-737
- USS SC-738
- USS SC-739
- USS SC-740
- USS SC-741
- USS SC-742
- USS SC-743
- USS SC-744, sunk by Kamikaze 27 November 1944, 1 killed
- USS SC-745
- USS SC-746
- USS SC-747
- USS SC-748
- USS SC-749
- USS SC-750
- USS SC-751
- USS SC-752, to USSR 17 August 1945
- USS SC-753
- USS SC-754, to USSR 17 August 1945
- USS SC-755
- USS SC-756, to USSR 2 September 1945
- USS SC-757, later PGM-2
- USS SC-758
- USS SC-759
- USS SC-760
- USS SC-761
- USS SC-762
- USS SC-763
- USS SC-764
- USS SC-765
- USS SC-766
- USS SC-767
- USS SC-768
- USS SC-769
- USS SC-770
- USS SC-771
- USS SC-772
- USS SC-773
- USS SC-774, to USSR 17 August 1945
- USS SC-775

776-976 used by PC submarine chasers

- USS SC-977
- USS SC-978
- USS SC-979
- USS SC-980
- USS SC-981
- USS SC-982
- USS SC-983
- USS SC-984
- USS SC-985
- USS SC-986, to USSR 5 June 1945
- USS SC-987
- USS SC-988
- USS SC-989
- USS SC-990
- USS SC-991
- USS SC-992
- USS SC-993
- USS SC-994
- USS SC-995
- USS SC-996
- USS SC-997, to USSR 17 August 1945
- USS SC-998
- USS SC-999
- USS SC-1000
- USS SC-1001
- USS SC-1002
- USS SC-1003
- USS SC-1004
- USS SC-1005
- USS SC-1006
- USS SC-1007, to USSR 17 August 1945
- USS SC-1008
- USS SC-1009
- USS SC-1010
- USS SC-1011, to USSR 17 August 1945
- USS SC-1012, grounded by Typhoon Louise, Okinawa, 9 October 1945
- USS SC-1013
- USS SC-1014
- USS SC-1015
- USS SC-1016
- USS SC-1017
- USS SC-1018
- USS SC-1019
- USS SC-1020
- USS SC-1021, to USSR 5 June 1945
- USS SC-1022
- USS SC-1023
- USS SC-1024, sunk in collision 2 March 1943
- USS SC-1025
- USS SC-1026
- USS SC-1027
- USS SC-1028
- USS SC-1029
- USS SC-1030
- USS SC-1031, to USSR 17 August 1945
- USS SC-1032
- USS SC-1033
- USS SC-1034
- USS SC-1035, later PGM-3
- USS SC-1036
- USS SC-1037
- USS SC-1038
- USS SC-1039
- USS SC-1040
- USS SC-1041
- USS SC-1042
- USS SC-1043
- USS SC-1044
- USS SC-1045
- USS SC-1046
- USS SC-1047
- USS SC-1048
- USS SC-1049
- USS SC-1050
- USS SC-1051
- USS SC-1052
- USS SC-1053, later PGM-4
- USS SC-1054, later PGM-5
- USS SC-1055
- USS SC-1056
- USS SC-1057
- USS SC-1058
- USS SC-1059
- USS SC-1060, to USSR 5 June 1945
- USS SC-1061
- USS SC-1062
- USS SC-1063
- USS SC-1064
- USS SC-1065
- USS SC-1066
- USS SC-1067
- USS SC-1068
- USS SC-1069
- USS SC-1070
- USS SC-1071, later PGM-6
- USS SC-1072, later PGM-7
- USS SC-1073
- USS SC-1074
- USS SC-1075
- USS SC-1076

1077-1265 used by PC submarine chasers

- USS SC-1266
- USS SC-1267
- USS SC-1268
- USS SC-1269
- USS SC-1270
- USS SC-1271
- USS SC-1272
- USS SC-1273
- USS SC-1274
- USS SC-1275
- USS SC-1276
- USS SC-1277
- USS SC-1278
- USS SC-1279
- USS SC-1280
- USS SC-1281
- USS SC-1282
- USS SC-1283
- USS SC-1284
- USS SC-1285
- USS SC-1286
- USS SC-1287
- USS SC-1288
- USS SC-1289
- USS SC-1290
- USS SC-1291
- USS SC-1292
- USS SC-1293
- USS SC-1294
- USS SC-1295, to USSR 10 June 1945
- USS SC-1296
- USS SC-1297
- USS SC-1298
- USS SC-1299
- USS SC-1300
- USS SC-1301
- USS SC-1302
- USS SC-1303
- USS SC-1304
- USS SC-1305
- USS SC-1306
- USS SC-1307
- USS SC-1308
- USS SC-1309
- USS SC-1310
- USS SC-1311
- USS SC-1312
- USS SC-1313
- USS SC-1314
- USS SC-1315
- USS SC-1316
- USS SC-1317
- USS SC-1318
- USS SC-1319
- USS SC-1320
- USS SC-1321
- USS SC-1322
- USS SC-1323
- USS SC-1324, to USSR 10 June 1945
- USS SC-1325
- USS SC-1326
- USS SC-1327
- USS SC-1328
- USS SC-1329
- USS SC-1330
- USS SC-1331
- USS SC-1332
- USS SC-1333
- USS SC-1334
- USS SC-1335
- USS SC-1336
- USS SC-1337
- USS SC-1338
- USS SC-1339
- USS SC-1340
- USS SC-1341
- USS SC-1342
- USS SC-1343
- USS SC-1344
- USS SC-1345
- USS SC-1346
- USS SC-1347
- USS SC-1348
- USS SC-1349
- USS SC-1350
- USS SC-1351
- USS SC-1352
- USS SC-1353
- USS SC-1354
- USS SC-1355
- USS SC-1356
- USS SC-1357
- USS SC-1358
- USS SC-1359
- USS SC-1360
- USS SC-1361
- USS SC-1362
- USS SC-1363
- USS SC-1364, to USSR 17 August 1945
- USS SC-1365, to USSR 17 August 1945
- USS SC-1366, later PGM-8
- USS SC-1367

=== SC-1466 to SC-1473 ===
These were British design Fairmile B motor launches built in Canada and loaned to US.

=== SC-1474 to SC-1626 ===
- USS SC-1474 / SCC-1474
- USS SC-1475
- USS SC-1476
- USS SC-1477
- USS SC-1478
- USS SC-1479
- USS SC-1480
- USS SC-1481
- USS SC-1482
- USS SC-1483
- USS SC-1484
- USS SC-1485
- USS SC-1486
- USS SC-1487
- USS SC-1488
- USS SC-1489
- USS SC-1490
- USS SC-1491
- USS SC-1492
- USS SC-1493
- USS SC-1494
- SC-1495 Cancelled 9/17/43
- USS SC-1496
- USS SC-1497
- USS SC-1498
- USS SC-1499
- USS SC-1500
- SC-1501 Cancelled 9/17/43
- USS SC-1502
- USS SC-1503
- USS SC-1504
- USS SC-1505
- USS SC-1506
- USS SC-1507
- USS SC-1508
- SC-1509 Cancelled 9/17/43
- USS SC-1510
- USS SC-1511
- USS SC-1512
- SC-1513 to SC-1516 Cancelled 9/17/43
- USS SC-1517
- SC-1518 to SC-1520 Cancelled 8/17/43
- SC-1521 to SC-1545 Cancelled 8/1/43

(incomplete listing)

== World War I section patrol (SP) series ==
Civilian boats and ships were registered during World War I for potential use as section patrol (SP) craft and given "SP" identification numbers in the "ID/SP" numbering series.

== See also ==
- List of current ships of the United States Navy
- List of United States Navy ships
- List of United States Navy losses in World War II § Patrol craft - abbreviated list
- List of U.S. Navy ships sunk or damaged in action during World War II § Patrol ships - detailed list
