= USS Valiant (PYc-51) =

Patrol vessel of the United States Navy

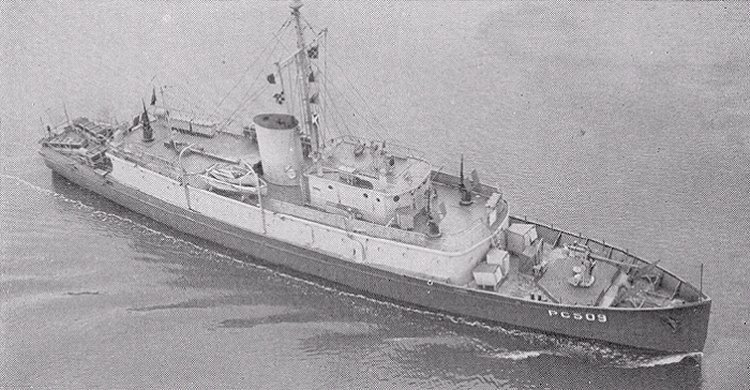
- USS PC-509 around 1943, the year in which she was renamed USS Valiant (PYc-51).

History

United States
- Name: USS PC-509 (1941-1943); USS Valiant (1943-1944)
- Builder: Herreshoff Manufacturing Company, Bristol, Rhode Island
- Completed: 1929
- Acquired: 7 October 1940
- Commissioned: 27 December 1941
- Decommissioned: September 1944
- Renamed: USS Valiant 15 July 1943
- Reclassified: From "submarine chaser" (PC-509) to "coastal patrol yacht" (PYc-51) 15 July 1943
- Stricken: 14 October 1944
- Fate: Sold 15 June 1945
- Notes: Operated as private yacht Vara 1929-1940

General characteristics
- Type: Submarine chaser (1941-1943); Coastal patrol yacht (1943-1944)
- Displacement: 190 tons
- Length: 150 ft 0 in (45.72 m)
- Beam: 24 ft 0 in (7.32 m)
- Draft: 8 ft 6 in (2.59 m) mean
- Propulsion: Diesel engines, two shafts
- Speed: 15 knots
- Armament: 1 x 3"/50 (76.2-mm) caliber gun; 3 x 20mm AA gun; Depth charges

USS Valiant (PYc-51), originally USS PC-509, was a United States Navy patrol vessel in commission from 1941 to 1944.

== Construction and acquisition ==
Valiant was built in 1929 as the private yacht Vara by the Herreshoff Manufacturing Company at Bristol, Rhode Island. The U.S. Navy acquired Vara from her owner, Harold S. "Mike" Vanderbilt (1884–1970), on 7 October 1940. She was converted for naval service at the New York Navy Yard in Brooklyn, New York, classified as a submarine chaser (PC), and commissioned as USS PC-509 on 27 December 1941 at New York City.

== Operational history ==
PC-509 was assigned to the Panama Canal Zone, where she was based throughout her naval career, and tasked with escorting convoys in the Gulf of Mexico and the Caribbean Sea. She reached the Canal Zone on 2 February 1942. From February 1942 through April 1943, she escorted convoys according to a varied itinerary that included visits to Guantanamo Bay and Havana in Cuba; Jacksonville, Miami, and Key West in Florida; and Charleston, South Carolina.

In May 1943, PC-509 began to concentrate on the Canal Zone-Guantanamo Bay convoy route exclusively. On 15 July 1943, she was classified as a coastal patrol yacht (PYc), renamed USS Valiant, and redesignated PYc-51.

Between May 1943 and August 1944, she escorted seven convoys from the Panama Canal Zone to Guantanamo Bay; after the first six of these, she escorted another convoy back to the Canal Zone. Between convoys, she conducted routine patrols and participated in searches for German submarines, although there is no record of her ever seeing combat.

Valiant escorted her seventh convoy from the Canal Zone safely into Guantanamo Bay on 25 August 1944. This time, instead of escorting a convoy back to the Canal Zone, she headed north for inactivation. She stopped briefly at Charleston on 28 August 1944 and arrived at Philadelphia, Pennsylvania, on 31 August 1944.

== Decommissioning and disposal ==
Valiant was decommissioned at Philadelphia sometime in September 1944 and turned over to the Commandant, 4th Naval District, for disposal. She was stricken from the Navy List on 14 October 1944 and sold by the War Shipping Administration on 15 June 1945.
