= USS Persistent (PYc-48) =

History

United States
- Launched: 1931
- Acquired: 13 August 1940
- Commissioned: 16 October 1940
- Decommissioned: 27 September 1944
- Stricken: 14 October 1944

General characteristics
- Displacement: 110 tons
- Length: 120 ft (37 m)
- Beam: 22 ft (6.7 m)
- Draught: 6 ft 6 in (1.98 m)
- Speed: 12 kts
- Armament: 4 mg., 2 dct.

The first USS Persistent (PYc-48) was a submarine chaser of the United States Navy.

Persistent, built as Onwego in 1931, was purchased from the estate of Mr. G. L. Bourne, New York, 13 August 1940; renamed PC–456, 13 September; converted at the New York Navy Yard; and commissioned 16 October 1940.

Assigned to the 15th Naval District, PC–456 arrived in the Panama Canal Zone 13 November 1940.

Renamed and reclassified Persistent (PYc–48), 16 June 1943, she patrolled in and off the Canal Zone until the summer of 1944 when she sailed for Philadelphia, Pennsylvania and deactivation. Arriving 31 August, she decommissioned 27 September and was struck from the Navy List 14 October.
