= USS Emerald (PYc-1) =

Patrol vessel of the United States Navy

History

United States
- Name: Tamarack IV (1922–1927); Savitar (1927–1940)
- Namesake: Tamarack
- Owner: Dr. Henry Norton Torrey (1922–1927); Joseph H. Seaman (1927–1941)
- Builder: Consolidated Shipbuilding Company, Morris Heights, New York
- Launched: 1922
- Identification: Official number:222502; Signal letters:MDQR
- Fate: Acquired by the Navy 25 October 1940

United States
- Name: Emerald
- Namesake: Emerald
- Acquired: 25 October 1940
- Commissioned: 27 December 1940
- Decommissioned: 11 August 1942
- Identification: Hull symbol:PYc-1; Code letters:NCBT
- Fate: Maritime Commission

General characteristics
- Type: Yacht
- Tonnage: 104 GRT
- Length: 96 ft (29 m)
- Beam: 17 ft (5.2 m)
- Draft: 7 ft 6 in (2.29 m)
- Installed power: 2 × Imperial in-line eight cylinder gasoline engines; 600 bhp (450 kW)
- Propulsion: 2 × screws
- Speed: 14 knots (26 km/h; 16 mph)
- Complement: 32

The third USS Emerald (PYC-1), was a yacht built in 1922 as Tamarack IV by the Consolidated Shipbuilding Company in Morris Heights, New York. She was acquired by the US Navy on 25 October 1940 and commissioned 27 December 1940.

== World War II service ==
After calling at Norfolk, Virginia, Emerald arrived at Jacksonville, Florida, 13 February 1941 for patrol duty off the Florida coast, and served as harbor entrance control station in Saint Johns River between December 1941 and March 1942. Her last service was as examination ship at Key West, Florida, and on 31 May Emerald arrived at Miami, where she lay until decommissioned 11 August 1942. She was transferred to the Maritime Commission for disposal 13 November 1945.
