= USS Patriot (PYc-47) =

History

United States
- Name: Patriot
- Builder: Herreshoff Manufacturing Company
- Launched: 1930
- Acquired: 20 September 1940
- In service: 27 February 1941
- Out of service: 28 September 1944
- Stricken: 14 October 1944
- Fate: Resold to original owner

General characteristics
- Displacement: 83 tons
- Length: 96 ft 6 in (29.41 m)
- Beam: 16 ft 5 in (5.00 m)
- Draft: 6 ft (1.8 m)
- Speed: 18 knots
- Armament: 1 x 3"/50 gun; 2 x depth charge tracks; 2 x machine gun

USS Patriot (PYc-47), formerly the Katoura, was built in 1930 by the Herreshoff Manufacturing Company in Bristol, Rhode Island United States and purchased by the United States Navy, for $1.00, from Mr. A. Loomis of New York City on 20 September 1940. She was converted for Navy service as a submarine chaser at the Greenport Basin and Construction Company at Greenport, New York, and designated PC–455 on 4 November 1940. She was placed in service 27 February 1941.

On 1 March 1941, PC–455 departed New York City for Boston, Massachusetts, where she reported for duty in the 1st Naval District. There she conducted coastal patrol assignments as PC–455 until 16 June 1943 when she was named Patriot and redesignated PYc–47. As Patriot she continued her patrols until placed out of service 28 September 1944. She was then laid up at Quincy, Massachusetts, to await transfer to the Maritime Commission. Struck from the Naval Vessel Register on 14 October 1944, she was turned over to the War Shipping Administration 14 March 1945 and subsequently sold back to her former owner for the nominal price of $1.00.
