= USS PGM-4 =

Motor gunboat from World War II

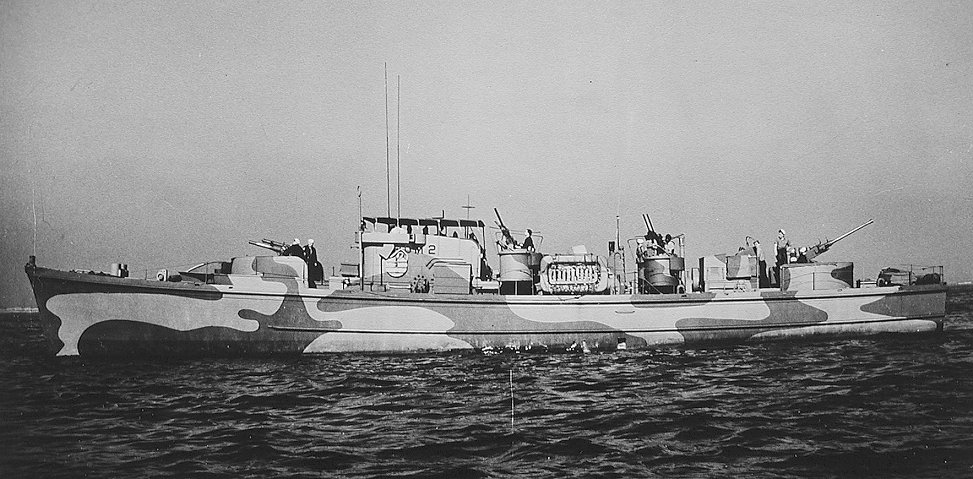
- USS PGM-2, a similar PGM-1 class motor gunboat

History

United States
- Name: PGM-4
- Laid down: 11 April 1942
- Launched: 27 June 1942
- Commissioned: 17 March 1943
- Renamed: 10 December 1943
- Reclassified: 10 December 1943
- Fate: Unknown

General characteristics
- Displacement: 95 tons
- Length: 110 feet 10 inches
- Beam: 23
- Height: 10 feet 10 inches
- Propulsion: 2 × 1,540bhp Electro-Motive Corp. 16-184A diesel engines; 2 × shafts
- Speed: 21 knots
- Complement: 28
- Armament: 2 x 40 mm guns; 4 × twin .50 cal (12.7 mm) machine gun

USS PGM-4 was a PGM-1 class motor gunboat that served in the United States Navy during World War II. She was originally laid down as an SC-497 class submarine chaser on 11 April 1942 by the Wilmington Boat Works, Inc. in Wilmington, California and launched on 7 September 1942. She was commissioned as USS SC-1053 on 17 March 1943. She was later converted to a PGM-1 class motor gunboat and renamed PGM-4 on 10 December 1943. After the war she was transferred to the Foreign Liquidations Commission on 9 June 1947. Her exact fate is unknown.
