= USS PGM-8 =

Gunboat of the United States Navy

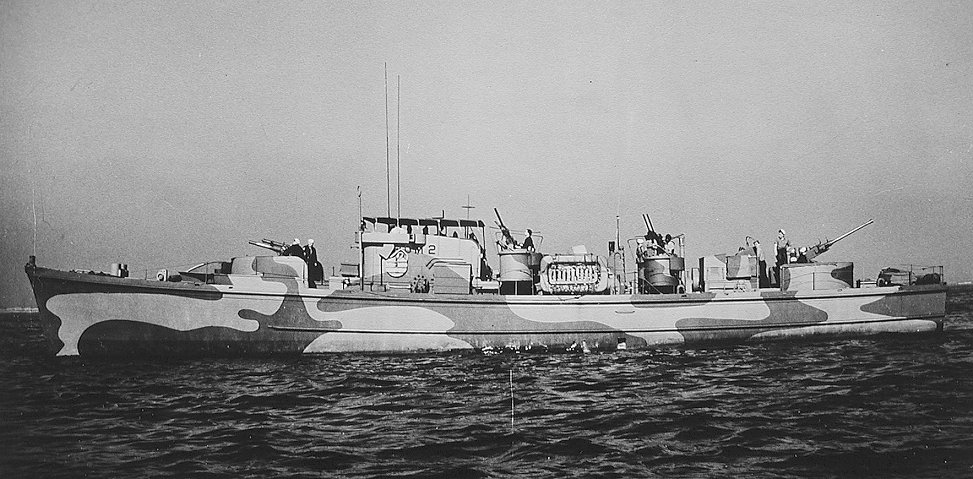
- USS PGM-2, a similar PGM-1 class motor gunboat

History

United States
- Builder: Wilmington Boat Works
- Laid down: 2 November 1942
- Launched: 1 May 1943
- Commissioned: 12 August 1943
- Renamed: 10 December 1943
- Reclassified: 10 December 1943
- Fate: Unknown

General characteristics
- Displacement: 95 tons
- Length: 110 feet 10 inches
- Beam: 23
- Height: 10 feet 10 inches
- Propulsion: 2 × 1,540bhp Electro-Motive Corp. 16-184A diesel engines; 2 × shafts
- Speed: 21 knots
- Complement: 28
- Armament: 1 × 3 in (76 mm) gun mount; 1 × 40 mm gun mounts; 6 × 20 mm guns; 4 × twin .50 cal (12.7 mm) machine gun; 1 × 60mm mortar

USS PGM-8 was a PGM-1 class motor gunboat that served in the United States Navy during World War II. She was originally laid down as a SC-497 class submarine chaser on 2 November 1942 by the Wilmington Boat Works in Wilmington, California and launched on 1 May 1943. She was commissioned as USS SC-1366 on 12 August 1943. She was later converted to a PGM-1 class motor gunboat and renamed PGM-8 on 10 December 1943. After the war she was transferred to the Foreign Liquidations Commission in May 1947. Her exact fate is unknown.

== En Route to the Treasury Islands in the South Pacific ==
23 January 1944 at 1200 hours, USS PGM-8 departed San Pedro, California, headed for Pearl Harbor, Territory of Hawaii, in company of PGM’s 1, 2, 3, 4, 5, 6 and 7, and USS Armadillo (IX-111). The Armadillo provided fuel and water for the PGM’s on the way to Hawaii. These small ships traversed the Pacific Ocean under their own power, en route to their duty station in the Solomon Islands. Along the way, five of the PGMs dropped out of the lead convoy for various reasons.

PGM-8's log indicates that the convoy was underway for Pearl Harbor in obedience to Commander Task Group 14.2 movement order #13-44 of 22 January 1944 as task unit 14.2.5, PGM-8 OTC (officer in tactical command). Just hours after leaving San Pedro, the convoy was in heavy seas. The deck log of USS PGM-2 contains the following entries for 23 January 1944: 1800 wind force 5, sea rough 2100 wind increased to force 7 sea extremely rough. On 25 January the PGM-8 log contains this entry: "1120 USS PGM-2 reported taking water through seams in forward compartment, and that water was coming in faster than pumps could handle it, and requested permission to return to San Pedro, California, with another ship to stand by. 1130 on orders from this vessel, USS PGM-2 and USS PGM-4 left formation and set course to return to San Pedro." The remaining ships of the convoy continued on to Hawaii. February 1, 1254 hours, PGM-8 moored port side to USS PC 586 at Berth S-19, Pearl Harbor.

PGM-8 log contains the following entries for February 12, 1944: "1115 underway for Tutuila, Samoa, pursuant to orders of Commander Task Force 16 Operational order 40-44, Airmailgram 112330 of February 1044. Designated task unit 16.16.8. In company with USS PGM's 1, 3, 5, 7. This vessel C.T.U. 1209 took departure." At the time of departure, USS PGM-6 was in dry dock at Pearl Harbor. It remained behind waiting for PGM’s 2 and 4 to arrive from San Pedro, after repairs to the hull of PGM-2.

PGM-8 arrived at Palmyra Island on 15 February, mooring at the fuel dock in the harbor at 1125 hours. The ship took on 3561 gallons of fuel and departed on 16 February for Tutuila, Samoa in company with PGM's 1, 3, 5 and 7. 20 February, PGM-8 moored to Base Office Dock, Pago Pago Harbor, Tutuila, Samoa. While in Pago Pago harbor, the ship took on 3975 gallons of fuel. On 24 February at 1040 hours the ship departed Tutuila, underway for Suva, Fiji Islands, pursuant to orders of Port Director, Tutuila, Samoa serial no. 648. Designated task unit 16.16.8, in company with USS PGM’s 1, 3, 5, 7., PGM-8 was designated C.T.U.

On 26 February the ship crossed the 180 degree meridian at 1229 hours and the ship’s log date was forwarded to 27 February. On this day, at 1934 hours, PGM-8 moored port side to King’s wharf, Suva Harbor, Fiji Islands. The next day the ship was underway at 1715 hours for Nouméa, New Caledonia, pursuant to orders of Port Director, Suva, Fiji dated 25 February 1944. The ship was in company with USS PGM’s 3, 5, 7. Designated as task unit 16.16.8, PGM-8 was C.T.U. USS PGM-1 remained at Suva and continued on to Nouméa on 5 March.

At 1510 hours on 2 March, PGM-8 moored to a buoy in Fisherman’s Bay, Nouméa, New Caledonia. Nineteen members of the crew were sent ashore on 8 March for 3 days of anti-aircraft training. While at Nouméa, the ship took on 3600 gallons of fuel. At 1418 hours on 12 March, the ship was underway for Espiritu Santo, New Hebrides pursuant to orders of Com 3rd Fleet, dated 11 March 1944 (Dispatch 110103). In company with USS PGM’s 3, 5, 7, PGM-8 was OTC. 14 March 0926 hours, the ship moored port side to USS SC 727, berth 1, Espiritu Santo, New Hebrides. The ship took on 1700 gallons fuel and on 15 March at 1208 hours was underway in company with USS PGM’s 5 & 7, for Guadalcanal, Solomon Islands. PGM-8 was O.T.C. The ship anchored at Guadalcanal 17 March 1025 hours. PGM-3 remained at Espiritu Santo due to engine troubles.

During the period of 17 to 27 March, PGM-8 remained in the vicinity of the MTB Base at Tulagi, and Purvis Bay, Florida Islands, Solomon Islands. At 0615 hours on 27 March, the ship was underway for MTB Base 11, Rendova, New Georgia, Solomon Islands. The ship was in company with USS PGM’s 5 and 7 pursuant to CTF 31 secret dispatch 251302 and anchored in Rendova Harbor at 1935 hours.

PGM-8 was stationed at Rendova between 27 March – 15 April 1944. During this period, the ship participated in various exercises (anti-aircraft firing, night torpedo attack and illumination, shore bombardment, simulated barge hunting). These exercises were conducted with the participation of PGM’s, PT boats and PBY planes.

PGM-8 departed MTB Base 11, Rendova, at 0707 hours on 15 April, underway for Treasury Islands pursuant to orders of ComMTBRons SoPac, conf dispatch #140605 of April 1944. The ship anchored in Blanche Harbor, Treasury Islands, at 1715 hours the same day. Motor Torpedo Boat Base 9 at the Treasury Islands served as the home base for PGM-8 for the period 15 April 1944 to 24 February 1945.
