= USS PGM-1 =

American motor gunboat

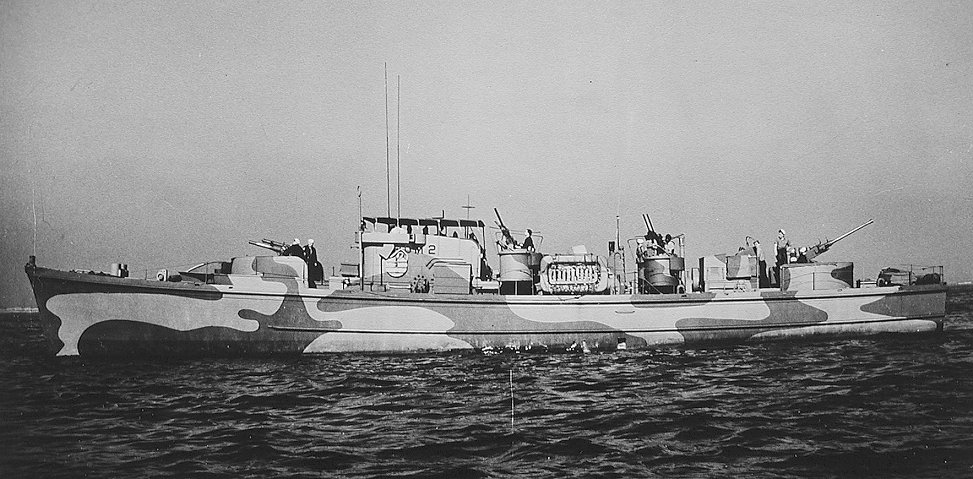
- USS PGM-2, a similar PGM-1 class motor gunboat

History

United States
- Name: PGM-1
- Laid down: 29 November 1941
- Launched: 27 June 1942
- Commissioned: 16 October 1942
- Renamed: 10 December 1943
- Reclassified: 10 December 1943
- Fate: Unknown

General characteristics
- Displacement: 95 tons
- Length: 110 feet 10 inches
- Beam: 23
- Height: 10 feet 10 inches
- Propulsion: 2 × 1,540bhp Electro-Motive Corp. 16-184A diesel engines; 2 × shafts
- Speed: 21 knots
- Complement: 28
- Armament: 1 × 3"/50 dual purpose guns; 2 x 40 mm guns; 6 × 20 mm guns; 1 × twin .50 cal (12.7 mm) machine gun; 1 × 60mm mortar

USS PGM-1 was a PGM-1 class motor gunboat that served in the United States Navy during World War II.

== History ==
She was originally laid down as an SC-497 class submarine chaser on 29 November 1941, by the Peterson Boat Works in Sturgeon Bay, Wisconsin and launched on 27 June 1942. She was commissioned as SC-644 on 16 October 1942.

She was later converted to a PGM-1 class motor gunboat and renamed PGM-1 on 10 December 1943. PGM-1 received one battle star for action in the Northern Solomon Islands on 15 June 1944.

After the war she was transferred to the Foreign Liquidations Commission on 20 May 1947. Her exact fate is unknown.
