= USS Garnet =

Patrol vessel of the United States Navy

Coordinates: 41.946344°N 124.195554°W

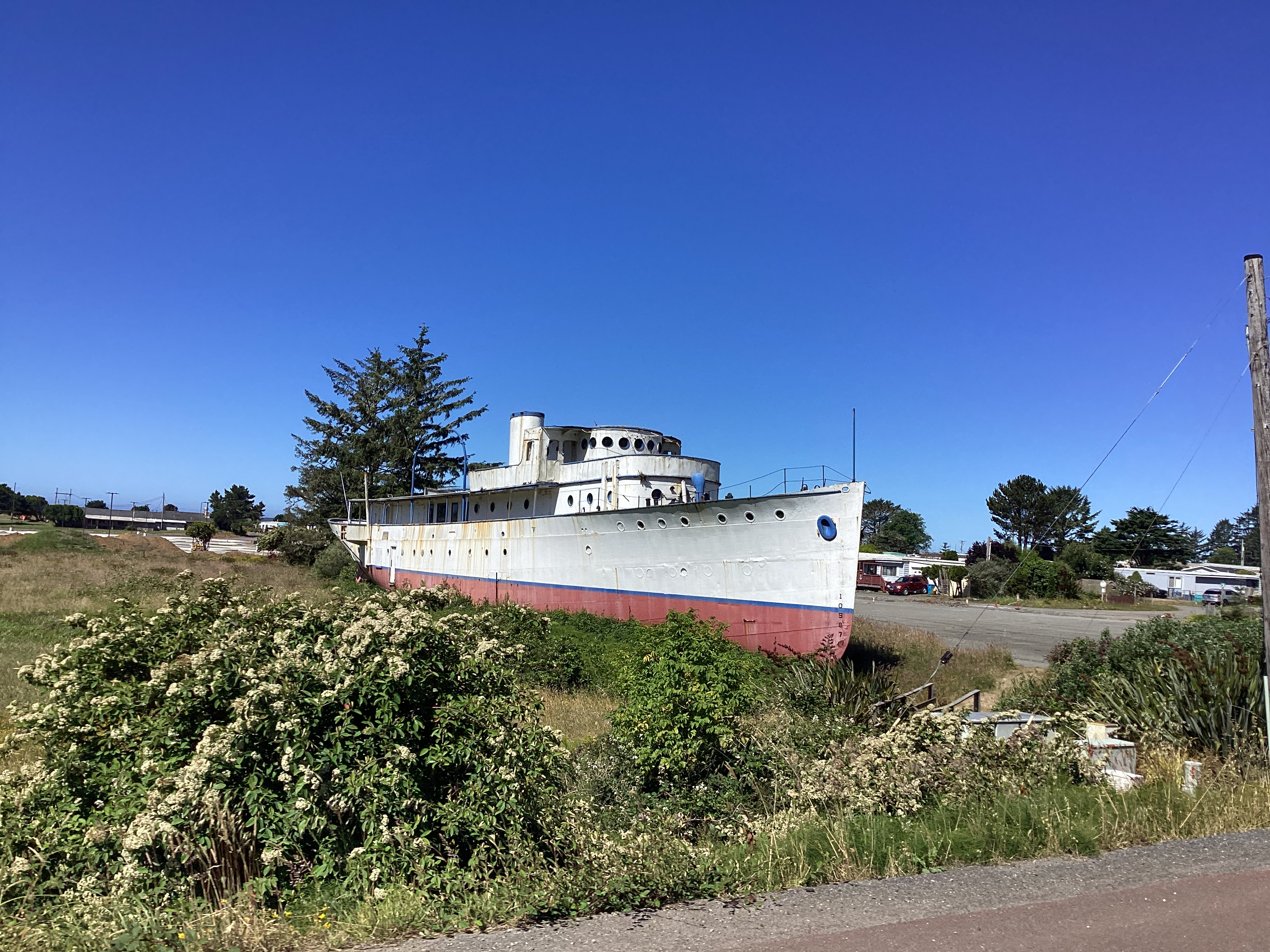
- Garnet as it currently appears in Smith River, California

History

United States
- Name: Caritas
- Owner: J(oseph) Percy Bartram
- Builder: Cox & Stevens – designer; Krupp Iron Works, Kiel, Germany
- Launched: 1925
- Fate: Acquired by the Navy 1 December 1941

History

United States
- Name: Garnet
- Namesake: Garnet
- Acquired: 1 December 1941
- Commissioned: 4 July 1942
- Decommissioned: 29 December 1945
- Stricken: 26 January 1946
- Identification: Hull symbol: PYc-15; Code letters: NBTC
- Fate: Sold, 10 July 1947, to I. W. Landers of Baltimore, Maryland

General characteristics
- Class & type: patrol boat
- Displacement: 490 long tons (500 t)
- Length: 156 ft 9 in (47.78 m)
- Beam: 25 ft 6 in (7.77 m)
- Draft: 9 ft 5 in (2.87 m)
- Installed power: 2 × Union L-8 diesel engine; 1,280 shp (950 kW)
- Propulsion: 2 × screws
- Speed: 12 kn (14 mph; 22 km/h)
- Complement: 50
- Armament: 1 × 3 in (76 mm)/50 caliber gun; 4 × .5 in (13 mm) caliber machine guns; 2 × .30 in (7.6 mm) caliber machine guns; 2 × Depth charge tracks

USS Garnet (PYc-15) is a retired coastal patrol yacht in the service of the United States Navy.

Garnet (PYc-15), formerly steel diesel yacht Caritas, was built in 1925, by Krupp Iron Works, Kiel, Germany; purchased 1 December 1941, from Mr. J. Percy Bartram of New York; converted to a coastal patrol yacht by Robert Jacobs Co., Inc., New York; commissioned 4 July 1942.

== World War II Service ==
Garnet departed New York 21 July 1942, for brief operations in Chesapeake Bay. After shakedown off Key West and Miami, Florida, she steamed via the Bahamas and the Panama Canal to San Diego, California, arriving 22 September. After coastal patrol off southern California, she departed San Diego, 2 December, for the Hawaiian Islands, arriving Pearl Harbor 15 December.

Except for an escort mission to Funafuti, Ellice Islands, in November 1943, Garnet spent the remainder of World War II on convoy escort and patrol duty between Pearl Harbor and Midway.

She returned to San Pedro, 15 November, and decommissioned there 29 December 1945. She was delivered to the United States Maritime Commission for disposal 20 February 1947, and was sold 10 June, to Mr. I. W. Lambert, Baltimore, Md.

== Post-war ==
After the war Caritas was decommissioned 29 December 1945, at San Pedro, and taken to her current location at Smith River, California, as a roadside attraction and gift shop for the Best Western Ship Ashore Motel, now the independent Ship Ashore Resort.
