= USS Cymophane =

Gunboat of the United States Navy

History

United States
- Name: USS Cymophane
- Ordered: as the yacht Robador
- Laid down: date unknown
- Launched: 1926
- Acquired: 2 March 1942
- Commissioned: 6 August 1942
- Decommissioned: 23 August 1944
- In service: 21 September 1944
- Out of service: 23 May 1946
- Stricken: 10 June 1948
- Fate: Sold in 1952

General characteristics
- Type: Yacht
- Displacement: 523 long tons (531 t) (full load)
- Length: 161 ft (49 m)
- Beam: 26 ft (7.9 m)
- Draft: 9 ft 9 in (2.97 m)
- Installed power: 1,800 bhp (1,300 kW)
- Propulsion: 2 × Winton 121 diesel engines; 2 × shafts
- Speed: 14 kn (16 mph; 26 km/h)
- Complement: 49
- Armament: 1 × 3 in (76 mm)/50 cal dual purpose gun, 2 × .50 in (13 mm) machine guns

USS Cymophane (PYc-26) was a Cymophane-class patrol yacht acquired by the United States Navy early during World War II. She was used for patrol, escort, anti-submarine, and rescue operations along coastal waters.

Cymophane was built in 1926 as Sea Forth by Newport News Shipbuilding and Dry Dock Co., Newport News, Virginia; acquired by the Navy on 2 March 1942; and commissioned on 6 August 1942.

== World War II ==
Departing Sturgeon Bay, Wisconsin on 9 August 1942 after the completion of her conversion, Cymophane in company with two motor minesweepers sailed by way of Cleveland, Ohio, and the St. Lawrence River to Nova Scotia where she joined a convoy and sailed on 26 August for New York City, arriving on 2 September. She served at New York under the 3rd Naval District.

=== Reassigned to the 5th Naval District ===
Reassigned to the 5th Naval District, Cymophane arrived at Norfolk, Virginia on 21 November 1942. She served in anti-submarine patrol, convoy escort duty along the U.S. East Coast, and rescue operations until 6 August 1944, when she proceeded to Philadelphia Navy Yard, where she was decommissioned on 25 August.

=== In-service operations ===
After overhaul, she was placed in service on 21 September, and on 2 October departed for New London, Connecticut, arriving on the 4th. Attached to the Underwater Sound Laboratory she alternated experimental work with submarine training until 30 April 1946.

== Post-war decommissioning ==
She arrived at Brooklyn Navy Yard 10 May, and was placed out of service 23 May 1946. She was transferred to the Maritime Commission on 10 June 1948. Sold in 1952 to Visitor, Inc. of New York, New York and renamed Seaforth, she was dismantled in 1956.
