= USS Topaz =

Patrol vessel of the United States Navy

History

United States
- Name: Topaz
- Namesake: Topaz
- Builder: Luders Marine Construction Company, Stamford, Connecticut
- Laid down: 1931
- Acquired: 14 February 1941
- Commissioned: 14 July 1941
- Decommissioned: 27 September 1944
- Stricken: 14 October 1944
- Identification: Hull symbol: PYc-10; Code letters: NBPM
- Fate: Transferred to the War Shipping Administration for disposal in September 1945

General characteristics
- Class & type: Patrol boat
- Displacement: 160 long tons (160 t)
- Length: 111 ft 8 in (34.04 m)
- Beam: 18 ft 11 in (5.77 m)
- Draft: 7 ft (2.1 m) (mean)
- Installed power: 2 × Winton diesel engine; 1,200 bhp (890 kW)
- Propulsion: 2 × screws
- Speed: 13 kn (15 mph; 24 km/h)
- Armament: 1 × 3 in (76 mm)/50 caliber gun; 2 × .30 in (7.6 mm) caliber machine guns; 2 × Depth charge tracks

USS Topaz (PYc-10) was a coastal patrol yacht in the service of the United States Navy. She was named for the gemstone Topaz.

Doromar, a yacht built in 1931, by the Luders Marine Construction Co., Stamford, Connecticut, was acquired by the Navy on 14 February 1941, from Mr. W. McCullough; renamed Topaz and designated PYc-10 on 3 March 1941; converted to a coastal patrol yacht by Robert Jacob, Inc.; and placed in commission at New York on 14 July 1941.

== Pre-War service ==
Topaz cleared New York on 21 July, and headed south. She stopped at Norfolk, Virginia, from 25 July to 5 August, and then continued on to Charleston, South Carolina, where she arrived on 7 August. Three days later, she steamed on to Miami, whence she departed on 15 August. After a two-day visit to Guantanamo Bay, Cuba, the coastal patrol yacht headed for Cristobal, Colon, in the Panama Canal Zone. She arrived in the Canal Zone on 22 August 1941, and reported for duty to the Commandant, 15th Naval District.

== World War II service and decommission ==
For the next three years, Topaz patrolled the close approaches to the Panama Canal and the coastlines of the Canal Zone. On 12 August 1944, she departed the 15th Naval District and the Canal Zone. After stopping at Guantanamo Bay and Charleston, she reached Philadelphia, Pennsylvania, on 31 August 1944. She was placed out of commission there on 27 September, and was turned over to the War Shipping Administration for disposal. Her name was struck from the Navy list on 14 October 1944.
