= USS Felicia (PYc-35) =

Patrol vessel of the United States Navy

History

United States
- Name: USS Felicia (PYc-35)
- Owner: Senator Jesse H. Metcalf of Rhode Island
- Builder: Bath Iron Works, Bath, Maine
- Laid down: 30 March 1931
- Launched: 1 August 1931
- Christened: as the yacht Felicia
- Completed: 14 September 1931
- Acquired: 8 April 1942
- Commissioned: 27 June 1942, as USS Felicia (PYc-35)
- Decommissioned: 10 August 1945
- Stricken: c. 10 August 1945
- Home port: Newport, Rhode Island; Boston, Massachusetts
- Fate: Transferred to the Maritime Commission, 23 October 1945

General characteristics
- Type: Yacht
- Displacement: 447 long tons (454 t) fully loaded
- Length: 147 ft 9 in (45.03 m)
- Beam: 24 ft 10 in (7.57 m)
- Draft: 9 ft 4 in (2.84 m)
- Propulsion: 2 × 660 shp (492 kW) Cooper Bessemer FP-8 diesel engines, two shafts
- Speed: 12 knots (22 km/h; 14 mph)
- Complement: 42 officers and enlisted
- Armament: 1 × 20 mm AA gun

USS Felicia (PYc-35) was a yacht acquired by the United States Navy during World War II. Felicia was outfitted as a patrol craft by the Navy, and was assigned to patrol the New England waters. She was based out of Newport, Rhode Island until 16 December 1943 when she was based out of Boston, Massachusetts, as a training ship for naval cadets at Harvard University. Post-war she was decommissioned and transferred to the Maritime Commission.

== Built by Bath Iron Works in Maine ==
The second ship to be so named by the U.S. Navy, Felicia (PYC-35) was built in 1931 by Bath Iron Works, Bath, Maine; purchased by the Navy on 8 April 1942; and commissioned on 27 June 1942.

== World War II service ==
=== Patrol Craft operations ===
Felicia was assigned to the 2nd Naval District and was based at Newport, Rhode Island, out of which she sailed on anti-submarine patrols, until 16 December 1943.

=== Assigned as a training ship ===
From that time, she operated locally out of Boston, Massachusetts, harbor as a school ship, training student naval officers enrolled at Harvard University.

== Post-war decommissioning and disposal ==
She was decommissioned on 10 August 1945, and transferred to the Maritime Commission on 23 October 1945.
