= USS Grinnell =

Patrol vessel of the United States Navy

History

United States
- Name: USS PC-1230
- Builder: Leathem D. Smith Shipbuilding Company; Sturgeon Bay, Wisconsin
- Laid down: 20 December 1942
- Launched: 10 March 1943
- Commissioned: 12 July 1943
- Decommissioned: March 1946
- Reclassified: 20 August 1945, PCC-1230
- Fate: Pacific Reserve Fleet, 15 February 1956

General characteristics
- Class & type: Submarine Chaser
- Displacement: 280 t. (lt), 450 t. (fl)
- Length: 173 ft (53 m)
- Beam: 23ft.
- Draft: 10ft. 10in.
- Propulsion: 2 x 2,880bhp General Motors 16-258S diesel engines
- Speed: 20.2 kts
- Complement: 65
- Armament: 1 × 3 in (76 mm)/50 cal; 1 × 40 mm gun; 3 × 20 mm cannons; 2 × rocket launchers; 4 × depth charge throwers; 2 × depth charge tracks

USS PC-1230 was a Patrol Craft, laid down in 1942, which participated in escort and convoy missions in the Pacific in World War II, as well as harbor control duties during the Battle of Peleliu.

== Career ==
Laid down, 20 December 1942 at Leathem D. Smith Shipbuilding Company, Sturgeon Bay, Wisc; Launched, 10 March 1943; Commissioned USS PC-1230, 12 July 1943; Reclassified as a Control Submarine Chaser, PCC-1230, 20 August 1945; Decommissioned in March 1946; Laid up in the Pacific Reserve Fleet; Named Grinnell 15 February 1956; Sold in 1960's to the Western Milling Company; Resold in 1970 to the National Metals and Steel Company of Terminal Island, California; Sold in April 1971 to L. Ron Hubbard's Church of Scientology; Renamed Bolivar; Renamed Grinnell.

== Specifications ==
Displacement 280 t. (lt), 450 t. (fl); Length 173' 8"; Beam 23'; Draft 10' 10"; Speed 20.2 kts.; Complement 65; Armament one 3"/50 dual-purpose gun mount, one single 40 mm gun mount; three 20 mm guns, two rocket launchers, four depth charge projectiles, two depth charge tracks; Propulsion two 2,880 bhp General Motors 16-258S diesel engines (Serial No. 10869 & 10872), Farrel-Birmingham single reduction gear, two shafts.

== Service ==
The PC-1230 was launched at the Leathem D. Smith Shipbuilding Company yard in Sturgeon Bay, Wisconsin on Sunday, 10 March 1943.

Their first mission was to escort a commercial tug towing a floating machine shop to the Advanced Naval Base at Bora-Bora in the Society Islands, arriving 13 February 1944.

In the Society Islands they were assigned to an escort and convoy duty in the South Pacific. This duty took them to Espiritu Santo in the New Hebrides, Bougainville, Tulagi and Guadalcanal in the Solomon's. In the Marshall Islands they made landfall at Eniwetok and Kwajalein. In the Philippines, it was at Leyte and Manila.

In the Palaus Islands, during the invasion of Peleliu, they had harbor control duties and supplied firepower for the troops ashore.

After Peleliu was secured, attention was focused on the main island of the Palau Island Group, Babelthaup, where it was reported that over 25,000 Japanese troops were bypassed and contained for the duration of the war. For the next six months their mission was escort, Air/Sea rescue service and patrol duty around the islands and the Kossol Reef anchorage.

Returning to Eniwetok in the Marshall Islands, they were assigned more escort duty before departing for Pearl Harbor and conversion to the PCC-1230 (Landing Control Ship). After overhaul and amphibious training in the Hawaiian Islands they returned to Eniwetok arriving there on 18 June 1945.

Until the end of the war they continued the patrol and escort work between the Marshalls, Marianas and the Philippines. After V-J Day they remained in the Far East where they served as a harbor control ship out of Tokyo Bay. Soon after Japan surrendered, PC-1230 was supposed to Escort the battleship Missouri to Tokyo Bay for the formal surrender. The ship's motor broke down and instead of "escorting the Missouri and thus entering the history books, the PC-1230 limped back to Subic Bay and after repairs, reached Tokyo Bay too late for glory."

Returning to San Francisco via Pearl Harbor, she was decommissioned in March 1946. In January 1947 she was laid up in the Pacific Reserve Fleet.

== Awards ==
- Asiatic-Pacific Campaign Medal with one battle star
- World War II Victory Medal
- Navy Occupation Medal

The PCC-1230 was awarded one battle star for her participation in the Western Caroline Islands Operations: Capture and occupation of the southern Palau Islands – 6 September – 14 October 1944.

== Post-War Activity ==
- 15 February 1956 – While in the Reserve Fleet, she was returned to her original PC designation and was given the name USS Grinnell.
- April 1959 – Sold to private interests
- 1960–1970 – the registered owner of the ex-USS PC-1230 was the Western Milling Company.
- 1970 – Sold to the National Metals and Steel Company of Terminal Island, California.
- April 1971 – The N M & S Company sold her to L. Ron Hubbard's Church of Scientology for use as part of the church's Sea Org, renamed the Bolivar with the California license CF 3871-EM. They painted her white and had davits installed on the port side aft for a whale boat type tender. Through 1976, she was sighted in the San Pedro/Long Beach sections of the Los Angeles Harbor.
- 1980's – Observed moored to the Indies dock on Terminal Island. She was painted gray and had been renamed the Grinnell with California license number CF 9892-LA. No further sightings have been reported.
