= USS PGM-6 =

Gunboat of the United States Navy

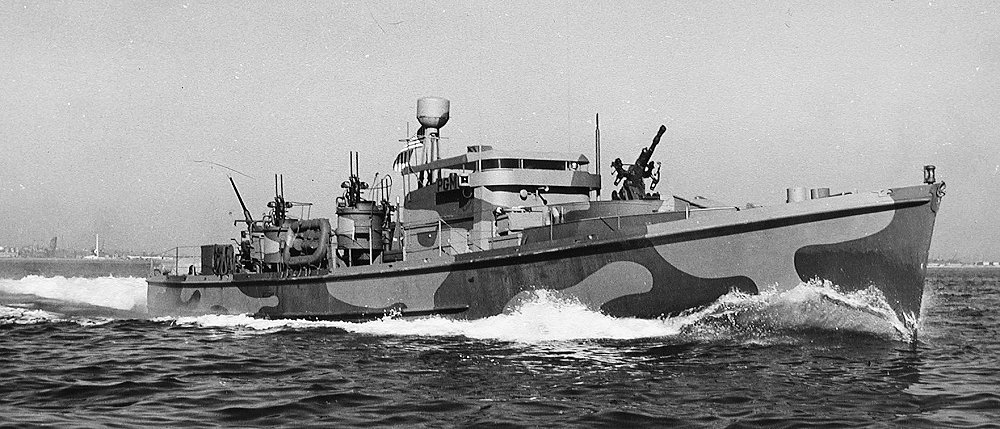
- USS PGM-6 after her conversion

History

United States
- Laid down: 6 February 1943
- Launched: 20 May 1943
- Commissioned: 8 June 1943
- Renamed: 10 December 1943
- Reclassified: 10 December 1943
- Stricken: February 1946
- Fate: Unknown

General characteristics
- Displacement: 95 tons
- Length: 110 feet 10 inches
- Beam: 23
- Height: 10 feet 10 inches
- Propulsion: 2 × 1,540bhp Electro-Motive Corp. 16-184A diesel engines; 2 × shafts
- Speed: 21 knots
- Complement: 28
- Armament: 1 × 3"/23 gun mount; 1 × 40 mm guns; 4 × twin .50 cal (12.7 mm) machine guns

USS PGM-6 was a PGM-1 class motor gunboat that served in the United States Navy during World War II. She was originally laid down as a SC-497 class submarine chaser on 6 February 1943 by the Mathis Yacht Building Company in Camden, New Jersey and launched on 20 May 1943. She was commissioned as USS SC-1071 on 8 June 1943. She was later converted to a PGM-1 class motor gunboat and renamed PGM-6 on 10 December 1943. During the war she took part in the Pacific Theater. After the war she was transferred to the Foreign Liquidations Commission on 7 May 1947. Her exact fate is unknown.
