= USS Truant =

Patrol vessel of the United States Navy

History

United States
- Name: Truant
- Owner: Helen H. Newberry (1892–1938); Henry Ford (1938–1941)
- Builder: Herreshoff Manufacturing Company, Bristol, Rhode Island
- Laid down: 1891
- Launched: 24 August 1892
- Fate: Acquired by the Navy 3 July 1941

History

United States
- Name: Truant
- Namesake: Name retained
- Acquired: 3 July 1941
- Commissioned: 16 July 1941
- Decommissioned: 17 November 1943
- Stricken: 6 December 1943
- Identification: Hull symbol:PYc-14
- Fate: Returned to her owner

General characteristics
- Class & type: patrol boat
- Displacement: 375 long tons (381 t)
- Length: 138 ft (42 m)
- Beam: 17 ft 4 in (5.28 m)
- Draft: 6 ft 7 in (2.01 m)
- Installed power: 600 shp (450 kW)
- Propulsion: 1 × 3-cylinder triple expansion steam engines; 1 × screws
- Speed: 10 kn (12 mph; 19 km/h)
- Complement: 98
- Armament: 2 × 3 in (76 mm)/50 caliber gun

USS Truant (PYc-14) was a coastal patrol yacht in the service of the United States Navy.

In the years following the outbreak of World War II in Europe, during which international tension also worsened in the Far East, the United States Navy augmented the Fleet to meet the growing threat. It also sought yachts, trawlers, and other suitable ships in which to train the officers and men needed by newly constructed warships.

On 3 July 1941, as a part of the latter program, the Navy chartered, on a bare-boat basis, Truant, a steel-hulled steam yacht built in 1892, at Bristol, Rhode Island, by the Herreshoff Manufacturing Company. Henry Ford had purchased the ship in 1938, and had her extensively refitted. When he offered the yacht for the duration of the emergency, the Navy agreed to his request that she be allowed to retain her name during her Navy service. The ship was classified a coastal yacht and designated PYc-14, assigned to the 9th Naval District on 11 July, and commissioned on 16 July 1941, at the Great Lakes Naval Training Station, North Chicago, Illinois.

== World War II service ==
Truant plied the waters of Lake Michigan on training cruises until mid-September; then headed for Dearborn, Michigan, where she arrived on 20 September 1941. She remained there in winter quarters near the Ford Motor Company plant until the early spring of 1942, when she resumed her training cruises. On board this slim, graceful craft, officers and men of the growing and expanding Navy received schooling in basic gunnery and seamanship, which prepared them to serve on fighting ships in the war zones of the Pacific, the Atlantic, and the Mediterranean. With the onset of winter in 1942, she again tied up at her "winter quarters" at the Ford Motor Company plant at South Chicago, Ill., for the cold months and remained there into the spring of 1943.

The yacht then engaged in training exercises and maneuvers in Lake Michigan into November. On 17 November 1943, Truant was decommissioned at the Ford Motor Company plant at Dearborn and returned to her owner. On 6 December 1943, her name was struck from the Navy list.
