= USS SC-1316 =

History

United States
- Name: USS SC-1316
- Builder: Unknown, Nyack, New York
- Laid down: As USS SC-1316
- Launched: 1943
- Renamed: Helen E.
- Fate: Grounded, 5 March 1951
- Notes: Converted to a fishing vessel based in Coos Bay, Oregon, before 1951 grounding.

General characteristics
- Class & type: SC-497-class submarine chaser
- Length: 110 ft 10 in (33.78 m)
- Beam: 17 ft 11 in (5.46 m)
- Draft: 6 ft 6 in (1.98 m) full load

USS SC-1316 was a 110-foot submarine chaser in the United States Navy during World War II.

The vessel was constructed and launched in 1943 in Nyack, New York. SC-1316 later was converted to a fishing vessel and renamed Helen E.

Helen E. was operated out of Coos Bay, Oregon, before it was grounded at Horsfall Beach near its home port. Someone burned the vessel after crews were unable to salvage Helen E.
