= USS SC-497 =

- USS PC-497 before her conversion into USS SC-497.

History

United States
- Name: USS SC-497
- Operator: United States Navy
- Builder: Westergard Boat Works, Inc.
- Laid down: 7 March 1941
- Launched: 4 July 1941
- Commissioned: 15 April 1942
- Fate: Transferred to France on 18 March 1944, permanently on 15 August 1944.

France
- Name: CH-96
- Operator: Free French Naval Forces; French Navy
- Acquired: 18 March 1944
- Renamed: CH-724 in 1952 and later P-724
- Fate: Withdrawn from service on 23 October 1980, fate unknown.

General characteristics
- Class & type: SC-497 class submarine chaser
- Type: submarine chaser
- Displacement: 148 tons
- Length: 110 ft 10 in (34 m)
- Beam: 17 ft (5 m)
- Draft: 6 ft 6 in (2 m)
- Propulsion: 2 × 880bhp General Motors 8-268A diesel engines, Snow and Knobstedt single reduction gear; 2 × shafts
- Speed: 15.6 knots
- Complement: 28
- Armament: 1 × 40 mm gun mount; 2 × .50 cal (12.7 mm) caliber machine guns; 2 × Y-guns; 2 × ducts

USS SC-497 was a SC-497 class submarine chaser that served in the United States Navy and later the Free French Navy during World War II. She was originally laid down as PC-497 on 29 November 1941 by the Westergard Boat Works in Rockport, Texas, and launched on 4 July 1941. She was commissioned as USS PC-497 on 16 October 1942. She was later reclassified as a SC-497 class submarine chaser and renamed SC-497. She was transferred to the Free French Navy as part of the Lend-Lease program on 18 March 1944 as CH-96. The transfer was made permanent on 15 August 1944. She was renamed CH-724 in 1952 and later P-724 before being withdrawn from service on 23 October 1980. Her exact fate is unknown.

== See also ==
- Harbour Defence Motor Launch
- Wooden boats of World War II
