= USS Beaufort (PCS-1387) =

PCS-1376-class submarine chaser

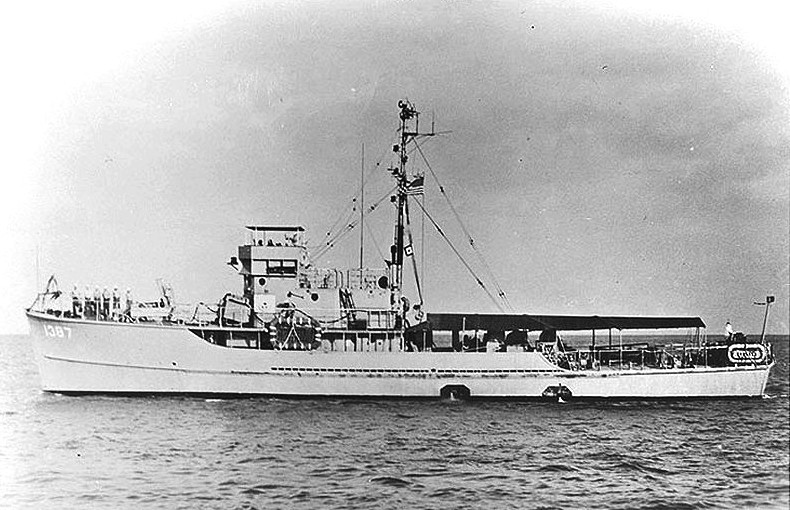
- USS Beaufort (PCS-1387)

History

United States
- Name: Beaufort
- Namesake: City of Beaufort, South Carolina
- Builder: Wheeler Shipbuilding Corp., Whitestone, Long Island, New York
- Laid down: 22 May 1943
- Launched: 10 October 1944
- Sponsored by: Miss Barbara C. Dietz
- Commissioned: 27 November 1944 as USS PCS-1387
- Decommissioned: 26 March 1956
- In service: as a U.S. Naval Reserve training ship (date not known)
- Renamed: Beaufort 15 February 1956
- Stricken: 15 July 1967
- Fate: used as a target by Naval Weapons Laboratory, Dahlgren, Virginia; later sold in July 1972

General characteristics
- Class & type: PCS-1376-class minesweeper
- Displacement: 245 tons
- Length: 136 ft (41 m)
- Beam: 24 ft 6 in (7.47 m)
- Draft: 8 ft 7 in (2.62 m)
- Propulsion: two 800bhp General Motors 8-268A diesel engines, Snow and Knobstedt single reduction gear, two shafts.
- Speed: 14.1 knots
- Complement: 57 officers and enlisted
- Armament: 1 x 3"/50 dual purpose mount; 1 x 40mm gun; 2 x 20mm guns; 4 x depth charge projectors; 1 x depth charge projector (hh); 2 x depth charge tracks

USS Beaufort (PCS-1387) – initially known as USS PCS-1387 -- was a PCS-1376-class submarine chaser acquired by the U.S. Navy during World War II. Although constructed and designed as an anti-submarine patrol ship, she was used throughout the war, and afterwards, as a training ship for sonar operators.

== Built at Whitestone, New York ==
The fourth ship to be so named by the Navy, Beaufort (PCS-1387) was laid down on 22 May 1943, at Whitestone, New York; launched on 10 October 1944, as simply PCS-1387; sponsored by Miss Barbara C. Dietz; and commissioned at the New York Navy Yard on 27 November 1944.

== World War II service ==
After fitting out, the subchaser embarked upon her shakedown cruise on 15 December. She conducted that training out of Key West, Florida, between 22 December 1944 and 2 January 1945.

On the latter day, PCS-1387 began duty with the Fleet Sonar School, Key West, Florida, as a training platform for new sonarmen. She also doubled as harbor guard ship at Key West. Such training duties continued past the end of the war, through the late 1940s, and into the 1950s.

The 1950s, however, brought an increase in the extent of her zone of operations for, after that time, she ranged the Atlantic Ocean coast as far north as Narragansett Bay and south into the Caribbean. On 15 February 1956, she was named Beaufort. Just over a month later on 26 March, Beaufort was decommissioned at St. Petersburg, Florida.

== Continued duty as a training ship ==
Her usefulness to the Navy, however, did not end there. She was retained in service for another 11 years under the Commandant, 6th Naval District, as a training ship for naval reservists.

== Designated as a target ship ==
On 15 July 1967, her name was struck from the Navy List, and she was turned over to the Naval Weapons Laboratory, Dahlgren, Virginia, for use as a target. Apparently, she was not totally destroyed because she was sold in July 1972 to Mr. David Hahn of British Honduras.
