= USS SC-498 =

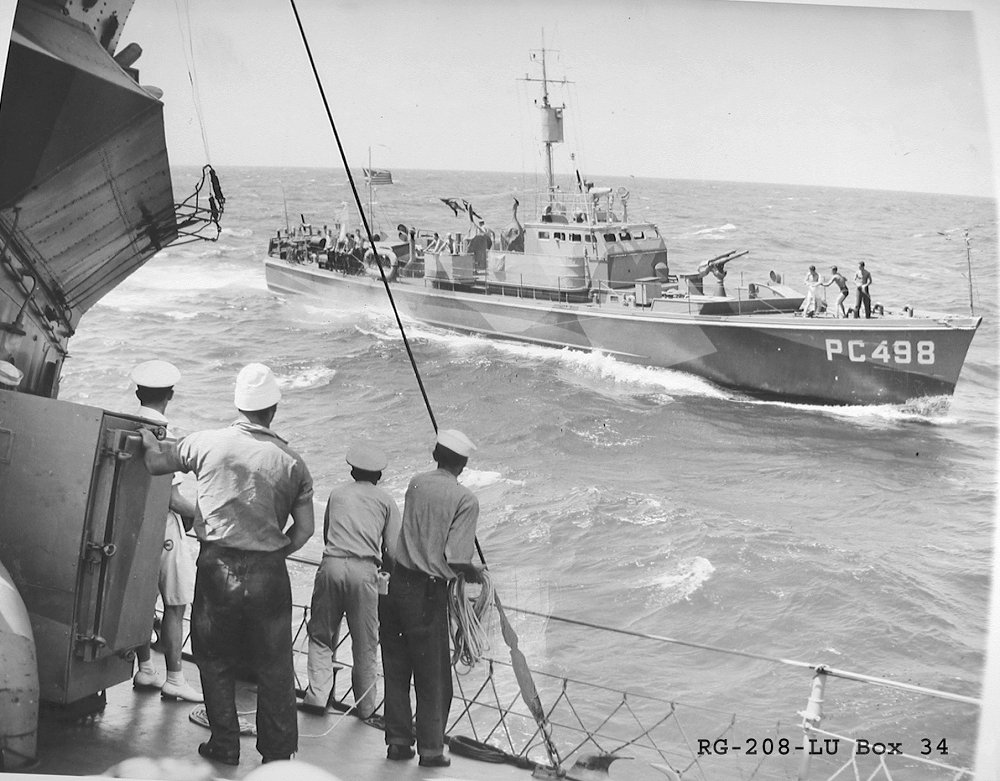
- USS PC-498 before her conversion into USS SC-498.

History

United States
- Name: USS SC-498
- Operator: United States Navy
- Builder: Westergard Boat Works, Inc.
- Laid down: 12 March 1941
- Launched: 21 July 1941
- Commissioned: 29 April 1942
- Fate: Transferred to France on 18 October 1944

France
- Name: CH-142, and later P-696
- Operator: Free French Naval Forces; French Navy
- Acquired: 18 October 1944
- Fate: Unknown.

General characteristics
- Class & type: SC-497 class submarine chaser
- Type: submarine chaser
- Displacement: 148 tons
- Length: 110 ft 10 in (34 m)
- Beam: 17 ft (5 m)
- Draft: 6 ft 6 in (2 m)
- Propulsion: 2 × 880bhp General Motors 8-268A diesel engines, Snow and Knobstedt single reduction gear; 2 × shafts
- Speed: 15.6 knots
- Complement: 28
- Armament: 1 × 3 in (76 mm) gun mount; 2 × .50 cal (12.7 mm) caliber machine guns; 2 × Y-guns; 2 × ducts

USS SC-498 was a SC-497 class submarine chaser that served in the United States Navy, and later the Free French Navy, during World War II.

She was laid down as PC-498 on 12 March 1941 by the Westergard Boat Works in Rockport, Texas, and launched on 21 July 1941. She was commissioned as USS PC-498 on 29 April 1942. She was later reclassified a SC-497 class submarine chaser and renamed SC-498.

She was transferred to the Free French Navy as part of the Lend-Lease program on 18 March 1944 as CH-142, and was later reclassified as P-696. Her exact fate is unknown.

== See also ==
- Harbour Defence Motor Launch
- Wooden boats of World War II
