= USS Vagrant =

Yacht that served in the United States Navy

History

United States
- Name: Vagrant
- Owner: Harold Stirling Vanderbilt
- Builder: Bath Iron Works
- Laid down: 9 January 1941
- Launched: 24 May 1941
- In service: 13 September 1941

History

United States
- Name: Vagrant
- Owner: United States Navy
- Acquired: 23 March 1942
- Commissioned: 9 May 1942
- In service: 23 March 1942
- Stricken: 1 September 1945

USS Vagrant (PYc-30) was a yacht which served as a patrol craft in the United States Navy during World War II.

== Construction ==
Vagrant, a steel-hulled, single-screw yacht, was laid down on 9 January 1941 at Bath Iron Works in Maine. She was launched on 24 May 1941 and was delivered to her owner, railroad executive, yachtsman and socialite Harold Stirling Vanderbilt, on 13 September 1941.

== US Navy service ==
The US Navy acquired Vagrant on 23 March 1942 for use as a district patrol craft.

Although initially designated as the unnamed YP-258, the yacht was reclassified as a coastal patrol vessel and given the hull number PYc-30 on 2 April 1942. An order dated 8 April 1942, authorized the retention of the name Vagrant. Fitted out at City Island in the Bronx, by the Robert Jacob, Inc. boatyard, Vagrant was commissioned on 9 May 1942.

After shakedown out of New London, Connecticut and Boston, Massachusetts, Vagrant arrived at Newport, R.I., on 11 August 1942 for special duty under the orders of the Commander, Eastern Sea Frontier. Successively transferred to the 1st and 3d Naval Districts for local operations in a patrol and training capacity, Vagrant was decommissioned and placed "in service" on 29 December 1943. She performed training duties with the 3d Naval District for the remainder of the war.

On 30 May 1945, the Commandant of the 3rd Naval District, authorized Vagrant to be inactivated, preparatory to her turnover to the War Shipping Administration (WSA). Placed "out of service" and laid up on 6 August, Vagrant was struck from the Navy list on 1 September and transferred to the WSA on 14 December.

== Post war ==
After return to her pre-war owner, Harold S. Vanderbilt, Vagrant changed hands in about 1949 when she was acquired by Ralph C. Allen of Oyster Bay, New York. Subsequently, picked up by the Orion Shipping and Trading Co., Vagrant remained on the Lloyd's Register of Yachts until 1947, when her named disappeared from the lists. She was known to be operating under the Liberian flag in 1955. Her history after that date is uncertain.

In 1977, the ship allegedly stranded on the island of Gran Canaria. It was later acquired by João Bartolomeu Faria, who brought it to the island of Madeira in 1979. Despite initially only wanting to restore it so that it could be used to sail again, Faria ended up transforming the vessel into a restaurant, removing it from the sea, and jointly creating a mini marina serving as part of the restoration complex.

With the storm of February 20, 2010, the Regional Government of Madeira decided to renovate the entire area surrounding the vessel in order to create more green spaces, making it impossible for Vagrant to continue in the place where it was located. Despite the owner's objections, the Madeiran authorities managed to remove the boat, which was stabilized on land. After re-entering the water, the boat was towed to the port of Caniçal, with the aim of later being sunk and transformed into an artificial reef off the coast of Madeira.

In December 2013, with a storm that hit the south coast of Madeira, the yacht ended up sinking in Caniçal Bay and has remained there ever since.

== Awards ==
- American Campaign Medal
- World War II Victory Medal
