= USS PGM-11 =

Gunboat of the United States Navy

History

United States
- Name: PGM-11
- Builder: Commercial Iron Works
- Laid down: 27 September 1943
- Launched: 30 October 1943
- Commissioned: 13 December 1944
- Identification: PGM-11
- Fate: Transferred to the State Department, Foreign Liquidation Commission in October 1948

General characteristics
- Type: PGM-9-class motor gunboat
- Displacement: 280 tons (light); 450 tons (full)
- Length: 173 ft 8 in (52.93 m)
- Beam: 23 ft (7.0 m)
- Draft: 10 ft 10 in (3.30 m)
- Propulsion: 2 x 1,280 bhp (950 kW) Hooven-Owen-Rentschler RB-99 DA diesel engines
- Speed: 19 kn (35 km/h; 22 mph)
- Complement: 65
- Armament: 1 × 3"/50 dual purpose gun; 1 x twin 40 mm gun mount; 6 × 20 mm guns; 4 x twin .50 cal (12.7 mm) heavy machine guns

USS PGM-11 was a PGM-9-class motor gunboat in service with the United States Navy during World War II.

== Ship history ==
The ship was ordered on 27 February 1942, and laid down on 27 September 1943, as PC-806 by the Commercial Iron Works in Portland, Oregon. Launched on 30 October 1943, she was reclassified as PGM-11 in August 1944. She was commissioned into naval service on 13 December 1944, with Lieutenant E. H. George, USNR, in command. She was active in the Pacific theater, primarily accompanying minesweepers in and around the Philippines. On 14 April 1945, she was damaged when she ran aground off of Kerama Retto, southwest of Okinawa. She was later refloated and repaired.

On 6 April 1945, PGM-11 assisted in the evacuation of the stricken converted minesweeper USS Emmons during an attack by the Japanese off Okinawa.

She was transferred to the State Department, Foreign Liquidation Commission in October 1948. Her fate is unknown.
