= USS PGM-3 =

Gunboat of the United States Navy

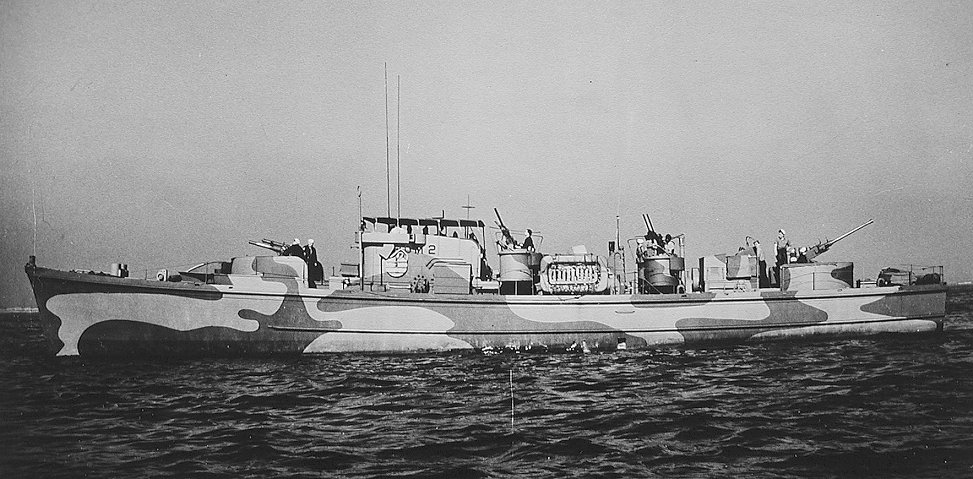
- USS PGM-2, a similar PGM-1 motor gunboat

History

United States
- Name: PGM-3
- Laid down: 7 September 1942
- Launched: 12 April 1943
- Commissioned: 17 May 1943
- Renamed: 10 December 1943
- Reclassified: 10 December 1943
- Fate: Unknown

General characteristics
- Displacement: 95 tons
- Length: 110 feet 10 inches
- Beam: 23
- Height: 10 feet 10 inches
- Propulsion: 2 × 1,540bhp Electro-Motive Corp. 16-184A diesel engines; 2 × shafts
- Speed: 21 knots
- Complement: 28
- Armament: 1 × 3"/50 dual purpose guns; 2 x 40 mm guns; 6 × 20 mm guns; 1 × twin .50 cal (12.7 mm) machine guns; 1 × 60mm mortar

USS PGM-3 was a PGM-1 class motor gunboat that served in the United States Navy during World War II. She was originally laid down as an SC-497 class submarine chaser on 7 September 1942 by the Peterson Boat Works in Sturgeon Bay, Wisconsin and launched on 12 April 1943. She was commissioned as USS SC-1035 on 17 May 1943. She was later converted to a PGM-1 class motor gunboat and renamed PGM-3 on 10 December 1943. After the war she was transferred to the Foreign Liquidations Commission on 20 May 1947. She was turned over to the Chinese Navy at the mouth of the Yangtze River in the summer of 1947.

== Service prior to conversion to PGM ==
- 28 May 43 sailing from U.S. Naval Station, New Orleans, Louisiana to Submarine Chaser Training Center, Miami, Florida
- 29 June 43 sailing from S.C.T.C., Miami, Florida to Nassau, British West Indies
- 5 July 43 sailing from S.C.T.C., Miami, Florida to Key West, Florida
- 9 July 43 sailing from NOB, Key West, Florida to Guantanamo Bay, Cuba
- 28 July 43 sailing from Balboa, Canal Zone to Corinto, Nicaragua
- 31 July 43 sailing from Corinto, Nicaragua to Manzanillo, Mexico
- 5 August 43 sailing from Manzanillo, Mexico to San Diego, California
- 14 August 43 sailing from San Diego, California to San Francisco, California
- 7 September 43 sailing from San Francisco, California to Seattle, Washington
- 13 October 43 sailing from Pier #41, Seattle, Washington to U.S.N. Section Base, Neah Bay, Washington
- 19 November 43 sailing from Seattle, Washington to San Pedro, California

Location	Map link	Location	Map link
New Orleans	29.989°N 90.071°W	Miami	25.794°N 80.225°W
Nassau	25.064°N 77.346°W	Key West	24.558°N 81.782°W
Guantanamo Bay	20.005°N 75.130°W	Balboa	8.949°N 79.566°W
Corinto	12.498°N 87.175°W	Manzanillo	19.056°N 104.286°W
San Diego	32.705°N 117.204°W	San Francisco	37.810°N 122.388°W
Seattle	47.607°N 122.365°W	Neah Bay	48.371°N 124.618°W
San Pedro	33.728°N 118.263°W		

== En route to the Treasury Islands in the South Pacific ==
23 January 1944, USS PGM-3 departed San Pedro, California, headed for Pearl Harbor, Territory of Hawaii, in company of PGMs 1, 2, 4, 5, 6, 7 and 8, and USS Armadillo (IX-111). These small ships traversed the Pacific Ocean under their own power, en route to their duty station in the Solomon Islands. Along the way, five of the PGMs dropped out of the lead convoy for various reasons. PGM-3 was the last ship to drop out. For further details of PGM-3's voyage before reaching Espiritu Santo, see USS PGM-7.

Location	Map link
Lunga Point	9.399°S 160.031°E
Purvis Bay	9.149°S 160.253°E

USS PGM-3 arrived at Espiritu Santo, New Hebrides, on 14 March 1944, in the company of PGM's 5, 7 and 8. The previous day the port engine started smoking and was immediately shut down. Upon arrival at Espiritu Santo, the engine was hoisted aboard the repair ship USS Mindanao (ARG-3) and was installed back in the PGM-3 on 4 April. PGM's 5, 7 and 8 departed Espiritu Santo on 15 March, leaving PGM-3 behind and waiting for the other delayed PGM's of Division One. The overhauled port engine failed again on 6 April during speed trials. By 1 May, the port engine was in working order again and on 6 May the PGM-3 departed Espiritu Santo en route to Guadalcanal, sailing as part of Task Unit 35.1.8 under the unit command of Commander Wait on board the troopship Mormachawk. Arriving at Lunga Point, Guadalcanal, on 9 May, the PGM-3 continued on to Purvis Bay, Florida Islands (known today as Nggela Islands). PGM-3 was stationed at various locations in the Florida Islands until 23 May. The ship's log indicates that PGM's 2, 4 and 6 were moored alongside at various times during this period.

Location	Map link
Motor Torpedo Boat Base 9	7.404°S 155.565°E

On 23 May, PGM-3 departed Tulagi, Florida Islands, en route to Rendova Island, New Georgia Islands, arriving there the next day, and anchoring at the Motor Torpedo Boat Base 11(PT Boat Base 11). During its stay at Rendova, the ship's log indicates that it was moored at times next to PGM's 2, 4 and 6. Then on 7 June, the PGM-3 departed for the Treasury Islands, arriving there the same day. Motor Torpedo Boat Base 9 at the Treasury Islands served as the home base for PGM-3 for the period 7 June 1944 to 24 February 1945.

== Service at Motor Torpedo Base 9, Treasury Islands ==
During the month of June, PGM-3 completed four 2-day patrols of the southeast coast of Bougainville Island and Bougainville Strait, working variously with PGM's 1, 5, 6, 8, USS LCI 61, and a PBY seaplane. These were anti-barge patrols at night and mine patrols during the day. The ship fired upon many coastal locations and destroyed two drifting mines by gunfire.

On 27 June, PGM-3 departed MTB Base 9 in the company of PGM-1, en route to Carter City, Florida Island. After arrival the ship was moored next to PGM-2. The ship underwent repairs and alterations at Carter City, including the installation of sound gear and a 3-inch/50 gun. 26 July, PGM-3 was moored next to PGM-6. PGM-3 returned to MTB Base 9 at the Treasury Islands on 27 July.

Location	Map link
Homestead Lagoon	1.676°S 149.909°E,
Hamburg Bay	1.650°S 149.944°E
Green Islands	4.506°S 154.227°E

PGM-3 participated in three extended anti-barge patrols along the western coast of New Ireland in August and September. 1 August at 0550 hours, the ship departed MTB Base 9 in company of PGM's 1 and 2, and arrived at the patrol location at 0115 hours the next day, where the PGMs worked with a PBY seaplane. 4 August, the ships arrived at MTB Advanced Base, Homestead Lagoon, Emirau Island and took on water and fuel the next day at Hamburg Bay. PGM's 3 and 2 departed Emirau Island on 8 August en route to MTB Base 9, Treasury Islands. 27 August, PGM-3 departed MTB Base 9 in company with PGM's 5 and 8 to patrol area "uncle" on the southwest coast of New Ireland. The PGMs arrived at MTB Base 7, Green Islands on 30 August for a layover, departing on patrol again on 2 September. On this patrol the ships worked with four F4U aircraft and PT boats from the Green Islands and then departed the patrol on the morning of 5 September en route to MTB Base 9. PGM's 3, 5 and 6 departed MBT Base 9 at 0259 hours on 19 September for another anti-barge patrol along the coast of New Ireland, arriving on station at 2353 hours the same day. During the afternoon of 21 September, the ships were patrolling in an area 30 miles northwest of Duke of York Islands and in the evening were patrolling along the west coast of New Ireland again, working with the PBY seaplane, call sign "Charcoal". Charcoal dropped several incendiary bombs in the area of a barge canal at Matakan Plantation, starting several fires that lasted about 10 minutes. At 0047 hours PGM-3 fired a burst of .50 caliber tracers into Matakan Plantation to point out a target to the PBY. Charcoal dropped flares to illuminate targets and the PGMs strafed Matakan Plantation for two miles along the coast. The ships departed the patrol area early in the morning of 22 September and headed for MTB Base 7, Green Islands.

While at the Green Islands, the PGMs received emergency orders to intercept the hospital ship USS Samaritan, which had been damaged by a mine. The hospital ship was acting as formation guide for a convoy that included the following ships: USS Osmus (DE-701), OTC; USS Whitehurst (DE-634); USS Algorma (AT-34); SS Poleau Laut. PGMs 3, 5 and 6 departed the Green Islands at 1437 hours on 24 September, setting a course of 258 degrees true at 1450 hours and then 109 degrees true at 1516 hours, following the latter course until reaching the hospital ship at 1122 hours the next day. The hospital ship was proceeding on a course of 127 degrees true at the time. The PGMs served on scouting lines for the convoy until 1700 hours on 26 September, when they were detached from the mission. The PGMs then proceeded to Tulagi, Florida Islands, reaching their destination the next day. PGM-3 departed Govanna Inlet, Florida Island on 29 September in company of PGM's 5 and 6 and arrived at MTB Base 9, Treasury Islands the next day.

The day following its arrival back at base, PGM-3 headed out again for another patrol of area "uncle" on southwest coast of New Ireland in the company of PGM's 6 and 8. The PGMs arrived on station off Huru Point at 1930 hours on 2 October. A PBY was dropping flares along the coast to illuminate possible targets. In the area of Matakan Plantation, the PBY dropped a bomb close to a hut on the beach and PGM-3 shelled the vicinity of the hut with their 60 mm mortar. At 0106 hours, a PBY illuminated a loaded barge 1500 yards off Huru Point. The PGMs and PT boats arrived on scene 30 minutes later and made runs against the barge. The PTs scored several hits and in the following runs, the PGMs scored hits with their 3-inch/50 and 40 mm guns. The barge was destroyed during the 20-minute attack. After completing their patrol the following night, the PMGs set out on the morning of 5 October for MTB Base 7, Green Islands. After a layover, the PGMs returned to patrol on 9 October. Near the end of the day on 11 October, the PGMs were working with the PBY seaplane, call sign "Tarbaby". At 0500 hours on 12 October, the PGMs finished their patrol off Tambaker Point, arriving back at MTB Base 9 the following day at 0652 hours.

During the latter two weeks of October, PGM-3 was assigned escort duty, making two round trips to Finschhafen, New Guinea, returning alone each time to MTB Base 9. The first round trip spanned the dates 14 October to 19, escorting the merchant ship SS Marmacsea. SS Wilfred Grenfell was escorted on the second round trip, 24 October to 29.

In November and December PGM-3 conducted four patrols of the southwest and southeast coasts of Bougainville Island, Bougainville Strait and the northwest coast of Choiseul Island. One trip was in the company of 2 PT boats (call signs "Gum King" and "Gum 131"), one apparently alone, one in company with PGM-8 and one in company with PGM-2. In addition, the ship made two quick round trips to Cape Torokina, escorting USS General W. F. Hase (AP-146) to the cape on the second trip on 10 December.

PGM-3 departed the base at Treasury Islands for its last patrol along the west coast of New Ireland at 2159 hours on 25 December in the company of PGM-2. The ships arrived at their patrol station the next day at 1932 hours, 2 miles off Huru Point. The PGMs were still patrolling in the second hour of 29 December, working with the Black PBY Catalina, call sign "Charcoal". Charcoal was strafing the beach of the Chinese Plantation and illuminating the area for the PGMs. PGM-3 fired upon the beach with gun number 6 (40 mm). Not long thereafter, the PGMs were abeam of Ulpatur Plantation where Charcoal dropped a flare and four bombs. Early in the morning, the PGMs departed their patrol and set a course to the naval base on Green Island, arriving there at 1520 hours. A layover there ended 1 January 1945, when the ships returned to the patrol area, arriving 5 miles off Huru Point at 2145 hours. At 0615 hours on 4 January, the PGMs departed their patrol at Huru Point, making their way back to base at the Treasury Islands. Near midnight, PGM's 3 and 2 passed PGM's 1 and 5, who were headed in the opposite direction, making their way from base to the same patrol area.

Location	Map link
Kuku Point	6.837°S 156.536°E,
Sangigai	6.962°S 156.691°E

PGM-3's last patrol in the Solomon Islands commenced 16 January and ended the next day. The anti-barge patrol was conducted in area "Queen" along the west coast of Choiseul Island. For this last patrol PGM-3 was once again in the company of PGM-2. Shortly before arriving on station, the PGM-3 sank a drifting mine with gunfire. The next morning at 0625 hours, four F4U Corsairs arrived overhead to participate in bombardment activities at Kuku Point, followed by gunfire into the same area by the PGMs. Continuing on patrol, the PGM-3 shelled a reported enemy concentration in a cave. At 0946 hours the ships arrived at Sangigai, anchored off shore, and commenced unloading supplies for "Australians". The PGMs were underway to their home base at 1204 hours, reaching their destination at 1815 hours.

In February the PGM ships of Division One were wrapping up operations in the Solomon Islands and preparing for advancement to the Philippines. On 2 February the main engines of PGM-3 were hoisted out of the ship for replacement.

== Service in the Philippine Islands ==
Location	Map link
Challenger Bay	2.540°S 140.708°E,
San Pedro Harbor	11.216°N 125.068°E

The ships of PGM Division One, PGM’s 1, 2, 3, 4, 5, 6 and 8, departed the Treasury Islands on 24 February, en route to Hollandia, New Guinea. USS PGM-7, the remaining ship of Division One, was severely damaged in a collision in July of the previous year and never returned to active service. The ships arrived at Hollandia on 28 February and anchored in Challenger Bay. On 3 March the ships departed the harbor and joined a convoy headed for the island of Leyte in the Philippines. PGM-3 took its position astern of USS Anthedon (AS-24). The PGMs served as radar and sound screens, rear guard, and rescue ships for the convoy. The convoy arrived at Leyte on 10 March and the PGMs anchored in San Pedro Harbor. On 13 March the log of PGM-3 indicates that at 1833 hours, the ship was moored next to PGM-4 at Motor Torpedo Boat Base 5 in the San Juanico Strait, Leyte. PGM-3 remained at MTB Base 5 until 7 April.

At 1625 hours on 7 April, PGM-3 was underway from MTB Base 5, following in the wake of PGM-1 through the San Juanico Strait en route to Ormoc Bay, Leyte, and moored at the Ormoc wharf at 0700 hours the next morning. The PGMs departed the following day at 0645 hours en route to Camiguin Island. The ships tied up at the dock at Mambajao, Camiguin, at 1430 hours and were underway again at 1745 hours, headed to their patrol area in Macajalar Bay, Mindanao. The PGMs commenced patrol of the area 1 mile off Salay at 1930 hours, and continued to blockade the Mindanao coast at Macajalar Bay into the morning hours, using radar to search for enemy traffic. At 0645 hours the PGM-3 commenced firing its 3-inch/50 and 40 mm guns at the mouth of Cagayan River. The ships departed the patrol at 0803 hours to return to Camiguin. After an hour-stay at Camiguin, the ships continued on to Iligan, Mindanao. The PGMs were underway from the wharf at Iligan at 1910 hours to return to their patrol area. At 0243 hours, one mile off Tagaloan River, the wake of a putative torpedo was observed to pass just ahead of PGM-3. Another wake passed under PGM-1. On 12 April at 0520 hours, the PGMs departed the patrol area, en route to Balingasag Bay. Guerilla Banca came alongside at 0704 hours to transfer four Japanese prisoners and captured enemy equipment. Afterward, the PGM-3 proceeded en route to Cebu City. At 1813 hours the four Japanese prisoners were transferred to the army stockade at Cebu City for the night. A half hour later the area came under enemy attack with shells exploding close to the PGM-3. All ships in the vicinity proceeded to get underway to avoid the shelling. Shells exploding in vicinity of the dock caused numerous personnel casualties. The PGM-3 sought safety by proceeding to the outer harbor at Cebu where it anchored for the night. On the morning of 13 April, the Japanese prisoners were brought aboard by military police and the ship departed for Ormoc. The ship moored in Ormoc Bay shortly before noon the same day and military police escorted the prisoners ashore. The PGMs departed Ormoc Bay the next day, 14 April, and arrived back at base at 1313 hours.

PGM-3 departed MTB Base 5 for its second patrol in the Philippines on 18 April in company with PGM-1. This patrol was similar to the first, with stops at Ormoc and Mambajao followed by patrols in the area of Macajalar Bay. After the last patrol the ships returned to base via Ormoc, arriving at MTB Base 5 on 25 April.

Location	Map link
Casiguran Sound	16.117°N 121.990°E,
Dingalan Bay	15.340°N 121.402°E
Calabgan Bay	16.214°N 122.074°E
Iloilo River	15.060°N 121.508°E
Gabriel Point	14.799°N 121.624°E
Binangonan Point	14.566°N 121.625°E
Port Real	14.658°N 121.611°E

PGM-3 departed MTB Base 5 on 6 May, proceeding independently to Polillo Island, arriving there at 0812 hours on 8 May. The next day two officers and eleven men of the Philippine Army reported aboard and the ship departed at 0807 hours for patrol off the east coast of Luzon in company with PC-1123. In the hour before noon, PGM-3 fired upon the beach at Binangonan Point. At 1350 hours PGM-3 was closing towards the beach at Infanta to pick up civilian evacuees. PGM-3 and PC 1123 then returned to Polillo Harbor where, presumably, the civilians were set ashore. On the morning of 10 May, the two ships departed Polillo for another patrol of the east coast of Luzon. At 1010 hours the ships commenced a northward sweep at Gabriel Point, firing at an enemy encampment in the vicinity of Iloilo River at 1135 hours. PGM-3 moored alongside PC-1123 in Dingalan Bay at 1410 hours for the purpose of taking on ammunition and the ships then departed for Casiguran Sound. In the early morning hours of 11 May the ships put a guerilla landing party ashore 3 miles south of Calabgan. The ships then departed, arriving back at Polillo Harbor at 1540 hours, and moored to the pier at Polillo City. The two ships departed for another patrol the next morning, arriving back at Binangonan Point at 0725 hours for a northerly sweep of the coast. At 0945 hours PGM-3 commenced firing in the Port Real area and received return machine gun and small arms fire. Two Japanese Q Boats were believed to be destroyed. The patrol was terminated at 1903 hours and the ships returned to Polillo. The next morning the PGM-3 departed Polillo in company with PC-1123, PC-476 and PGM-5. The ships arrived at Mauban Harbor at 0805 hours and remained anchored there for about two hours. The ships then departed the harbor for a patrol of the coast which lasted the remainder of the day. PGM-3 then proceeded back to base in company of PC-1123.

Location	Map link
Marcelino Point	14.852°N 121.613°E,
Dilalongan	16.131°N 121.934°E,

On 20 May at 1733 hours, PGM-3 departed MTB Base 5 in company with PGM-6, en route to Polillo Island. The ships arrived there on 22 May and moored to the wharf at 0730 hours. That night the ships departed for patrol, en route to Casiguaran Sound. At 2135 hours the ships were in the vicinity of Marcelino Point, with PGM-6 putting a landing party ashore. The patrol continued and the ships arrived at Casiguran Sound at 0622 hours the next morning. Three hours later the ships were underway to pick up a scouting party in the vicinity of Colobgan. With the scouting party aboard PGM-3, the ships departed en route to a reported enemy encampment south of Dilalongan. After shelling the beach the ships continued to patrol along the coast and entered Dingalen Bay at 1550 hours. The PGMs then returned to Polillo, mooring at the wharf at 1936 hours, 23 May. PGM’s 3 and 6 departed Polillo at 1108 hours the next day for another patrol of the Luzon coast, returning at 2140 hours. The two ships conducted their last patrol on 26 May and departed from Polillo on 27 May en route to MTB Base 5.

Location	Map link
MTB Base 17	11.136°N 125.647°E,

During the month of June, PGM-3 was idle at MTB Base 5. The ship’s log entry for 25 June documents the presence of all PGMs of Division One at the base (PGMs 1, 2, 3, 4, 5, 6 and 8). PGM-3 left MTB Base 5 on 6 July en route to MTB Base 17 on the south end of Samar Island and returned on 8 July. The ship made another trip to MTB Base 17 on 11 July and remained there until 26 July. Then PGM-3 returned to MTB Base 5, arriving there on 27 July, where it remained until 4 August.

4 August at 1151 hours, PGM-3 was en route to rendezvous with PGM’s 1, 2, 4, and 6, for a mission to Morotai Island. After rendezvous, the PGMs departed at 1317 hours with PGM-4 serving at OTC. The PGMs arrived at Morotai on 6 August and anchored in the harbor at the southern tip of the island. Four days later the PGMs departed Morotai, proceeding to MTB Base 17 on Samar Island, arriving there on 12 August. The following day PGM-3 returned to MTB Base 5 where it remained until 5 September.

== Okinawa ==
5 September at 0740 hours, the ships of PGM Division One departed their base in the Philippine Islands en route to Buckner Bay, Okinawa. At 1415 hours on 9 September, PGM-3 passed through the anti-torpedo nets at Buckner Bay and at 1507 hours anchored in berth 150. Over the next week the ship shifted between many moorings in the bay and on 16 September at 1240 hours was moored starboard side to SC-760 at the Minesweep Dock, Section Base, Katchin Hanto, Buckner Bay. In the next entry of the ship’s log for the day, under the heading 1600 to 2000 hours, it is noted that the barometer was falling rapidly and a typhoon was approaching. Then under the heading 2000 to 2400 hours: "barometer falling rapidly, typhoon mounting with violence". The next day the ship remained moored next to SC-760 and nothing more about the typhoon is mentioned in the log.

== Service in Shanghai ==
Location	Map link
Blockhouse Island	31.399°N 121.690°E,

PGM-3 remained at Buckner Bay until 25 September, when it departed for Hagushi, Okinawa, arriving there the same day. The following day PGM-3 took on fuel and water in preparation for a trip to Shanghai, China. On 28 September at 1256 hours the PGM-3 departed Hagushi in company of LCI Group 65 bound for Shanghai, China, in accordance with orders from Commander LCI Flotilla Fifteen. Two days later PGM-3 anchored in 22 fathoms of water at the entrance to the Yangtze River. An hour and a half later the ship proceeded to a quarantine anchorage in the river. The next day the ship moved to an anchorage midstream on the Yangtze off Blockhouse Island and was also moored at times to SS Claus Spreckles and USS Robinson. On 3 October, PGM-3 made its way to Nippon Yusen Kaisha, Pootung Wharf, Huangpu River, Shanghai, where it moored port side to PGM-5. The PGM-3 remained in Shanghai until 5 November, moving between various moorings, going into dry dock on 25 October, and leaving dry dock on 2 November. During this period the ship’s log documents the presence in Shanghai of PGM’s 2, 4, 5 and 6.

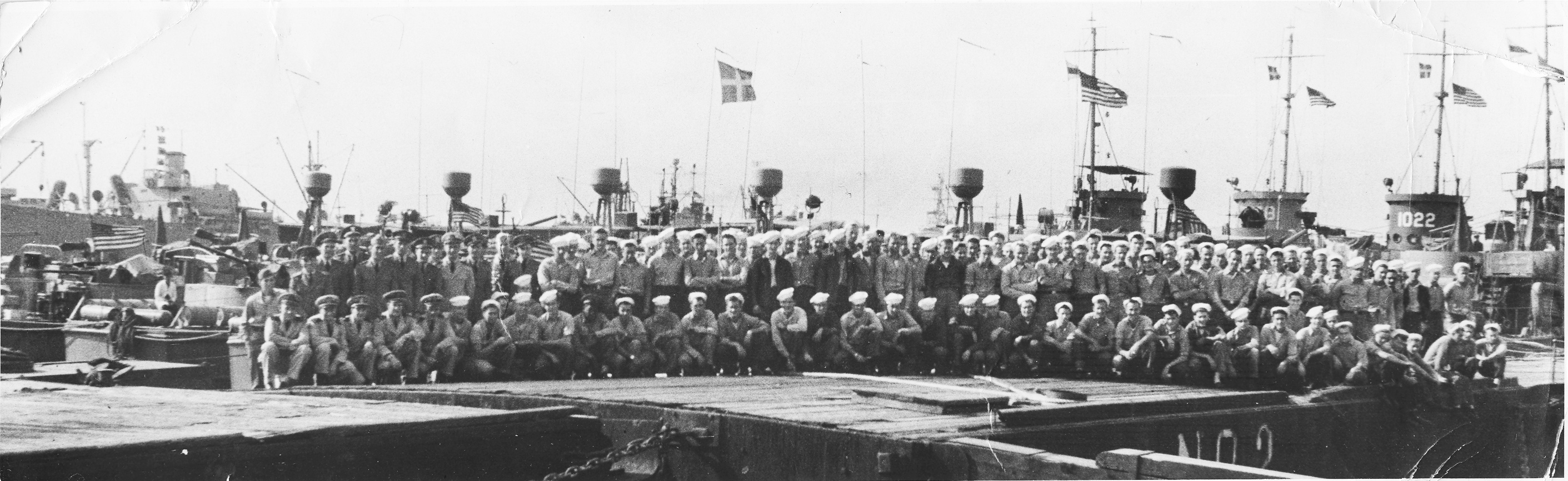
Officers and crew of PGM Division One, Shanghai, China, October or November, 1945. Six radar masts seen behind the men belong to the following ships: USS PGM-1, USS PGM-2, USS PGM-3, USS PGM-4, USS PGM-5, USS PGM-6

On 5 November the PGM-3 departed the Nippon Yusen Kaisha wharf at Shanghai and made its way to the Yangtze River, where it moored to USS Robinson briefly, then proceeded to an anchorage 3 miles west of Chung Poasha. At this location the ship observed Japanese mine sweeping operations and returned at the end of the day to moor overnight at the USS Robinson. PGM-3 was stationed on the Yangtze River the next day, two miles west of Middle Island, where it continued to monitor Japanese mine sweeping operations, returning at the end of the day to moor at the USS Robinson off Blockhouse Island. On 7 November, PGM-3 was underway at 0630 hours following minesweepers on various courses, stationed 1000 yards astern, returning to USS Robinson at the end of the day. The ship was engaged in the same activity the next day and was relieved at 0815 hours on 9 November. PGM-3 returned to Shanghai on 10 November and returned to mine sweep operations on the Yangtze the following day, serving duty as safety ship, and moored overnight at USS Robinson. On 12 November the ship concluded its duties as safety vessel and arrived back at Shanghai at 1642 hours, mooring next to PGM-1 at the Old NingPo wharf. PGM-3 remained at Shanghai until 27 November, when it departed to return to the Philippines.

== Return to the Philippines ==
On 27 November at 0642 hours, PGM-3 departed Shanghai in company with PGM’s 1, 4, 5, and 6, en route to Subic Bay, Philippine Islands. At 1418 hours the PGMs were anchored off the Yangtze entrance buoy, awaiting the arrival of USS Kenneth M. Willett (DE-354). The next day the PGMs departed in company of USS Willett, bound for Subic Bay. At 1250 hours on 29 November, the PGM-3, in accordance with AlPac 297, dropped all exposed ammunition in 1,466 fathoms of water. The convoy entered Subic Bay at 1440 hours on 2 December. The next day PGM-3 anchored at the Alva Docks, Naval Base, Olongapo, Subic Bay, Luzon, Philippine Islands. PGM-3 remained at this location until it was decommissioned on 12 January 1946.

All but 5 crew members of PGM-3 were billeted ashore at the Repair Base, Navy 3002, on 19 December. On 12 January 1946, USS PGM-3 was decommissioned.
