= USS PGM-7 =

Gunboat of the United States Navy

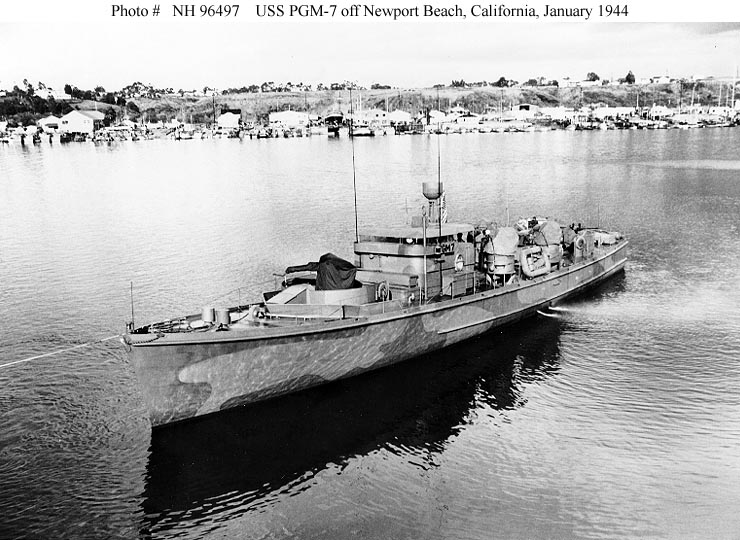
- USS PGM-7 after conversion from USS SC-1072

History

United States
- Builder: Mathis Yacht Building Co., Camden, New Jersey
- Laid down: 10 March 1943
- Launched: 17 June 1943
- Commissioned: 28 June 1943
- Fate: unknown believed scrapped after 31 August 1944

General characteristics
- Class & type: PGM-1 Class Motor Gunboat
- Displacement: 95 tons
- Length: 110 feet, 10 inches
- Propulsion: two 1,540bhp General Motors (Electro-Motive Div.) 16-184A diesel engines, two shafts
- Speed: 21 knots
- Complement: 28
- Armament: 1 × 3"/23 gun mount; 1 × 40 mm gun mount; 4 × twin .50 cal (12.7 mm) machine guns

USS PGM-7 was a gunboat that served in the United States Navy during World War 2. She was commissioned as USS SC-1072, an SC-497 Class Submarine Chaser on 28 June 1943. She was reclassified as a PGM-1 Class Motor Gunboat on 10 December 1943. She was dispatched to the Solomon Islands for patrol service.

== History ==
All twenty-four crew members reporting on board USS SC-1072, 28 June 1943, were received from the receiving station, Philadelphia, Pennsylvania. The official Reports of Changes for USS SC-1072 provide port locations and sailing destinations as follows:

19 July 43 sailing from Naval Air Station, Cape May, New Jersey to Jacksonville, Florida

11 August 43 sailing from Pier #2, S.C.T.C, Miami, Florida to Navy Section Base, Key West, Florida

15 August 43 sailing from N.O.B., Key West, Florida to Burwood, Mississippi

17 August 43 sailing from Burwood, Louisiana to Canal Zone [Burwood is located in the state of Louisiana, perhaps the 15 August entry refers to the Mississippi River as the location of Burwood?]

28 August 43 sailing from Naval Station, Coco Solo, Canal Zone to Naval Station, San Diego, California

14 September 43 sailing from Naval Base, San Diego, California to Naval Base, San Francisco, California

24 September 43 sailing from Naval Section Base, Treasure Island, California to Naval Section Base, Seattle, Washington

19 November 43 sailing from NavSta, Pier 41, Seattle, Washington to Naval Operating Base, San Pedro, California

23 November 43 sailing from NavSecBase, Treasure Island, California to Naval Operating Base, San Pedro, California

23 January 1944, USS PGM-7 departed San Pedro, California, headed for Pearl Harbor, Territory of Hawaii, in company of PGM's 1, 2, 3, 4, 5, 6 and 8 and USS Armadillo (IX-111). The Armadillo provided fuel and water for the PGM's in transit to Hawaii. The Log Book of USS PGM-3 contains the following entry for 25 January 1045 hours: "U.S.S. PGM-2 reported bad leak and was ordered by Senior Officer Present Afloat to return to port accompanied by U.S.S. PGM-4 as escort". PGM-7 and the remaining ships continued their journey, arriving at Pearl Harbor on 1 February. On 12 February the PGM-7 left Pearl Harbor en route to Palmyra Atoll in company of PGM's 8, 5, 3 and 1 and arrived there 15 February. The next day the five PGM's continued their journey en route to Pago Pago, Tutuila Island, American Samoa, arriving there on 20 February.

Sadly, Edmund Roman Niess, Machinist's Mate first class, a member of the crew of PGM-7, drowned in an accident on 23 February 1944, in Pago Pago Harbor. He was buried in the USMC Cemetery, Tutuila, the next day. Niess was the only member of the crew of PGM-7 lost during the war according to the official Reports of Changes for the ship.

The five PGM's left Pago Pago on 24 February, headed toward Suva, Viti Levu, Fiji, arriving there on 27 February after adjusting the ships' clocks forward one day. PGM's 8, 5, 3 and 7 departed Suva on 28 February en route to Nouméa, New Caledonia, arriving there 2 March. The same four PGM's departed Nouméa 10 days later en route for Espiritu Santo, New Hebrides, arriving there 14 March. PGM-7 departed for the Solomon Islands on 15 March in company of PGM's 5 and 8, arriving at Guadalcanal two days later. After a short stay at Guadalcanal, the ships crossed over to nearby Tulagi, Florida Islands (known today as Nggela Islands).

After a stay of nearly two weeks, PGM's 5, 7 and 8 departed the Florida Islands on 29 March en route for Rendova Island, New Georgia Islands, Solomon Islands. On 6 April, PGM-7 departed Rendova in company of PGM-5 headed for the Motor Torpedo Boat Base #9, Treasury Islands, arriving there on the same day. MTB Base #9 served as the home base for the remainder of PGM-7's navy career.

Two days after arriving at MTB Base #9, PGM-7 departed at 1743 hours on 8 April for its first patrol of the coastal waters of southwest Bougainville Island. Over the next three months, PGM-7 conducted anti-barge and anti-submarine patrols along the southwest and southeast coasts of Bougainville, the general vicinity of Fauro Island, and the west coast of Choiseul Island. The ship was accompanied on these patrols by various other PGM ships of PGM Division One as well as various PT boats from nearby squadrons.

Starting at the end of June 1944, the PGM-7 participated in a prolonged patrol along the northwestern coast of New Ireland (island), in view, at a distance, of night attacks on the Japanese base at Rabaul on New Britain. On 28 June, PGM's 5, 7 and 8 departed Torokina for New Ireland to patrol area "uncle". The patrol included the coastal locations of Tambaker Point, Huru Point and Cape Roloss. The ships visited the advance base at Green Islands, arriving the afternoon of 1 July and departing the afternoon of 4 July, taking on fuel and water and doing other unspecified work during this period. The PGMs returned to the same patrol area, concluding their patrol on 7 July and arriving back at MTB Base #9 on the Treasury Islands on 8 July.

In the early morning hours of 18 July, PGM-7 departed MTB Base #9 for another patrol of New Ireland in company of PGM's 4, 5 and 8. At 0543 hours PGM-7 was severely damaged in a collision with PGM-4. An eyewitness account of the collision is available in the book Splinter Fleet by Theodore R. Treadwell. Heavy seas contributed to difficulties in maintaining proper patrol formation and PGM-4 lost track of PGM-7 on radar. Suddenly the PGM-7 appeared off the starboard bow of PGM-4 and it was too late to prevent a collision. Contrary to other reports, the official Log Book of PGM-7 establishes for a fact that the ship did not sink. Quoted here are the entries in the ship's log for 18 July 1944 and subsequent dates:

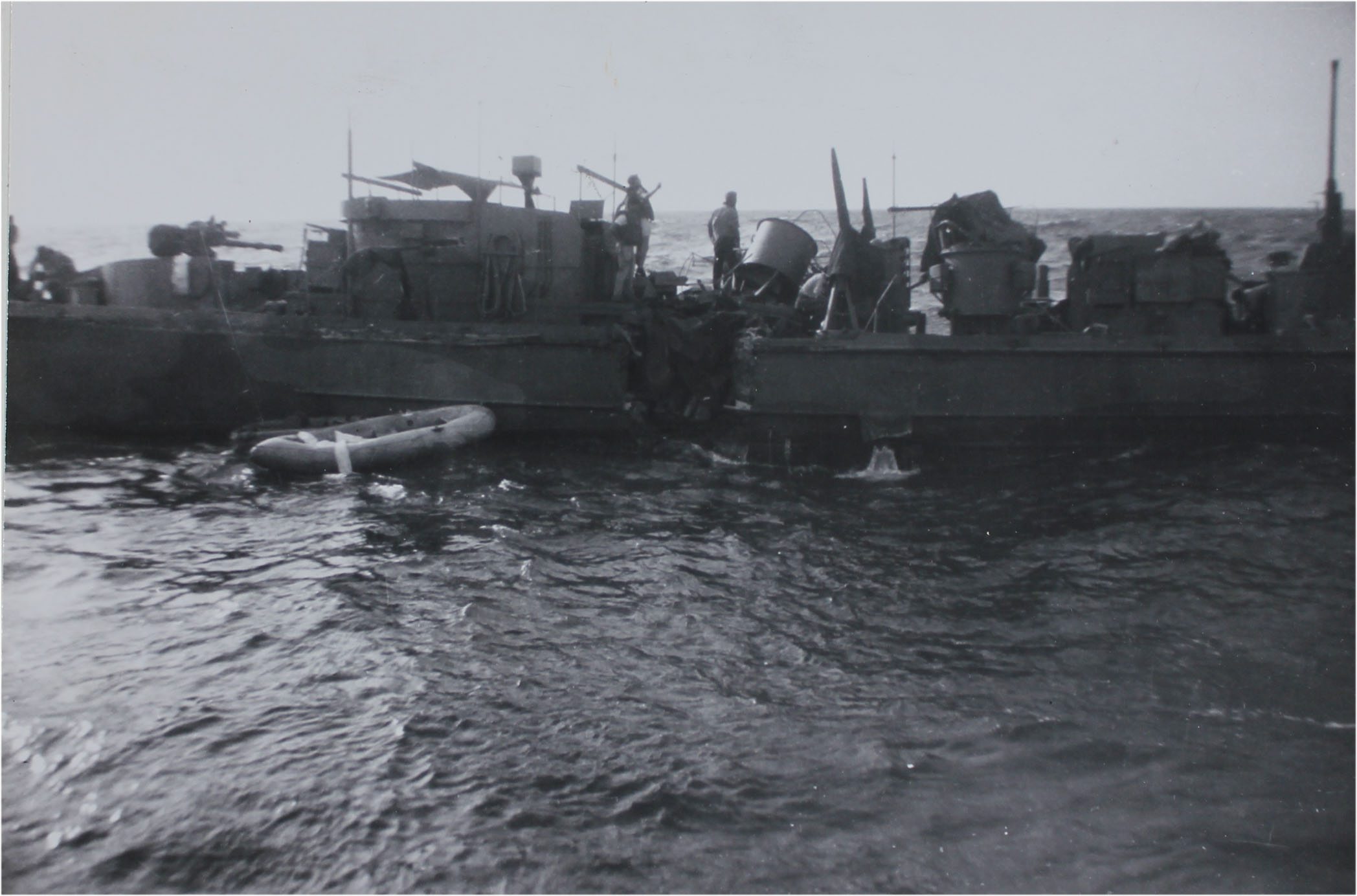
National Archives photo no. 80-G-2811314 USS PGM-7 following ramming by USS PGM-4. Taken from USS PGM-5. 18 July 1944

18 July 1944

"0300 underway from Sterling Harbor, Treasury Islands, en route to New Ireland and New Britain for operations in company with PGMs 4, 5 & 8 “

"0543 rammed by PGM 4 in engine room, port side. Collision piped by watch topside, General alarm dead, all hands given word to put on life jackets, PGM 4 drifted out of hole alongside port side, bow facing PGM 7’s stern, Captain went aboard PGM 4, directed all hands to abandon ship, 19 men abandon ship before ships drifted apart, Executive and Third Officer and 8 men aboard PGM 7, Executive Officer passes word to men still aboard to jettison all ammunition on starboard side of forward magazine, engine room flooded 30 inches above deck, control room had 6 inches above deck, after crew’s quarters reported by Savage, J.J., PhM1c, water up to deck boards, permission granted by Executive Officer to jettison 40mm ammunition in after magazine, Captain returned aboard in rubber life raft with Reuter, J.E, BM1c and proceeded to unload after magazine, when magazine emptied with exception of port side of forward magazine, in order to counter-balance starboard list, 2 barbettes were jettisoned, during this time the water had risen above the deck in the after crew’s quarters and attempts were made to pump out the water with a gasoline handy-billy, it failed to start and soon after Lt. (jg) Lindblooom and two MoMMs came aboard from the PGM 5 in a rubber life raft and attempted to start handy-billy, it failed and the PGM 5 sent over their handy-billy which also failed, later these pumps were operated successfully"

"0745 PGM 8 attempted to tow the PGM 7 with the anchor chain but the attempt failed after five minutes when the chain parted"

"0830 PGM 8 attempted to tow the PGM 7 with the six inch hawser approximately 200 feet in length, this also failed several minutes later when the tow line parted due to the short length of the line used"

“ 0945 PGM 8 again attempts to tow with their own anchor chain, this attempt also failed about 45 minutes when chain parted"

"1000 the gasoline handy-billy began to work and the after compartment and the tank compartment were continually pumped thereafter"

"1240 U.S.S. YMS 249 came alongside to tow us in, proceeding at 1250"

"1846 through nets, U.S.S. YMS 249 still towing"

"1900 PGM 8 received tow and brought us up to Steaming Dock, Sterling Harbor, Treasury Islands".

“19 July “ "0000-0400 moored as before alongside Dry Dock Pier at Sterling Harbor, Treasury Islands, being patched temporarily"

“26 July “ "Moored as before"

"0715 getting underway, secured alongside PGM 4, proceeding in harbor, en route for Purvis Bay “

"0755 through nets “

"0800 PGM 4 left alongside, now taking tow, speed 5 knots"

"0800-1200 being towed by PGM 4 en route to Purvis Bay, speed 5 knots, using 1200 feet ¾ inch cable, temporarily patched on deck and port side, 2 gasoline pumps on board for purpose of pumping bilges, 8 men and 2 officers aboard"

“28 July” "1130 Carter City [Florida Islands], now secured to Sub-Buoy in harbor, PGM 4 left for water"

“31 August 1944” [last page of log] "0000-0400 moored as before at Carter City, Small Craft Repair Base, Florida Island area, in dry dock, using portable gasoline generator for ships power, crew living on base, officers living aboard, awaiting further orders from Bureau"

The final fate of PGM-7 is not indicated in the ship's log. It was apparently scrapped by the navy due to extensive damage to the hull.

Fate of the crew of PGM-7

All 27 crew and 3 officers of PGM-7 survived the collision of 18 July 1944. The PGM-7 Report of Changes for the month ending 31 July 1944, lists 19 crew members transferred to MTBRons, Base 9, Navy 811, Treasury Islands, for temporary duty. The PGM Division One (Base Force at Treasury Islands) Report of Changes for the month ending 30 September 1944, lists 28 crew members received from PGM-7 on 17 September 1944, with 14 transferred the same day to other PGMs of Division One (the extra crew member reported aboard after the collision).
