= USS LST-465 =

1943 LST-1-class tank landing ship

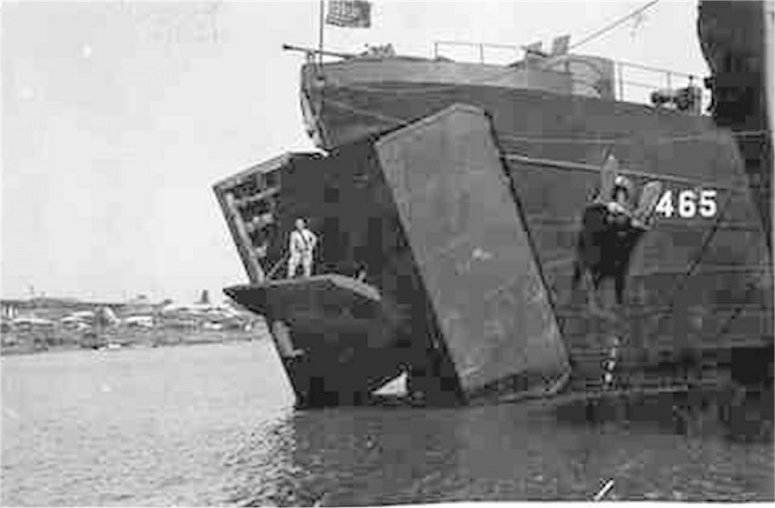
- USS LST-465, moored in a nest of LSTs, date and location unknown.

History

United States
- Name: LST-465
- Ordered: as a Type S3-M-K2 hull, MCE hull 985
- Builder: Kaiser Shipbuilding Company, Vancouver, Washington
- Yard number: 169
- Laid down: 17 December 1942
- Launched: 9 January 1943
- Commissioned: 27 February 1943
- Decommissioned: 8 March 1946
- Stricken: 12 April 1946
- Identification: Hull symbol: LST-465; Code letters: NFRC
- Honors and awards: 6 × battle stars
- Fate: Sold for scrapping, 30 September 1947

General characteristics
- Class & type: LST-1-class tank landing ship
- Displacement: 4,080 long tons (4,145 t) full load; 2,160 long tons (2,190 t) landing
- Length: 328 ft (100 m) oa
- Beam: 50 ft (15 m)
- Draft: Full load: 8 ft 2 in (2.49 m) forward; 14 ft 1 in (4.29 m) aft; Landing at 2,160 t: 3 ft 11 in (1.19 m) forward; 9 ft 10 in (3.00 m) aft
- Installed power: 2 × 900 hp (670 kW) Electro-Motive Diesel 12-567A diesel engines; 1,700 shp (1,300 kW)
- Propulsion: 1 × Falk main reduction gears; 2 × Propellers
- Speed: 12 kn (22 km/h; 14 mph)
- Range: 24,000 nmi (44,000 km; 28,000 mi) at 9 kn (17 km/h; 10 mph) while displacing 3,960 long tons (4,024 t)
- Boats & landing craft carried: 2 or 6 x LCVPs
- Capacity: 2,100 tons oceangoing maximum; 350 tons main deckload
- Troops: 16 officers, 147 enlisted men
- Complement: 13 officers, 104 enlisted men
- Armament: Varied, ultimate armament; 2 × twin 40 mm (1.57 in) Bofors guns; 4 × single 40 mm Bofors guns; 12 × 20 mm (0.79 in) Oerlikon cannons

Service record
- Operations: Bismarck Archipelago operation; Cape Gloucester, New Britain (26–28 December 1943, 30 December–3 January 1944, 9–11, 22–25 January, 30 January–2 February, 13–16 February 1944); Admiralty Islands landings (11–15 March 1944); Eastern New Guinea operation; Saidor occupation (4–7, 17–19, 21–23, 25–28 February 1944); Hollandia operation (21–26 April 1944); Western New Guinea operation; Toem-Wakde-Sarmi area operation (17–19 and 21–23 May 1944); Morotai landing (15 September 1944); Leyte landings (13–28 October, 10–29 November 1944); Lingayen Gulf landings (8–16 January 1945)
- Awards: American Campaign Medal; Asiatic–Pacific Campaign Medal; World War II Victory Medal; Navy Occupation Service Medal w/Asia Clasp; Philippine Republic Presidential Unit Citation; Philippine Liberation Medal

USS LST-465 was a United States Navy LST-1-class tank landing ship used in the Asiatic-Pacific Theater during World War II. As with many of her class, the ship was never named. Instead, she was referred to by her hull designation.

== Construction ==
The ship was laid down on 17 December 1942, under Maritime Commission (MARCOM) contract, MC hull 985, by Kaiser Shipyards, Vancouver, Washington; launched 9 January 1943; and commissioned on 27 February 1943,

== Service history ==
During World War II, LST-465 was assigned to the Asiatic-Pacific theater. She took part in the Bismarck Archipelago operation, the Cape Gloucester, New Britain, landings from December 1943 through February 1944, and the Admiralty Islands landings in March 1944; the Eastern New Guinea operation, the Saidor occupation in February 1944; Hollandia operation in April 1944; the Western New Guinea operations, the Toem-Wakde-Sarmi area operation in May 1944, and the Morotai landing in September 1944; the Leyte operation in October and November 1944; and the Lingayen Gulf landings in January 1945.

Following the war, LST-465 performed occupation duty in the Far East in October and November 1945. Upon her return to the United States, the tank landing ship was decommissioned on 8 March 1946, and struck from the Navy list on 12 April 1946. On 30 September 1947, she was sold to Patapsco Scrap Corp., Baltimore, Maryland, for scrapping.

== Honors and awards ==
LST-465 earned six battle stars for her World War II service.

== Notes ==
Citations

== Bibliography ==
Online resources

- "LST-465". Dictionary of American Naval Fighting Ships. Naval History and Heritage Command. 3 August 2015. This article incorporates text from this source, which is in the public domain.
- "Kaiser Vancouver, Vancouver WA". www.ShipbuildingHistory.com. 27 November 2010.
- "USS LST-465". NavSource. 10 October 2014.
