= USS PCS-1379 =

Minesweeper of the United States Navy

History

United States
- Name: USS PCS-1379
- Builder: Wheeler Shipbuilding Corporation, Whitestone, Long Island, New York
- Laid down: 25 February 1943
- Launched: 4 February 1944
- Acquired: March 1944
- Commissioned: 6 March 1944
- Fate: Unknown

General characteristics
- Class & type: PCS-1376 class patrol craft sweeper
- Displacement: 245 long tons (249 t) light; 340 long tons (345 t) full load
- Length: 136 ft (41 m)
- Beam: 24 ft 6 in (7.47 m)
- Draft: 7 ft 9 in (2.36 m)
- Propulsion: 2 × General Motors 8-268A diesel engines, 800 bhp (597 kW) each; Snow and Knobstedt single reduction gear; 2 shafts
- Speed: 14 knots (26 km/h; 16 mph)
- Complement: 57 officers and enlisted
- Armament: 1 × 3"/50 caliber gun; 1 × 40 mm gun; 2 × 20 mm guns; 4 × depth charge projectors; 1 × Hedgehog anti-submarine mortar; 2 × depth charge tracks

USS PCS-1379 was the fourth of twelve patrol craft sweepers constructed by Wheeler Shipbuilding Corporation, Whitestone, Long Island, New York.

She was one of a total of 59 of this type to be delivered to the Navy by various shipyards. PCS-1376 through 1387 were designed as submarine chasers, but were launched after the need for coastal escorts had passed.

PCS-1379 spent much of World War II in the Pacific Theater. She was one of thirteen PCS vessels converted to a PCS(C) for control of landing craft with the aft 40 mm mount replaced by a small deckhouse.

== Service history ==
Delivered in March 1944 her plank-holding crew reported for duty aboard PCS-1379 at Lido Beach, New York.

PCS-1379 transited the Panama Canal to Hawaii before participating in combat. She crossed the equator at 163 deg East, north to south on 23 August 1944.

During the Mariana and Palau Islands campaign she participated in the invasion of Peleliu Island and Angaur Island on 15–17 September 1944. She shelled Japanese targets on Eil Malk and Abappaomogan Islands on 30–31 October 1944.

In the Volcano and Ryukyu Islands campaign of 1945 she participated in the invasion of the Ryukyu Islands as follows:

- Kerama Retto, 26–31 March 1945
- Okinawa, 1 April 1945
- Menna Shima, 15 April 1945
- Ie Shima, 16 April 1945

PCS-1379 returned to Hawaii, and then back through the Panama Canal, reaching Long Island, NY on or around 15 August 1945.
