= USS Armadillo =

History

United States
- Name: Sidney Howard; Armadillo
- Namesake: Sidney Howard; The armadillo
- Ordered: as a Type T1-S-C3 hull, MCE hull 1900
- Builder: California Shipbuilding Corporation, Terminal Island, Los Angeles, California
- Yard number: T21
- Way number: 3
- Laid down: 24 September 1943
- Launched: 26 October 1943
- Commissioned: 18 November 1943
- Decommissioned: 29 May 1946
- Stricken: 19 June 1946
- Identification: Hull symbol: IX-111; Code letters: NJGW
- Honors and awards: 1 × battle star
- Fate: returned to MARCOM, 29 May 1946, laid up in the National Defense Reserve Fleet, James River Group, Lee Hall, Virginia. Sold, 26 January 1948, withdrawn, 3 February 1948

United States
- Name: Dean H.
- Owner: Windear Navigation Co
- Acquired: 14 April 1948
- Fate: Sold, November 1954

Liberia
- Name: Dean H.
- Acquired: November 1954
- Refit: 1955, to a dry cargo ship
- Fate: Sold, 2 March 1959

United States
- Name: Chris H.
- Owner: Winco Tankers Inc.
- Acquired: 2 March 1959
- Fate: Exchanged to the Maritime Administration (MARAD), 26 December 1962, returned 7 February 1963

United States
- Name: Dean H.
- Owner: MARAD
- Acquired: 7 February 1963
- Fate: Returned to MARCOM, 7 February 1963, sold for scrapping, 22 February 1972, withdrawn from fleet, 10 March 1972

General characteristics
- Class & type: Armadillo class tanker
- Type: Type T1-S-C3
- Displacement: 14,500 long tons (14,700 t)
- Length: 441 ft 6 in (134.57 m)
- Beam: 56 ft 11 in (17.35 m)
- Draught: 28 ft 4 in (8.64 m)
- Installed power: 2 × Babcock & Wilcox header-type boilers, 215psi 450°; 2,500 shp (1,900 kW)
- Propulsion: 1 × vertical triple-expansion reciprocating steam engine; 1 × propeller
- Speed: 11 kn (20 km/h; 13 mph)
- Complement: 10 officers 69 enlisted
- Armament: 1 × 5 in (127 mm)/38 caliber dual purpose (DP) gun; 1 × 3 in (76 mm)/50 caliber DP gun; 8 × 20 mm (0.79 in) Oerlikon cannon anti-aircraft gun mounts

USS Armadillo (IX-111), the lead ship of her class of tanker was the only ship of the United States Navy to be named for the armadillo, an insect-eating mammal which has an armorlike shell encasing its back and head.

== Construction ==
She was laid down 24 September 1943, under a Maritime Commission (MARCOM) contract, MC hull No. 1900, as the Type T1 tanker Sidney Howard, by California Shipbuilding Corporation, Terminal Island, Los Angeles, California; launched on 26 October 1943; sponsored by Mrs. S. Howard; renamed Armadillo and designated IX-111; acquired by the Navy on a bareboat basis, and simultaneously placed in commission at San Pedro, Los Angeles, on 18 November 1943.

== Service history ==
Following her commissioning, the vessel began a period of final fitting out and shakedown training off the southern California coast. In January 1944, Armadillo was assigned to Service Force, US Pacific Fleet, and sailed for Pearl Harbor. From early February through early April 1944, the vessel carried personnel and petroleum products between Pearl Harbor and Tarawa, Gilbert Islands. On 22 April, she reported to Majuro Atoll, Marshall Islands, where she served as a station tanker through late August. Armadillo then shifted to Ulithi, Caroline Islands, to perform the same duty. This service was broken by trips to Guam and Saipan in the Mariana Islands and to Peleliu in the Palau Islands.

Armadillo left Ulithi on 10 April 1945, and shaped a course for Okinawa. She arrived there on 18 April, and began providing services to various ships of the Pacific Fleet. On 1 February 1946, the tanker departed Buckner Bay, Okinawa, and headed for the East Coast of the United States. She transited the Panama Canal on 13 March, and continued on to Norfolk, Virginia. The vessel reached that port on 23 March, and began preparations for her inactivation. Armadillo was decommissioned on 29 May 1946, and, on the same day, was delivered to MARCOM's War Shipping Administration (WSA) at Lee Hall, Virginia, and laid up in the National Defense Reserve Fleet's James River Group. Her name was struck from the Naval Vessel Register on 19 June 1946.

== Merchant service ==
Acquired by Hasler & Co., agents, for the Windsor Navigation Co., on 3 February 1948, the ship was delivered to her purchaser at Baltimore, Maryland, on 14 April 1948. Renamed Dean H. She was later sold to Liberian interests in November 1954, but returned to the US flag on 3 March 1959. Sold to Winco Tankers, Inc., on the same day, she was renamed Chris H., and carried that name until the title returned to the Maritime Administration (MARAD) the day after Christmas of 1962. Then operated by Winco Tankers, Inc., under a bareboat charter, Chris H. was deactivated on 7 February 1963, and returned to the James River Reserve Fleet where she remained until purchased by N. V. Intershitra on 22 February 1972. She was delivered to her purchaser on 10 March 1972, to be broken up for scrap in the Netherlands.

== Awards ==
Armadillo earned one battle star for her World War II service.

== Notes ==
Citations

== Bibliography ==
Online resources

- "Armadillo (IX-111)". Dictionary of American Naval Fighting Ships. Naval History and Heritage Command. 12 December 2016. This article incorporates text from this source, which is in the public domain.
- "California Shipbuilding, Los Angeles CA". ShipbuildingHistory.com. 13 October 2010.
- "USS Armadillo (IX-111)". NavSource. 18 January 2013.
- "SIDNEY HOWARD". United States Department of Transportation. Archived from the original on 12 December 2019.
