= List of SC-1-class subchasers (SC-1 to SC-50) =

The SC-1-class was a large class of submarine chasers built during World War I for the United States Navy. They were ordered in very large numbers in order to combat attacks by German U-boats, with 442 boats built from 1917 to 1919. This article lists details of the first 50 ships of the class.

== Ships ==
Number	Builder	Commissioned	Fate	Notes
USS SC-1	Naval Station, New Orleans	1 October 1917	Sold 20 July 1921	Served in European waters during World War 1.
USS SC-2	Naval Station, New Orleans	8 January 1918	Sold 29 October 1930 to city of New Orleans.	Served in Gulf of Mexico.
USS SC-3	Naval Station, New Orleans	21 January 1918	Sold 4 October 1920.	Served in Gulf of Mexico.
USS SC-4	Naval Station, New Orleans	19 February 1918	Sold 19 March 1920.	Served in Gulf of Mexico.
USS SC-5	New York Navy Yard	18 August 1917	To France as C-5.	
USS SC-6	New York Navy Yard	19 August 1917	Sold 24 June 1921.	
USS SC-7	New York Navy Yard	18 August 1917	To France as C-2.	Sunk by German bomber at Dunkirk, September 1917
USS SC-8	New York Navy Yard	18 August 1917	To France as C-1.	
USS SC-9	New York Navy Yard	18 August 1917	To France as C-3.	Destroyed by fire at Dunkirk, 2 June 1918
USS SC-10	New York Navy Yard	18 August 1917	To France as C-4.	
USS SC-11	New York Navy Yard	18 August 1917	To France as C-6.	
USS SC-12	New York Navy Yard	29 September 1917	To France as C-7.	
USS SC-13	New York Navy Yard	29 September 1917	To France as C-9.	
USS SC-14	New York Navy Yard	29 September 1917	To France as C-10.	
USS SC-15	New York Navy Yard	29 September 1917	To France as C-11.	
USS SC-16	New York Navy Yard	29 September 1917	To France as C-8.	
USS SC-17	New York Navy Yard	8 November 1917	Sold 24 June 1921	
USS SC-18	New York Navy Yard	10 November 1917	Transferred to US War Department 1920.	
USS SC-19	New York Navy Yard	19 October 1917	Sold 24 June 1921.	
USS SC-20	New York Navy Yard	18 October 1917	Transferred to US War Department 1920.	
USS SC-21	New York Navy Yard	19 October 1917	Sold 24 June 1921.	
USS SC-22	New York Navy Yard	16 October 1917	To US Coast Guard 14 November 1919 as USCGC Quigley.	Sold 1 May 1922
USS SC-23	New York Navy Yard	16 October 1917	Destroyed by fire 1920.	
USS SC-24	New York Navy Yard	22 October 1917	Sold 24 June 1921.	Served in Atlantic Fleet operating out of New London
USS SC-25	New York Navy Yard	16 October 1917	Sold 24 June 1921.	Served in Atlantic Fleet.
USS SC-26	New York Navy Yard	19 October 1917	Sold 24 June 1921.	
USS SC-27	New York Navy Yard	8 November 1917	To US Coast Guard 13 November 1919 as USCGC Richards.	Sold 29 January 1923
USS SC-28	New York Navy Yard	22 December 1917	To France as C-24	
USS SC-29	New York Navy Yard	22 December 1917	To France as C-23.	
USS SC-30	New York Navy Yard	30 March 1918	To France as C-33	
USS SC-31	New York Navy Yard	18 May 1918	To France as C-46	
USS SC-32	New York Navy Yard	30 March 1918	To France as C-41.	
USS SC-33	New York Navy Yard	5 October 1918	To France as C-42	
USS SC-34	New York Navy Yard	9 January 1918	Sold 24 June 1921.	
USS SC-35	New York Navy Yard	23 January 1918	Sold 24 June 1921.	
USS SC-36	New York Navy Yard	23 January 1918	Sold 24 June 1921.	Served in European waters (based at Plymouth, England) during war.
USS SC-37	New York Navy Yard	1 February 1918	Sold 24 June 1921.	Took part in minesweeping operations in North Sea.
USS SC-38	New York Navy Yard	1 February 1918	Sold December 1919.	Served in European waters.
USS SC-39	New York Navy Yard	2 March 1918	Sold 24 June 1921.	Served in European waters (based at Plymouth, England) during war.
USS SC-40	New York Navy Yard	13 February 1918	Sold 14 October 1924.	Took part in minesweeping operations in North Sea in 1919.
USS SC-41	New York Navy Yard	19 Febryuary 1918	Sold 11 May 1921.	Served in European waters.
USS SC-42	New York Navy Yard	2 March 1918	Sold 24 June 1921.	
USS SC-43	New York Navy Yard	16 May 1918	Sold 24 June 1921.	
USS SC-44	New York Navy Yard	3 April 1918	Sold 24 June 1921.	
USS SC-45	New York Navy Yard	1 March 1918	Sold 24 June 1921.	Took part in minesweeping operations in North Sea in 1919.
USS SC-46	New York Navy Yard	16 March 1918	Sold 24 June 1921.	Served in European waters (based at Queenstown (now Cobh)) during war. Took part in minesweeping operations in North Sea in 1919.
USS SC-47	New York Navy Yard	27 March 1918	Sold 24 June 1921.	Served in European waters (based at Plymouth and Queenstown) during war and minesweeping operations in North Sea in 1919.
USS SC-48	New York Navy Yard	27 March 1918	Sold 24 June 1921.	Served in European waters (based at Plymouth, England) during war.
USS SC-49	New York Navy Yard	27 March 1918	Sold 24 June 1921.	
USS SC-50	New York Navy Yard	19 April 1918	Sold 24 June 1921.	

== See also ==
- List of patrol vessels of the United States Navy
- List of SC-1-class subchasers (SC-51 to SC-100)
- List of SC-1-class subchasers (SC-101 to SC-150)
- List of SC-1-class subchasers (SC-151 to SC-200)
- List of SC-1-class subchasers (SC-201 to SC-250)
- List of SC-1-class subchasers (SC-251 to SC-300)
- List of SC-1-class subchasers (SC-301 to SC-350)
- List of SC-1-class subchasers (SC-351 to SC-400)
- List of SC-1-class subchasers (SC-401 to SC-448)
