= SC 38 =

SC 38 or SC-38 may refer to:

- South Carolina Highway 38
- USS SC-38, a United States Navy submarine chaser in commission from 1918 to 1919
- Star Wars: SC 38 – Reimagined, a 2019 Star Wars fan project
