= SC 42 =

SC 42 may refer to:

- Siemens SC-42, a model of the Siemens Charger locomotive.
- Convoy SC 42, a World War II transatlantic convoy of merchant ships
- USS SC-42, a United States Navy submarine chaser commissioned in 1918 and sold in 1921
- Scandium-42 (Sc-42 or ^{42}Sc), an isotope of scandium
- South Carolina Highway 42 (1920s), a former state highway from Sumter to Bishopville
- South Carolina Highway 42 (1930s–1940s), a former state highway from northeast of Cope to Orangeburg
