= SC-44 =

SC-44 may refer to:

== Transportation and vehicles ==
- Siemens SC-44, the first production model of the Siemens Charger locomotive.
- Honda SC44, a motorcycle, a model of the Honda CBR900RR-series
- USS SC-44, a United States Navy submarine chaser commissioned in 1918 and sold in 1921.
- South Carolina Highway 44 (disambiguation) (SC-44), several highways in the United States

== Other uses ==
- Scandium-44 (^{44}Sc), an unstable isotope of the chemical element scandium.
