= SC34 =

SC34 or S.C. 34 may refer to:

- (48792) 1997 SC_{34}, asteroid belt minor planet
- ISO/IEC JTC 1/SC 34, ISO document subcommittee of Joint Technical Committee 1
- South Carolina Highway 34, primary state highway in South Carolina
- USS SC-34, United States Navy submarine chaser commissioned in 1918 and sold in 1921
