= S.C. 22 =

S.C. 22 may refer to:

- South Carolina Highway 22
- USS SC-22, a United States Navy submarine chaser in commission from 1917 to 1919
