= SC4 =

SC4 may refer to:

- Au Cap (ISO 3166-2:SC code SC-04), an administrative district of Seychelles located on the island of Mahé
- USS SC-4, an SC-1-class submarine chaser built for the United States Navy during World War I
- SC04, a FIPS code for Saint George Gingerland Parish, Saint Kitts and Nevis
- SC4, an uncultivated bacterial phylum
- SimCity 4, a 2003 city-building computer game
- South Carolina Highway 4, a 54.2-mile-long (87.2-kilometer) state highway in the southern part of the U.S. state of South Carolina
- South Carolina's 4th congressional district, a congressional district in upstate South Carolina bordering North Carolina
- St. Clair County Community College, a two-year community college located in Port Huron, Michigan
- Super Castlevania IV, a 1991 video game
