= South Carolina Highway 42 =

South Carolina Highway 42 may refer to:

- South Carolina Highway 42 (1920s), a former state highway from Sumter to Bishopville
- South Carolina Highway 42 (1930s–1940s), a former state highway from northeast of Cope to Orangeburg
