= SC-40 =

SC-40 may refer to:

- ISO/IEC JTC 1/SC 40, a standardization subcommittee of the ISO/IEC JTC 1 on IT Service Management and IT Governance
- SC-40, a computer developed by Systems Concepts
- USS SC-40, a United States Navy submarine chaser commissioned in 1918 and sold in 1924
- Scandium-40 (Sc-40 or ^{40}Sc), an isotope of scandium
