= SC-20 =

SC-20 may refer to:

- SC-20, a DEC PDP-10-compatible computer developed by Systems Concepts
- USS SC-20, a United States Navy submarine chaser commissioned in 1917 and transferred to the United States Department of War in 1920
