= USS SC-25 =

SC-1-class submarine chaser of the United States Navy

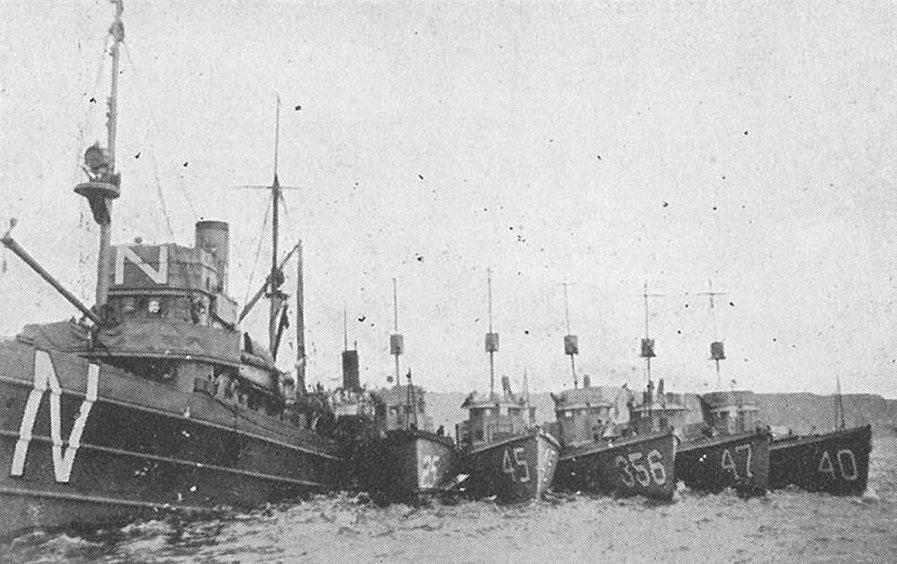
- S.C. 25 is second from left in this photograph taken in a North Sea port (probably Kirkwall in the Orkney Islands) in 1919 during the clearance of the North Sea Mine Barrage. The United States Navy minesweeper USS Eider (Minesweeper No. 17) is at left, bearing the identification marking "N". To the right of S.C. 25 are (left to right) Submarine Chaser No. 45, Submarine Chaser No. 356, Submarine Chaser No. 47, and Submarine Chaser No. 40.

History

United States
- Name: USS Submarine Chaser No. 25 (1917–1920); USS SC-25 (1920–1921)
- Builder: New York Navy Yard, Brooklyn, New York
- Commissioned: 16 October 1917
- Reclassified: SC-25 on 17 July 1920
- Fate: Sold 24 June 1921

General characteristics
- Class & type: SC-1-class submarine chaser
- Displacement: 77 tons normal; 85 tons full load
- Length: 110 ft (34 m) overall; 105 ft (32 m) between perpendiculars
- Beam: 14 ft 9 in (4.50 m)
- Draft: 5 ft 7 in (1.70 m) normal; 6 ft 6 in (1.98 m) full load
- Propulsion: Three 220 bhp (160 kW) Standard Motor Construction Company six-cylinder gasoline engines, three shafts, 2,400 US gallons (9,100 L) of gasoline; one Standard Motor Construction Company two-cylinder gasoline-powered auxiliary engine
- Speed: 18 knots (33 km/h)
- Range: 1,000 nautical miles (1,900 km) at 10 knots (19 km/h)
- Complement: 27 (2 officers, 25 enlisted men)
- Sensors & processing systems: One Submarine Signal Company S.C. C Tube, M.B. Tube, or K Tube hydrophone
- Armament: 1 × 3-inch (76.2 mm)/23-caliber gun mount; 2 × Colt .30 caliber (7.62 mm) machine guns; 1 × Y-gun depth charge projector

USS SC-25, until July 1920 known as USS Submarine Chaser No. 25 or USS S.C. 25, was an SC-1-class submarine chaser of the United States Navy, commissioned on 16 October 1917 at the New York Navy Yard in Brooklyn, New York.

A wooden-hulled 110-foot (34 m) vessel, she spent the war on coastal patrol before sailing to the North Sea after the Armistice of 11 November 1918 to assist in clearing the North Sea Mine Barrage. She was photographed at Kirkwall in the Orkney Islands in 1919, moored alongside USS Eider and four other chasers. Redesignated SC-25 when the U.S. Navy overhauled its hull classification system on 17 July 1920, she was sold the following year on 24 June 1921 to Joseph G. Hitner of Philadelphia, Pennsylvania.

== Background: the SC-1 class ==
=== Origins and design ===
The SC-1-class originated in the German unrestricted submarine warfare campaign that was strangling Allied Atlantic supply lines. In 1916, two German submarines made port visits to the United States and shortly afterward sank five merchant ships — a demonstration that shocked the United States Navy into planning a countermeasure even before America had entered the war. Franklin D. Roosevelt, then Assistant Secretary of the Navy, directed the service to develop a small anti-submarine craft that could be turned out quickly in civilian boatyards, leaving the major shipyards clear for destroyers and capital ships.

Albert Loring Swasey, a naval architect and Naval Reserve lieutenant commander, drew the design. Where most contemporary opinion held that subchasers needed 30 to 40 knots, Swasey argued for seaworthiness over speed and produced a 110-foot triple-screw wooden hull driven by three Standard Motor Construction Company six-cylinder, 220-horsepower gasoline engines — good for 18 knots, with a 1,000-mile range. He shaped the bow after a whaleboat, which he considered the best sea-keeping hull form devised since the Vikings. The wooden construction was deliberate: it spread production across dozens of small boatyards whose craftsmen already knew the material.

Congress provided funding under the Naval Emergency Fund after Germany resumed unrestricted submarine warfare in February 1917 and the United States declared war in April. An initial order of 345 boats grew to 441 hulls delivered by 1919, plus 100 transferred to the French Navy.

=== Construction at the New York Navy Yard ===
SC-25 was laid down and built at the New York Navy Yard in Brooklyn, New York, whose workforce expanded from around 6,000 to 18,000 within a year of America entering the war. The yard turned out 49 SC-1-class chasers in eighteen months, making it one of the largest single sources of the type.

=== Specifications ===
SC-25 displaced 77 tons normally and 85 tons at full load, measured 110 feet (34 m) overall — 105 feet (32 m) between perpendiculars — with a beam of 14 feet 9 inches (4.50 m) and a normal draft of 5 feet 7 inches (1.70 m). Three Standard Motor Construction Company 220-bhp six-cylinder gasoline engines drove three shafts; 2,400 US gallons of fuel gave a cruising range of roughly 1,000 nautical miles at 10 knots, with 18 knots available at full power. A two-cylinder auxiliary engine was fitted for harbour use. Two officers and 25 enlisted men crewed her.

She carried one 3-inch/23-caliber deck gun, two Colt .30-caliber machine guns, and a Y-gun depth charge projector. Earlier plans for a second 3-inch gun aft were set aside in favour of the Y-gun, which gave the chasers a more effective submarine-attack capability.

=== Hydrophone detection equipment ===
Submarine detection was handled by Submarine Signal Company hydrophones, of which three types were in general use aboard SC-1-class boats. The S.C. C Tube was fixed to the port side of the keel forward, with the M.B. Tube opposite it on the starboard side; the K Tube was a triangular towed frame carrying a rubber-encased microphone at each corner, thrown over the side and allowed to drift clear on a float cable.

The fixed tubes were preferred during daylight, when they could be deployed and recovered quickly; the K Tube came into its own at night or when the vessel was lying dead in the water. A listener wearing earphones rotated the device until the sound of a submarine's machinery was equal in both ears, giving a bearing. No single chaser could fix a position alone, so the boats worked in groups of three, with each vessel establishing its own bearing and exchanging the data by radio-telephone to triangulate the target before attacking with depth charges.

== Service history ==
=== Commissioning and wartime service ===
Commissioned on 16 October 1917, SC-25 was among the first SC-1-class boats to enter service; the lead vessel of the class had been launched on 7 May that year. Her crew, like those of most chasers, were drawn heavily from Naval Reserve volunteers — many of them college men from Harvard, Princeton, Yale, and other universities — who had little sea time but proved quick to master the hydrophone gear and the radio-telephone equipment the class depended on.

New York Navy Yard boats commissioned in October 1917, including nearby USS SC-20, went to the Third Naval District for coastal patrol. Working in three-boat hunting groups, they swept harbour approaches and coastal lanes, listening for U-boats on the hydrophones and watching a copper trailing-wire antenna for signals. The type covered roughly ten times more sea area per dollar than a destroyer, which made the chasers an unexpectedly economical part of the coastal defence screen.

Of the 441 SC-1-class hulls completed, 121 went to European waters, operating from Plymouth, Queenstown, Brest, Gibraltar, the Azores, and Corfu; the rest, including the Third Naval District boats, held the American coastline. The class was confirmed in only one or two U-boat kills, but their patrols pushed submarines farther offshore and disrupted attack patterns, a contribution that is difficult to quantify but widely acknowledged.

=== Post-Armistice: clearance of the North Sea Mine Barrage ===
The North Sea Mine Barrage — some 70,000 mines strung between Scotland and Norway to pen U-boats inside the North Sea — did not stop being dangerous when the war ended on 11 November 1918. The fields sat across some of the busiest commercial routes in the world, and unless they were swept before winter 1919 closed in, North Sea trade could not safely resume.

On 7 February 1919 Rear Admiral William S. Sims, commanding U.S. Naval Forces in Europe, ordered 20 submarine chasers to Inverness, Scotland, to form part of the minesweeping force. Nineteen had arrived by 1 March — among them three that had recently toured Norway as exhibition vessels and had made a strong impression — and all underwent practice sweeping with dummy mines in the notoriously rough northern waters before the flotilla headed for the barrage.

Rear Admiral Joseph Strauss assembled the overall force: 36 minesweepers, 24 submarine chasers, 20 British Admiralty trawlers, repair ships, an oiler, tugs — more than 4,000 men. The first expedition put to sea on 29 April 1919 with six sweepers and six chasers, cut a passage from Inverness to Kirkwall in the Orkney Islands, and cleared 225 mines in two days. Kirkwall became the operating base for the seven sweeping operations that followed through September 1919.

Wooden hulls suited the work well: steel ships could detonate the barrage's magnetic antenna mines by electromagnetic induction; wood offered no such hazard. The chasers' job was to shoot to the surface any mines whose mooring cables the sweep wires had cut, sink them by gunfire, and lay dan buoys to mark the cleared lanes. It was unpleasant duty: mine explosions sprung seams, knocked engines off their mountings, and shattered fittings. At least one chaser was lost entirely when a mine detonated beneath her hull, splitting the bottom and throwing all three of her 6,300-pound engines clear.

SC-25 was at Kirkwall with the minesweeping force during this period; a photograph in the cruise book Sweeping the North Sea Mine Barrage shows her moored alongside USS Eider (Minesweeper No. 17) at a North Sea port — probably Kirkwall, per the Naval History and Heritage Command — with SC-45, SC-356, SC-47, and SC-40 alongside. Strauss declared the sweep complete on 30 September 1919, though by most estimates only about 40 percent of the original 70,000 mines had been physically swept — the remainder having sunk, broken free of their moorings, or detonated prematurely during the war.

=== Reclassification and disposal ===
The U.S. Navy's hull classification overhaul of 17 July 1920 redesignated her SC-25 — dropping the Submarine Chaser No. 25 title she had carried since commissioning.

The Navy had little use for the chasers in peacetime, and by 1921 was openly describing them as boats it was selling "to save the Government cost of maintaining them in idleness." A Sale of Navy Vessels catalogue listed possible uses — yachts, fishing craft, fire and police boats, tugs, pilot boats, ferries — and buyers moved quickly.

SC-25 was sold on 24 June 1921 to Joseph G. Hitner of Philadelphia, Pennsylvania, president of Henry A. Hitner's Sons Company, a Philadelphia firm with a long record of buying retired government vessels. Several other SC-1-class chasers, among them SC-77, changed hands to the same company on the same date, suggesting that Hitner bought a batch at auction rather than a single hull.

== See also ==
- SC-1 class submarine chaser
- North Sea Mine Barrage
- USS Eider (AM-17)
- Joseph G. Hitner
- New York Navy Yard
