= USS Eider =

Minesweeper of the United States Navy

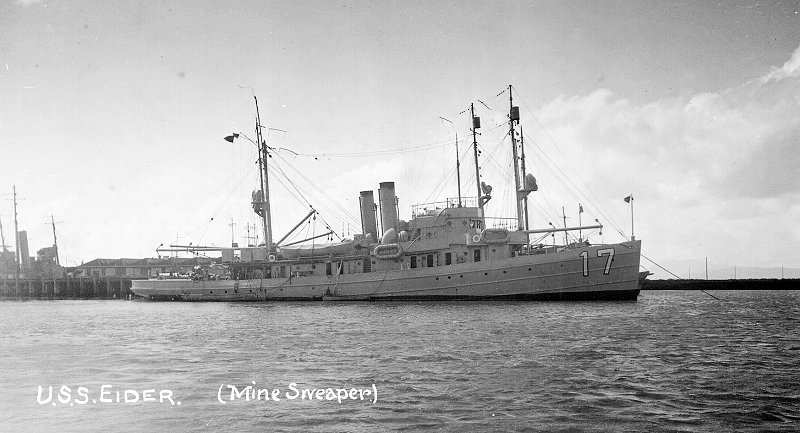
- USS Eider (AM-17) at Mare Island Navy Yard, Vallejo, California, ca. August–September 1920

History

United States
- Name: USS Eider
- Builder: Pusey and Jones Co., Wilmington, Delaware
- Laid down: 25 September 1917
- Launched: 26 May 1918
- Commissioned: 23 January 1919, as Minesweeper No.17
- Decommissioned: 18 April 1922
- In service: 1941
- Out of service: 1947
- Reclassified: AM-17, 17 July 1920; YNG-20 (Gate Craft), 7 October 1940
- Fate: Transferred to the United States Maritime Commission for disposal, 1 July 1947

General characteristics
- Class & type: Lapwing-class minesweeper
- Displacement: 840 long tons (853 t)
- Length: 187 ft 10 in (57.25 m)
- Beam: 35 ft 6 in (10.82 m)
- Draft: 9 ft 10 in (3.00 m)
- Propulsion: Triple expansion reciprocating steam engine; 2 × Babcock & Wilcox boilers; 1 shaft
- Speed: 14 knots (26 km/h; 16 mph)
- Complement: 72
- Armament: 2 × 3 in (76 mm) guns; 2 × machine guns

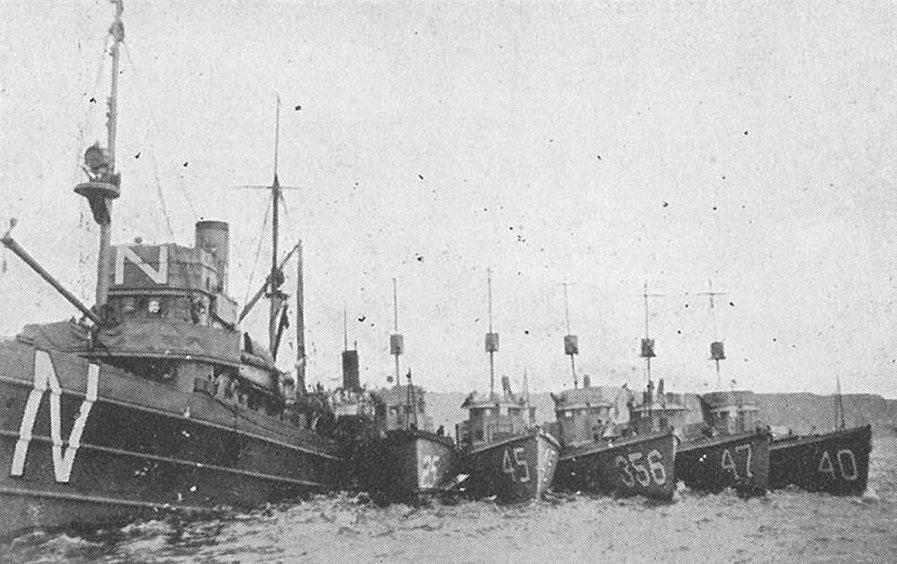
USS Eider (Minesweeper No. 17) (left), bearing the identification marking "N", with (left to right) Submarine Chaser No. 25, Submarine Chaser No. 45, Submarine Chaser No. 356, Submarine Chaser No. 47, and Submarine Chaser No. 40 alongside in a North Sea port (probably Kirkwall in the Orkney Islands) during the clearance of the North Sea Mine Barrage in 1919.

USS Eider (AM-17) was a Lapwing-class minesweeper of the United States Navy.

Laid down on 25 September 1917 by the Pusey and Jones Company of Wilmington, Delaware, Eider was launched on 26 May 1918, and commissioned as USS Eider, (Minesweeper No.17) on 23 January 1919.

== Post-World War I Operations ==
Eider sailed out of Philadelphia, Pennsylvania, for minesweeping operations in the Delaware River approaches until 8 March 1919, then put into Norfolk, Virginia, to prepare for distant service. On 3 April 1919 she departed for Scotland and alternately based on Kirkwall and Invergordon, Orkney Islands, swept the vast North Sea minefield. Eider was on hand to assist in the rescue of USS Pelican (AM-27) when Pelican was gravely damaged by an exploding mine on 9 July 1919. Returning home in October she called at Brest, Lisbon, the Azores and Bermuda.

Arriving at Charleston Navy Yard on 1 December 1919 Eider was placed in reduced commission for repairs. On 29 May 1920 she joined Penguin (AM-33) in salvage operations on Widgeon (AM-22). Placed in full commission again for passage to Mare Island, California, Eider sailed from Norfolk, Virginia, 10 July 1920 and arrived on 28 August to report to Commander, Train, Base Force. On 10 September she was again placed in reduced commission with a partial complement.

== Pacific Theatre operations ==
In 1921 Eider's homeport was changed to Pearl Harbor, where she arrived on 18 June. She was decommissioned on 18 April 1922, laid up until 1937, and finally sent back to Mare Island, California, still in decommissioned status. In 1940 she was converted for duty as a gate tender and reclassified YNG-20 on 7 October 1940. Placed in service in 1941, based on the Naval Net Depot, Tiburon, she operated with net tenders in San Francisco Bay throughout World War II.

== Fate ==
Eider was transferred to the United States Maritime Commission for disposal on 1 July 1947.
