= SC3 =

SC3 may refer to:

- South Carolina's 3rd congressional district
- South Carolina Highway 3, a state highway in South Carolina
- Santa Clause 3: The Escape Clause, a 2006 American film that is third in the Santa Clause movie series
- SC3, a spin-off pop-group, made of 3 original members of S Club 7
- Secret Chiefs 3, an avant-garde/experimental instrumental rock music group
- USS SC-3, a United States Navy submarine chaser commissioned in 1918 and sold in 1920
- SC3, a candidate phylum of bacteria from arid soil
- SC03, a FIPS 10-4 region code, see List of FIPS region codes (S–U)
- SC-03, a subdivision code for the Seychelles, see ISO 3166-2:SC

== Video games ==
- Soul Calibur III, a PlayStation 2 fighting game produced by Namco
- Star Control 3, a video game developed by Legend Entertainment
- SimCity 3000, a city-building simulation personal computer game and the third major installment in the SimCity series
- Tom Clancy's Splinter Cell: Chaos Theory, a third-person stealth-based video game also known as Splinter Cell 3
