= SC 39 =

SC 39 or variants may refer to:

- South Carolina Highway 39
- USS SC-39 - USS Submarine Chaser No. 39
- Scandium-39 (Sc-39 or ^{39}Sc), an isotope of scandium
