= USS SC-2 =

US WW1 submarine chaser

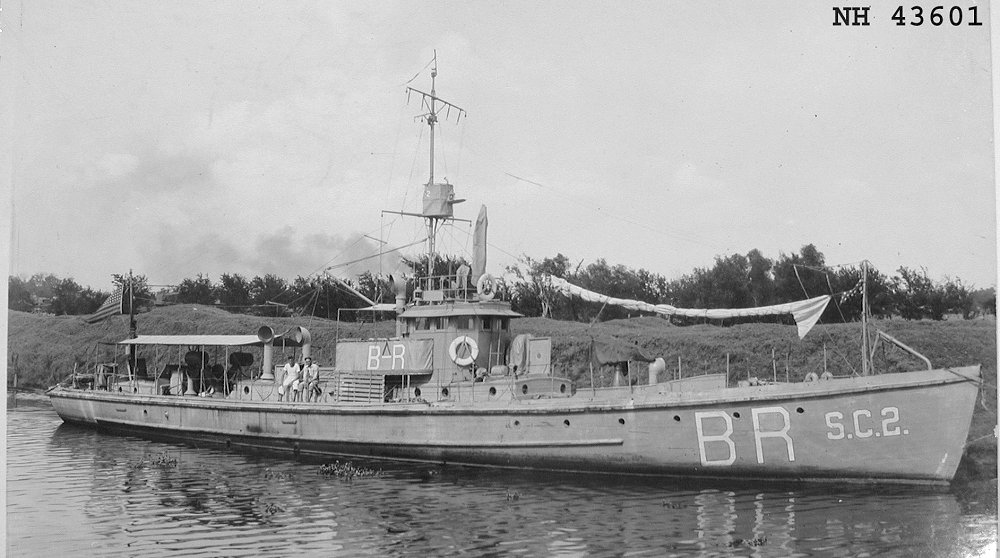
- USS S.C. 2 during World War I. The "BR" painted on her hull and superstructure is a convoy station marking.

History

United States
- Name: USS Submarine Chaser No. 2 (1918-1920); USS SC-2 (1920-1930)
- Builder: Naval Station New Orleans, New Orleans, Louisiana
- Commissioned: 8 January 1918
- Reclassified: SC-2 on 17 July 1920
- Fate: Sold 29 October 1930

General characteristics
- Class & type: SC-1-class submarine chaser
- Displacement: 77 tons normal; 85 tons full load
- Length: 110 ft (34 m) overall; 105 ft (32 m) between perpendiculars
- Beam: 14 ft 9 in (4.50 m)
- Draft: 5 ft 7 in (1.70 m) normal; 6 ft 6 in (1.98 m) full load
- Propulsion: Three 220 bhp (160 kW) Standard Motor Construction Company six-cylinder gasoline engines, three shafts, 2,400 US gallons (9,100 L) of gasoline; one Standard Motor Construction Company two-cylinder gasoline-powered auxiliary engine
- Speed: 18 knots (33 km/h)
- Range: 1,000 nautical miles (1,900 km) at 10 knots (19 km/h)
- Complement: 27 (2 officers, 25 enlisted men)
- Sensors & processing systems: One Submarine Signal Company S.C. C Tube, M.B. Tube, or K Tube hydrophone
- Armament: 1 × 3-inch (76.2 mm)/23-caliber gun mount; 2 × Colt .30 caliber (7.62 mm) machine guns; 1 × Y-gun depth charge projector

USS SC-2, until July 1920 known as USS Submarine Chaser No. 2 or USS S.C. 2, was an SC-1-class submarine chaser built for the United States Navy during World War I.

SC-2 was a wooden-hulled 110-foot (34 m) submarine chaser built at Naval Station New Orleans in New Orleans, Louisiana. She was commissioned on 8 January 1918 as USS Submarine Chaser No. 2, abbreviated at the time as USS S.C. 2.

For the time, the ship was under temporary command of Medal of Honor recipient Isadore Nordstrom.

During World War I, S.C. 2 served on antisubmarine patrol duty in the Special Hunting Squadron, USS Salem Group, against German submarines in the Gulf of Mexico, and was based at Key West, Florida.

When the U.S. Navy adopted its modern hull number system on 17 July 1920, Submarine Chaser No. 2 was classified as SC-2 and her name was shortened to USS SC-2.

On 29 October 1930, the Navy sold SC-2 to the City of New Orleans, Louisiana.
