= USS Bellingham =

Cargo ship of the United States Navy

History

United States
- Name: USS Bellingham
- Namesake: Previous name (for Bellingham, Washington) retained
- Builder: Todd Dry Dock and Construction Company, Tacoma, Washington
- Launched: 28 September 1918
- Completed: 24 October 1918
- Acquired: 1918
- Commissioned: 30 October 1918
- Decommissioned: 10 May 1919
- Stricken: 10 May 1919
- Fate: Transferred to U.S. Shipping Board 10 May 1919
- Notes: In U.S. Shipping Board service as SS Bellingham 1919-1923; Sold to Soviet Union sometime between 1929 and 1932, became SS Nevastroi

General characteristics
- Type: Cargo ship
- Displacement: 10,690 long tons (10,862 t) normal
- Length: 396 ft 0 in (120.70 m)
- Beam: 53 ft 0 in (16.15 m)
- Draft: 23 ft 8 in (7.21 m) mean
- Propulsion: One 2,500-indicated horsepower (1,864-megawatt) steam engine, one shaft
- Speed: 10.5 knots (19.4 km/h; 12.1 mph)
- Complement: 60

Soviet Union
- Name: SS Nevastroi
- Namesake: Russian for "Neva Builders," a Soviet tribute to shipbuilders along the Neva River
- Operator: Far East Shipping Company
- Acquired: Sometime between 1929 and 1932
- Fate: Possibly sunk 16 August 1945
- Notes: Deleted from merchant registry 1959-1960

USS Bellingham (ID-3552) was a United States Navy cargo ship in commission from 1918 to 1919. She later served the government of the Soviet Union as SS Nevastroi for many years.

== Construction, acquisition, and commissioning ==
Bellingham was laid down as the commercial steel-hulled, single-screw, steam cargo ship SS War Herald for the United States Shipping Board by the Todd Dry Dock and Construction Company at Tacoma, Washington. She was renamed SS Bellingham and was completed in August 1918. The Shipping Board transferred her to the U.S. Navy for use during World War I; the Navy assigned her the naval registry identification number 3552 and commissioned her on 30 October 1918 at the Puget Sound Navy Yard in Bremerton, Washington, as USS Bellingham (ID-3552).

== Operational history ==
Assigned to the Naval Overseas Transportation Service to operate under a United States Army account, Bellingham departed for San Diego, California, on the morning of 4 November 1918. After a brief stop there on 10 November 1918, the day before the Armistice with Germany brought World War I to an end, she proceeded to Arica, Chile, where she arrived on 28 November 1918. Shifting to Iquique, Chile, on 29 November 1918, she loaded a cargo of nitrates before departing on the morning of 6 December 1918. Reaching Balboa in the Panama Canal Zone on the Pacific Ocean side of the Isthmus of Panama on 15 December 1918, she transited the Panama Canal that day and left Cristóbal on the Caribbean Sea side of the canal the same evening bound for Jacksonville, Florida. She reached Jacksonville on 22 December 1918 and discharged her cargo there.

Bellingham got underway from Jacksonville on 10 January 1919 and steamed up the United States East Coast to Charleston, South Carolina, where she arrived on the evening of 11 January 1919. Loading a cargo of 5,577 tons of steel and cotton, she left Charleston on 15 February 1919 bound for France. Upon arrival at Le Havre, France, on 6 March 1919, however, she discovered that congestion of the port facilities there would have made it impossible to be assigned a berth for almost two weeks. Ordered to proceed instead to Cherbourg, France, she got underway on the afternoon of 8 March 1919, and reached Cherbourg early on the morning of 9 March 1919. There, she unloaded her cargo before returning to Le Havre on 16 March 1919.

Underway from Le Havre on 6 April 1919, Bellingham arrived at Cardiff, Wales, on 8 April 1919. She embarked 26 sailors there for passage home to the United States and departed in ballast on 15 April 1919. She reached the Quarantine Station off Staten Island in New York City late on the evening of 25 April 1919. Cleared at the station, she anchored off Tompkinsville, Staten Island, on the morning of 26 April 1919 and transferred her passengers to the submarine chaser USS SC-49. Sent thence to discharge ballast, Bellingham moored alongside Pier 46, North River, at 17:47 hours on 30 April and was placed in line for demobilization. She shifted briefly to a drydock in Brooklyn, New York, before being decommissioned.

== Decommissioning and later U.S. commercial career ==
Bellingham was decommissioned on 10 May 1919 and was stricken from the Navy List and transferred her back to the U.S. Shipping Board the same day. Once again SS Bellingham, she operated commercially under the control of the Shipping Board until she was laid up on 24 July 1923 at Fort Eustis, Virginia.

== Soviet career as SS Nevastroi ==
Sometime between 1929 and 1932, Bellingham was among 29 surplus Shipping Board ships sold to the government of the Soviet Union. Renamed Nevastroi, she initially was based at Leningrad and later at Vladivostok as a ship of the Soviet government's Far East Shipping Company. In the late 1930s, Nevastroi became notorious as one of the Soviet dictator Joseph Stalin's "slave ships" carrying Soviet political prisoners to the Kolyma Gulag in the far northeastern part of Siberia. During World War II she served on Lend-Lease duty in the Pacific Ocean, and underwent an overhaul in the United States.

The Soviet Union's penchant for secrecy has obscured Nevastroi's ultimate fate; She was damaged and probably sunk after hitting a naval mine on 16 August 1945. Her name disappeared from Lloyd's Register of Shipping beginning with the 1959-1960 edition.
