= USS SC-35 =

Submarine chaser

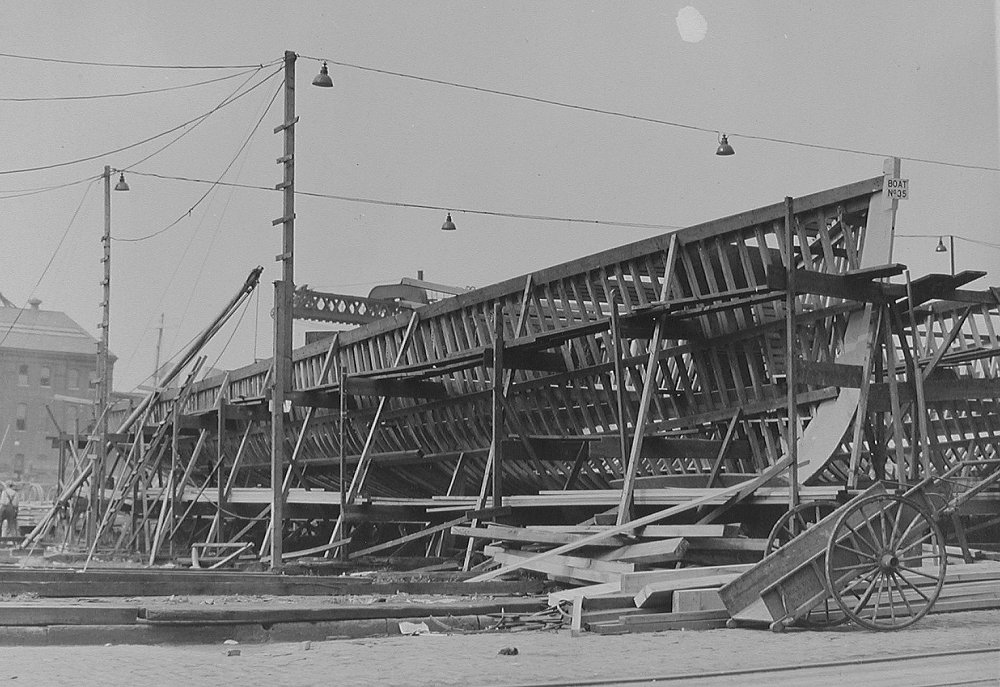
- Submarine Chaser No. 35 under construction at the New York Navy Yard in Brooklyn, New York, on 15 September 1917.

History

United States
- Name: USS Submarine Chaser No. 35 (1917-1920); USS SC-35 (1920-1921)
- Builder: New York Navy Yard, Brooklyn, New York
- Commissioned: 23 January 1918
- Reclassified: SC-35 on 17 July 1920
- Fate: Sold 24 June 1921

General characteristics
- Class & type: SC-1-class submarine chaser
- Displacement: 77 tons normal; 85 tons full load
- Length: 110 ft (34 m) overall; 105 ft (32 m) between perpendiculars
- Beam: 14 ft 9 in (4.50 m)
- Draft: 5 ft 7 in (1.70 m) normal; 6 ft 6 in (1.98 m) full load
- Propulsion: Three 220 bhp (160 kW) Standard Motor Construction Company six-cylinder gasoline engines, three shafts, 2,400 US gallons (9,100 L) of gasoline; one Standard Motor Construction Company two-cylinder gasoline-powered auxiliary engine
- Speed: 18 knots (33 km/h)
- Range: 1,000 nautical miles (1,900 km) at 10 knots (19 km/h)
- Complement: 27 (2 officers, 25 enlisted men)
- Sensors & processing systems: One Submarine Signal Company S.C. C Tube, M.B. Tube, or K Tube hydrophone
- Armament: 1 × 3-inch (76.2 mm)/23-caliber gun mount; 2 × Colt .30 caliber (7.62 mm) machine guns; 1 × Y-gun depth charge projector

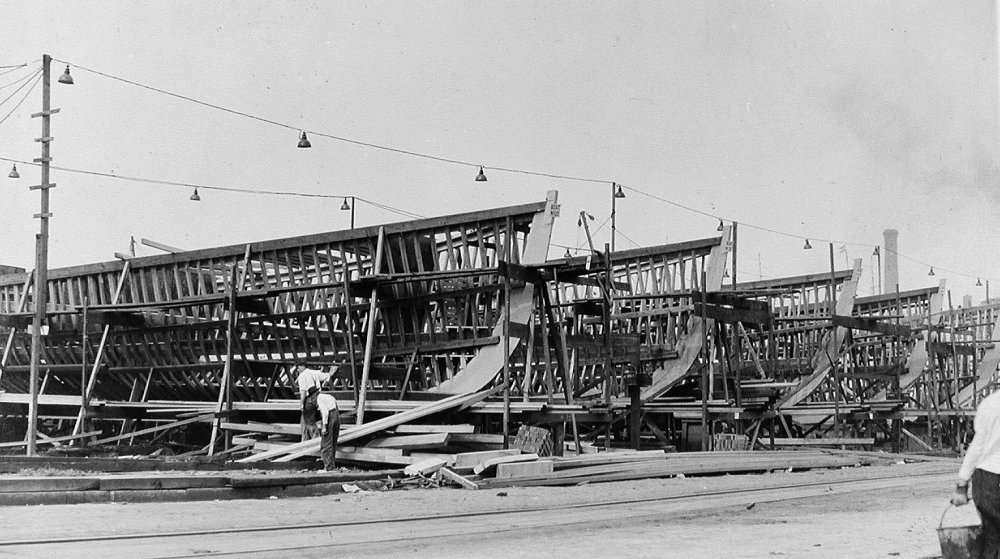
Submarine Chaser No. 35 is at left in this 15 September 1917 photograph of SC-1-class submarine chasers under construction at the New York Navy Yard in Brooklyn, New York.

USS SC-35, until July 1920 known as USS Submarine Chaser No. 35 or USS S.C. 35, was an SC-1-class submarine chaser built for the United States Navy during World War I.

SC-35 was a wooden-hulled 110-foot (34 m) submarine chaser built at the New York Navy Yard at Brooklyn, New York in 1917. She was commissioned on 23 January 1918 as USS Submarine Chaser No. 35, abbreviated at the time as USS S.C. 35. She sailed for overseas service on April 25, 1918.

When the U.S. Navy adopted its modern hull number system on 17 July 1920, Submarine Chaser No. 35 was classified as SC-35 and her name was shortened to USS SC-35.

On 24 June 1921, the Navy sold SC-35 to Joseph G. Hitner of Philadelphia, Pennsylvania.
