= USS SC-37 =

US Navy anti-submarine warfare ship

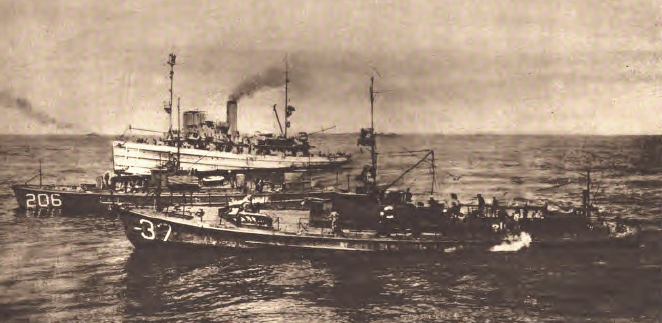
- Submarine Chaser No. 37 (foreground) operating with Submarine Chaser No. 206 (center) and a minesweeper (background) in the North Sea in 1919 during minesweeping operations to clear the North Sea Mine Barrage after World War I.

History

United States
- Name: USS Submarine Chaser No. 37 (1917-1920); USS SC-37 (1920-1921)
- Builder: New York Navy Yard, Brooklyn, New York
- Commissioned: 1 February 1918
- Reclassified: SC-37 on 17 July 1920
- Fate: Sold 24 June 1921

General characteristics
- Class & type: SC-1-class submarine chaser
- Displacement: 77 tons normal; 85 tons full load
- Length: 110 ft (34 m) overall; 105 ft (32 m) between perpendiculars
- Beam: 14 ft 9 in (4.50 m)
- Draft: 5 ft 7 in (1.70 m) normal; 6 ft 6 in (1.98 m) full load
- Propulsion: Three 220 bhp (160 kW) Standard Motor Construction Company six-cylinder gasoline engines, three shafts, 2,400 US gallons (9,100 L) of gasoline; one Standard Motor Construction Company two-cylinder gasoline-powered auxiliary engine
- Speed: 18 knots (33 km/h)
- Range: 1,000 nautical miles (1,900 km) at 10 knots (19 km/h)
- Complement: 27 (2 officers, 25 enlisted men)
- Sensors & processing systems: One Submarine Signal Company S.C. C Tube, M.B. Tube, or K Tube hydrophone
- Armament: 1 × 3-inch (76.2 mm)/23-caliber gun mount; 2 × Colt .30 caliber (7.62 mm) machine guns; 1 × Y-gun depth charge projector

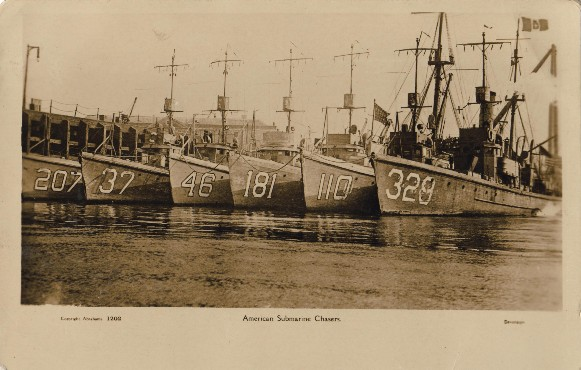
A picture postcard of the United States Navy submarine chasers (left to right) S.C. 207, S.C. 37, S.C. 46, S.C. 181, S.C. 110, and S.C. 329, probably during their participation in the 1919 North Sea minesweeping operations to clear the North Sea Mine Barrage after World War I.

USS SC-37, until July 1920 known as USS Submarine Chaser No. 37 or USS S.C. 37, was an SC-1-class submarine chaser built for the United States Navy during World War I.

SC-37 was a wooden-hulled 110-foot (34 m) submarine chaser built at the New York Navy Yard at Brooklyn, New York. She was commissioned on 1 February 1918 as USS Submarine Chaser No. 37, abbreviated at the time as USS S.C. 37.

In 1919, Submarine Chaser No. 37 participated in North Sea minesweeping operations to clear the North Sea Mine Barrage.

When the U.S. Navy adopted its modern hull number system on 17 July 1920, Submarine Chaser No. 37 was classified as SC-37 and her name was shortened to USS SC-37.

On 24 June 1921, the Navy sold SC-37 to Joseph G. Hitner of Philadelphia, Pennsylvania.
