= USS SC-18 =

US Navy anti-submarine warfare ship

History

United States
- Name: USS Submarine Chaser No. 18 (1917-1920); USS SC-18 (1920)
- Builder: New York Navy Yard, Brooklyn, New York
- Commissioned: 10 November 1917
- Reclassified: SC-18 on 17 July 1920
- Fate: Transferred to U.S. Department of War 1920

General characteristics
- Class & type: SC-1-class submarine chaser
- Displacement: 77 tons normal; 85 tons full load
- Length: 110 ft (34 m) overall; 105 ft (32 m) between perpendiculars
- Beam: 14 ft 9 in (4.50 m)
- Draft: 5 ft 7 in (1.70 m) normal; 6 ft 6 in (1.98 m) full load
- Propulsion: Three 220 bhp (160 kW) Standard Motor Construction Company six-cylinder gasoline engines, three shafts, 2,400 US gallons (9,100 L) of gasoline; one Standard Motor Construction Company two-cylinder gasoline-powered auxiliary engine
- Speed: 18 knots (33 km/h)
- Range: 1,000 nautical miles (1,900 km) at 10 knots (19 km/h)
- Complement: 27 (2 officers, 25 enlisted men)
- Sensors & processing systems: One Submarine Signal Company S.C. C Tube, M.B. Tube, or K Tube hydrophone
- Armament: 1 × 3-inch (76.2 mm)/23-caliber gun mount; 2 × Colt .30 caliber (7.62 mm) machine guns; 1 × Y-gun depth charge projector

USS SC-18, until July 1920 known as USS Submarine Chaser No. 18 or USS S.C. 18, was an SC-1-class submarine chaser built for the United States Navy during World War I.

SC-18 was a wooden-hulled 110-foot (34 m) submarine chaser built at the New York Navy Yard at Brooklyn, New York. She was commissioned on 10 November 1917 as USS Submarine Chaser No. 18, abbreviated at the time as USS S.C. 18.

When the U.S. Navy adopted its modern hull number system on 17 July 1920, Submarine Chaser No. 18 was classified as SC-18 and her name was shortened to USS SC-18.

Sometime in 1920, the Navy transferred SC-18 to the United States Department of War for service with the United States Army.
