= USS SC-49 =

Submarine chaser of USA

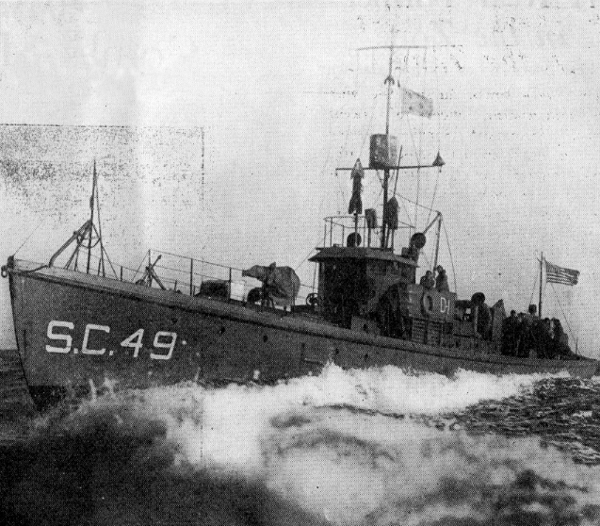

History

United States
- Name: USS Submarine Chaser No. 49 (1918-1920); USS SC-49 (1920-1920)
- Builder: New York Navy Yard, Brooklyn, New York
- Commissioned: 27 March 1918
- Renamed: USS SC-49 17 July 1920
- Fate: Sold 24 June 1921

General characteristics
- Class & type: SC-1-class submarine chaser
- Displacement: 77 tons normal; 85 tons full load
- Length: 110 ft (34 m) overall; 105 ft (32 m) between perpendiculars
- Beam: 14 ft 9 in (4.50 m)
- Draft: 5 ft 7 in (1.70 m) normal; 6 ft 6 in (1.98 m) full load
- Propulsion: Three 220 bhp (160 kW) Standard Motor Construction Company six-cylinder gasoline engines, three shafts, 2,400 US gallons (9,100 L) of gasoline; one Standard Motor Construction Company two-cylinder gasoline-powered auxiliary engine
- Speed: 18 knots (33 km/h)
- Range: 1,000 nautical miles (1,900 km) at 10 knots (19 km/h)
- Complement: 27 (2 officers, 25 enlisted men)
- Sensors & processing systems: One Submarine Signal Company S.C. C Tube, M.B. Tube, or K Tube hydrophone
- Armament: 1 × 3-inch (76.2 mm)/23-caliber gun mount; 2 × Colt .30 caliber (7.62 mm) machine guns; 1 × Y-gun depth charge projector

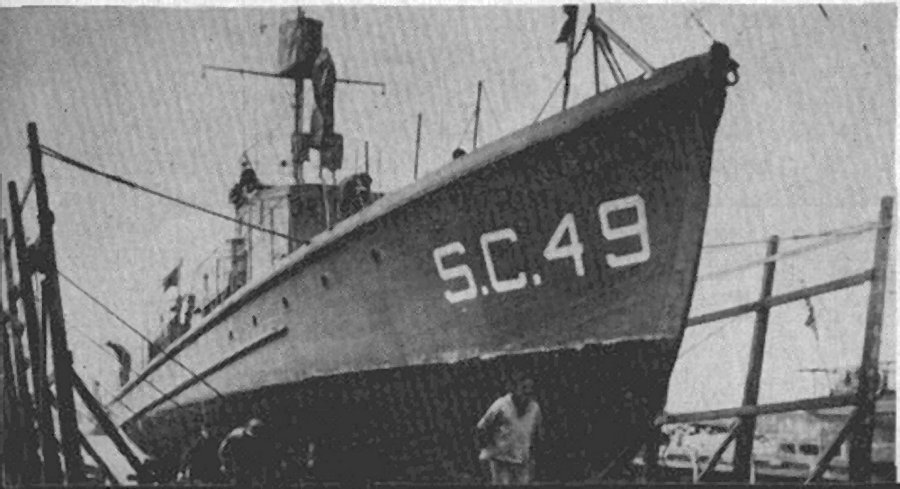
USS SC-49 hauled out of the water.

USS SC-49, prior to July 1920 known as USS Submarine Chaser No. 49 and USS S.C. 49, was an SC-1-class submarine chaser built for the United States Navy during the First World War.

== Construction and commissioning ==
SC-49 was a wooden-hulled 110-foot (34 m) submarine chaser built at the New York Navy Yard in Brooklyn, New York, and was commissioned on 27 March 1918 as USS Submarine Chaser No. 49, abbreviated at the time as USS S.C. 49.

== Service history ==
On 26 April 1919, 26 sailors who had traveled as passengers from Cardiff, Wales, and arrived the previous evening at New York City aboard the cargo ship USS Bellingham (ID-3552) transferred from Bellingham to S.C. 49 while Bellingham was at anchor off Tompkinsville, Staten Island.

When the U.S. Navy adopted its modern hull number system on 17 July 1920, Submarine Chaser No. 49 was classified as SC-49 and her name was shortened to USS SC-49.

On 24 June 1921, the Navy sold SC-49 to Joseph G. Hitner of Philadelphia, Pennsylvania for his private boat firm.
