= USS SC-38 =

US Navy anti-submarine warfare ship

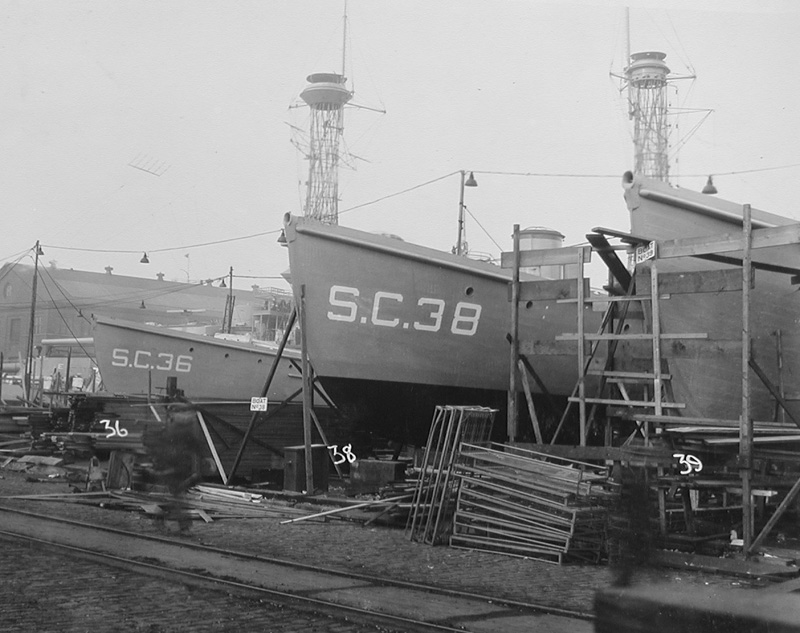
- Submarine Chaser No. 38 is in the center in this 27 November 1917 photograph of SC-1-class submarine chasers under construction at the New York Navy Yard in Brooklyn, New York. At left is Submarine Chaser No. 36, and the bow of Submarine Chaser No. 39 is at right.

History

United States
- Name: USS Submarine Chaser No. 38 (1917-1919); USS SC-38 (retrospectively since 1920)
- Builder: New York Navy Yard, Brooklyn, New York
- Commissioned: 1 February 1918
- Fate: Sold December 1919

General characteristics
- Class & type: SC-1-class submarine chaser
- Displacement: 77 tons normal; 85 tons full load
- Length: 110 ft (34 m) overall; 105 ft (32 m) between perpendiculars
- Beam: 14 ft 9 in (4.50 m)
- Draft: 5 ft 7 in (1.70 m) normal; 6 ft 6 in (1.98 m) full load
- Propulsion: Three 220 bhp (160 kW) Standard Motor Construction Company six-cylinder gasoline engines, three shafts, 2,400 US gallons (9,100 L) of gasoline; one Standard Motor Construction Company two-cylinder gasoline-powered auxiliary engine
- Speed: 18 knots (33 km/h)
- Range: 1,000 nautical miles (1,900 km) at 10 knots (19 km/h)
- Complement: 27 (2 officers, 25 enlisted men)
- Sensors & processing systems: One Submarine Signal Company S.C. C Tube, M.B. Tube, or K Tube hydrophone
- Armament: 1 × 3-inch (76.2 mm)/23-caliber gun mount; 2 × Colt .30 caliber (7.62 mm) machine guns; 1 × Y-gun depth charge projector

USS SC-38, during her service life known as USS Submarine Chaser No. 38 or USS S.C. 38, was an SC-1-class submarine chaser built for the United States Navy during World War I.

== Construction and commissioning ==
SC-38 was a wooden-hulled 110-foot (34 m) submarine chaser built at the New York Navy Yard at Brooklyn, New York. She was commissioned on 1 February 1918 as USS Submarine Chaser No. 38, abbreviated at the time as USS S.C. 38.

== Service history ==
In 1919, Submarine Chaser No. 38 participated in North Sea minesweeping operations to clear the North Sea Mine Barrage. During these operations, she struck a mine on 4 September 1919 and was damaged, but suffered no casualties. She was salvaged, and the Navy sold her to Thomas Lee of Ipswich, England, in December 1919.

The U.S. Navy adopted its modern hull number system on 17 July 1920, after Submarine Chaser No. 38 had left Navy service. Had she remained in Navy service at that date, she would have been classified as SC-38 and her name would have been shortened to USS SC-38, and she now is referred to retrospectively by this name.
