= USS SC-1 =

US Navy anti-submarine warfare ship

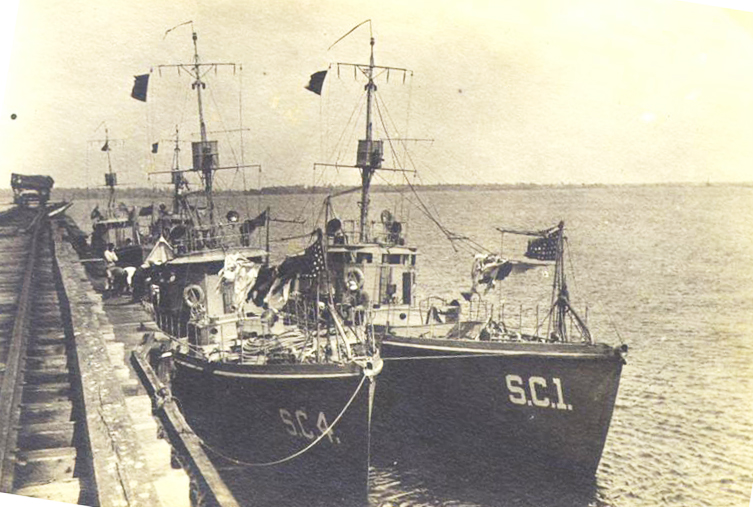
- USS S.C. 1 (right) and her sister ship USS S.C. 4 (left) at Charleston, South Carolina.

History

United States
- Name: USS Submarine Chaser No. 1 (1917-1920); USS SC-1 (1920-1921)
- Builder: Naval Station New Orleans, New Orleans, Louisiana
- Commissioned: 1 or 8 October 1917
- Reclassified: SC-1 on 17 July 1920
- Fate: Sold 20 July 1921

General characteristics
- Class & type: SC-1-class submarine chaser
- Displacement: 77 tons normal; 85 tons full load
- Length: 110 ft (34 m) overall; 105 ft (32 m) between perpendiculars
- Beam: 14 ft 9 in (4.50 m)
- Draft: 5 ft 7 in (1.70 m) normal; 6 ft 6 in (1.98 m) full load
- Propulsion: Three 220-brake horsepower (164-kilowatt) Standard Motor Construction Company ix-cylinder gasoline engines, three shafts, 2,400 US gallons (9,100 L) of gasoline; one Standard Motor Construction Company two-cylinder gasoline-powered auxiliary engine
- Speed: 18 knots (33 km/h)
- Range: 1,000 nautical miles (1,850 km) at 10 knots (19 km/h)
- Complement: 27 (2 officers, 25 enlisted men)
- Sensors & processing systems: One Submarine Signal Company S.C. C Tube, M.B. Tube, or K Tube hydrophone
- Armament: 1 × 3-inch (76.2-mm)/23-caliber gun mount; 2 × Colt .30 caliber (7.62-mm) machine gun; 1 × Y-gun depth charge projector

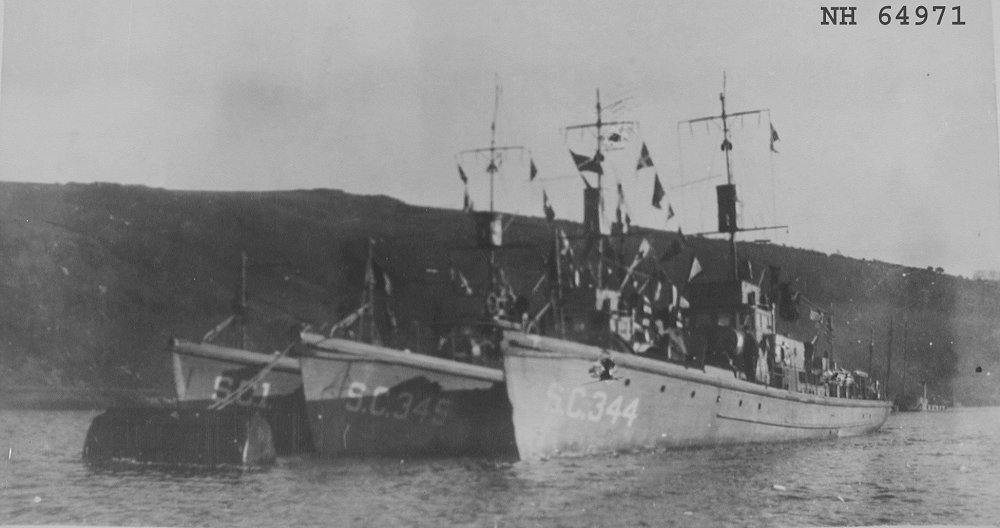
USS S.C. 1 (left) and her sister ships USS S.C. 345 (center) and USS S.C. 344 (right) moored to a buoy at Salcombe, England, during World War I.

USS SC-1, before July 1920 known as USS Submarine Chaser No. 1 or USS S.C. 1, was an SC-1-class submarine chaser built for the United States Navy during World War I.

SC-1 was a wooden-hulled 110-foot (34 m) submarine chaser built at Naval Station New Orleans in New Orleans, Louisiana. She was commissioned on either 1 or 8 October 1917 as USS Submarine Chaser No. 1, abbreviated at the time as USS S.C. 1.

During World War I, S.C. 1 was based at Base 27, Plymouth, England, from which she conducted antisubmarine patrols against German submarines as a part of Unit 1 with the submarine chasers S.C. 344 and USS S.C. 345.

When the U.S. Navy adopted its modern hull number system on 17 July 1920, Submarine Chaser No. 1 was classified as SC-1 and her name was shortened to USS SC-1.

On 20 July 1921, the Navy sold SC-1 to Henry A. Hitner's Sons Company of Philadelphia, Pennsylvania.

== External sources ==
- Woofenden, Todd A. Hunters of the Steel Sharks: The Submarine Chasers of World War I. Bowdoinham, Maine: Signal Light Books, 2006. ISBN 978-0-9789192-0-7.
