= USS SC-27 =

US Navy anti-submarine warfare ship

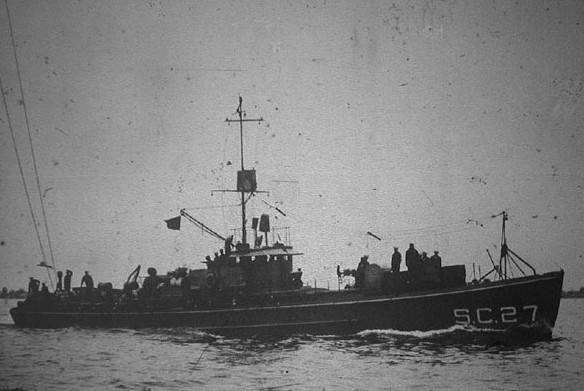
- Submarine Chaser No. 27 on 1 July 1918.

History

United States
- Name: USS Submarine Chaser No. 27 (1917-1919); USS SC-27 (retrospectively since 1920)
- Builder: New York Navy Yard, Brooklyn, New York
- Commissioned: 8 November 1917
- Fate: Transferred to U.S. Coast Guard 13 or 14 November 1919

United States
- Name: USCGC Richards
- Namesake: A crew member of the Coast Guard Cutter USCGC Tampa killed in her sinking in 1918
- Acquired: 13 or 14 November 1919
- Fate: Sold 29 January 1923

General characteristics
- Class & type: SC-1-class submarine chaser
- Displacement: 77 tons normal; 85 tons full load
- Length: 110 ft (34 m) overall; 105 ft (32 m) between perpendiculars
- Beam: 14 ft 9 in (4.50 m)
- Draft: 5 ft 7 in (1.70 m) normal; 6 ft 6 in (1.98 m) full load
- Propulsion: Three 220 bhp (160 kW) Standard Motor Construction Company six-cylinder gasoline engines, three shafts, 2,400 US gallons (9,100 L) of gasoline; one Standard Motor Construction Company two-cylinder gasoline-powered auxiliary engine
- Speed: 18 knots (33 km/h)
- Range: 1,000 nautical miles (1,900 km) at 10 knots (19 km/h)
- Complement: 27 (2 officers, 25 enlisted men)
- Sensors & processing systems: One Submarine Signal Company S.C. C Tube, M.B. Tube, or K Tube hydrophone
- Armament: 1 × 3-inch (76.2 mm)/23-caliber gun mount; 2 × Colt .30 caliber (7.62 mm) machine guns; 1 × Y-gun depth charge projector

USS SC-27, during her service life known as USS Submarine Chaser No. 27 or USS S.C. 27, was an SC-1-class submarine chaser built for the United States Navy during World War I. She later served in the United States Coast Guard as USCGC Richards.

== U.S. Navy service ==
SC-27 was a wooden-hulled 110-foot (34 m) submarine chaser built at the New York Navy Yard at Brooklyn, New York. She was commissioned on 8 November 1917 as USS Submarine Chaser No. 27, abbreviated at the time as USS S.C. 27.

Submarine Chaser No. 27 was transferred to the U.S. Coast Guard on 13 or 14 November 1919 at Norfolk, Virginia.

The U.S. Navy adopted its modern hull number system on 17 July 1920, after Submarine Chaser No. 27 had left Navy service. Had she remained in Navy service at that date, she would have been classified as SC-27 and her name would have been shortened to USS SC-27, and she now is referred to retrospectively by this name.

== U.S. Coast Guard service ==
The Coast Guard commissioned the submarine chaser as USCGC Richards. As of 1 January 1923 she was based at South Baltimore, Maryland.

The Coast Guard found Richards, like other SC-1-class submarine chasers, too expensive to operate and maintain, and sold her on 29 January 1923.
