= Isadore Nordstrom =

Isidore Nordstrom
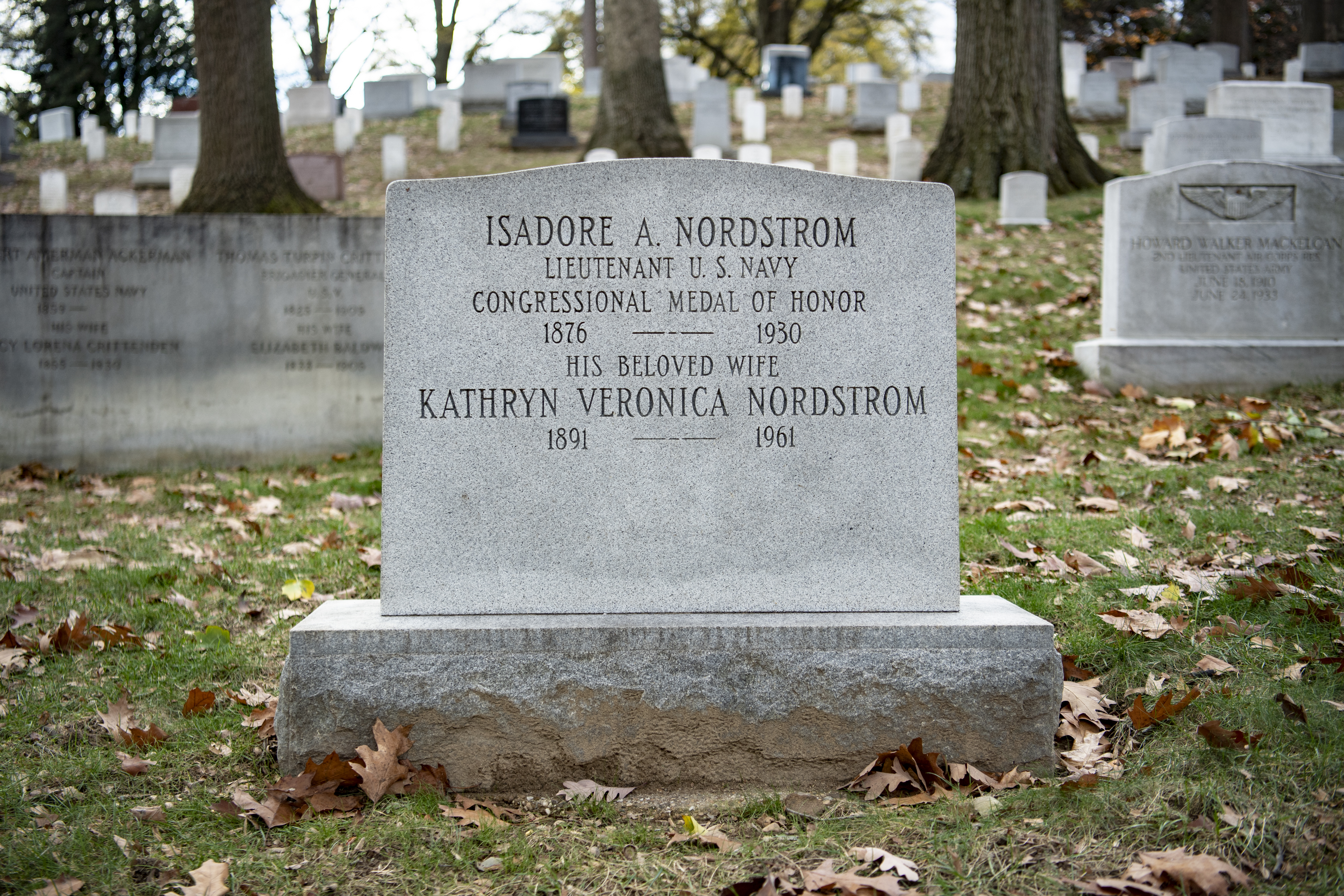
- Grave at Arlington National Cemetery
- Born: May 24, 1876; Gothenburg, Sweden
- Died: March 6, 1930 (aged 53); USS Cincinnati
- Burial place: Arlington National Cemetery
- Military career
- Allegiance: United States
- Branch: United States Navy
- Service years: From circa 1897
- Rank: Lieutenant
- Units: USS New York (ACR-2); USS Kearsarge (BB-5); USS North Dakota (BB-29)
- Conflicts: Battle of Santiago de Cuba
- Awards: Medal of Honor

Isadore Nordstrom (May 24, 1876 – March 6, 1930) (his first name is spelled as "Isidore" in official records) was a United States Navy sailor and a recipient of the United States military's highest decoration, the Medal of Honor.

== Biography ==
=== Early career ===
Born on May 24, 1876, in Gothenburg, Sweden, Nordstrom immigrated to the United States and on August 17, 1897, enlisted in the Navy as an ordinary seaman from the state of New York. He served on the armored cruiser USS New York during the Spanish–American War as part of the West Indies Naval Campaign, including the climactic Battle of Santiago de Cuba.

=== Medal of Honor action ===
By April 13, 1906, he was serving as a chief boatswain's mate on the USS Kearsarge (BB-5). On that day, while the Kearsarge was conducting target practice, powder charges were accidentally ignited in the ship's forward turret, and Nordstrom helped carry out wounded sailors. For these actions, he was awarded the Medal of Honor eighteen years later, on December 4, 1924. His first name was spelled "Isidor" on the citation, this being the correct spelling in Swedish.

Nordstrom's official Medal of Honor citation reads:

For gallant conduct upon the occasion of the disastrous fire of accidentally ignited powder charges, which occurred in the forward turret of USS Kearsarge during target practice on 13 April 1906. Chief Boatswain Nordstrom, then chief boatswain's mate, was among the first to enter the turret in order to assist in bringing out the injured.

=== Later career ===
On February 3, 1908, Nordstrom was appointed to the warrant officer rank of boatswain, after over ten years of service as an enlisted man. He transferred to USS North Dakota (BB-29) in late 1912 before being promoted to chief boatswain on February 3, 1914. He was assigned to the Naval Torpedo Station in Newport, Rhode Island in November 1916.

=== World War I ===
Shortly after the United States' entry into World War I in 1917, he was given a temporary commission as an ensign on July 1, 1917, and was assigned to the former German luxury liner USS Leviathan in September of the same year and served on Leviathan until April 1918. He received a temporary promotion to lieutenant (junior grade) on January 1, 1918.

In May 1918 Nordstrom was assigned to the Navy Base in New London, Connecticut fitting out a division of submarine chasers which he commanded when they were commissioned. He was promoted to temporary lieutenant on July 1, 1918. In August 1918 he was deployed to Plymouth, England and in September was reassigned to Corfu, Greece where he was assigned to Submarine Chaser Detachment Two. In October he was assigned as the aide to the commander of the 1st Submarine Chaser Squadron on board Submarine Chaser 90 until November 21, 1918.

After the war, Nordstrom reverted to his permanent rank of chief boatswain on October 28, 1919. At about the same time, he was assigned to Naval Station Newport in Rhode Island.

=== Death and burial ===
Lieutenant Nordstrom died while on active duty in 1930 at age 53. He is buried in Arlington National Cemetery in Arlington County, Virginia with his wife, Kathryn Veronica Nordstrom.

== Awards ==
- Medal of Honor
- Sampson Medal
- Spanish Campaign Medal
- World War I Victory Medal

== See also ==
- List of Medal of Honor recipients
