= Star Wars: SC 38 – Reimagined =

2019 Star Wars fan remake

- The thumbnail of the video
- Directed by: Philip Silvera
- Based on: Star Wars (1977)
- Produced by: Brady Romberg
- Starring: Dan Brown; Richard Cetrone
- Cinematography: A.J. Rickert-Epstein
- Music by: Lucas King; John Williams (original themes)
- Production company: FXitinPost
- Distributed by: FXitinPost
- Release date: May 8, 2019 (YouTube)
- Running time: 6 minutes
- Country: United States
- Language: English

Star Wars: SC 38 – Reimagined is a 2019 fan remake of the 38th scene in Star Wars (1977), in which the characters of Obi-Wan "Ben" Kenobi and Darth Vader engage in a lightsaber duel on the first Death Star. It was directed by Philip Silvera and stars stuntmen Dan Brown and Richard Cetrone performing in the new footage as Kenobi and Vader, respectively. It was uploaded by FXitinPost to YouTube on May 8, 2019.

== Summary ==
FXitinPost filmed and produced new sequences with VFX, deepfaking, and more elaborate fighting choreography. It intercuts with footage from the original Star Wars scene, and audio (dialogue and music) from Star Wars: Episode III – Revenge of the Sith.

== Cast ==
- Dan Brown as Obi-Wan "Ben" Kenobi
- Richard Cetrone as Darth Vader

The remake uses archival audio and footage from Star Wars (1977) and Star Wars: Episode III – Revenge of the Sith (2005), which includes Alec Guinness and Ewan McGregor as Obi-Wan, James Earl Jones and Hayden Christensen as Vader/Anakin Skywalker, Mark Hamill as Luke Skywalker, Harrison Ford as Han Solo, Carrie Fisher as Leia Organa, Peter Mayhew as Chewbacca, Anthony Daniels as C-3PO, and Kenny Baker as R2-D2.

== Production ==
External videos
- A 4-minute behind the scenes/making of video by FXitinPost on YouTube

In an email to Fast Company, FXitinPost's Christopher Clements explained that the team drew inspiration from the hallway scene of Rogue One: A Star Wars Story (2016), where Darth Vader kills some of the Rebel troops with his lightsaber.

It took two and a half years for the remake to be completed. Most of the time was spent on the post-production and VFX.

== Reception ==
=== Critics ===
Star Wars: SC 38 – Reimagined was well received by critics, most of whom lauded the special effects and fighting choreography, and felt that it updated and improved upon the original scene. Regarding the visual effects, comparisons have also been drawn with the Star Wars prequel trilogy, particularly its third episode, Revenge of the Sith, which features the battle between Obi-Wan and Anakin Skywalker on the planet of Mustafar.

Despite praising the project, Darren Orf of Popular Mechanics was displeased, claiming that it encapsulates "what Star Wars films have lost," referring to the unfavorable reception regarding George Lucas' alterations of the original Star Wars trilogy and the Star Wars prequel trilogy's "overuse" of CGI.

Star Wars: SC 38 - Reimagined has received spots on critics' best fan edits and films lists. James Richards, Dork Side of the Force, ranked it second on his list, noting the exceptional effort behind the project. He highlights how the FXitinPost's reimagining uses CGI, stunt actors, and original footage to enhance the intensity and emotional weight of the duel. Andres Diplotti, Cracked.com, placed the short third on his list, praising it as a standout example of how passionate fans can creatively improve media without the restrictions of studio involvement. Izak Bulten, Screen Rant, ranked it seventh, noting the choreography, character accuracy, and digital recreation of Obi-Wan as evidence that fan-made special editions can succeed where official ones sometimes fall short.

=== Audiences ===
Kofi Outlaw of ComicBook.com noted that fans of Star Wars are divided about the project in that some praised the project for having a "the polish of a modern Star Wars film," and some criticized it, believing that it encapsulates "everything they believe to be wrong with this franchise," which also refers to Lucas' changes of the Original trilogy.
