= USS SC-41 =

WWI US submarine chaser

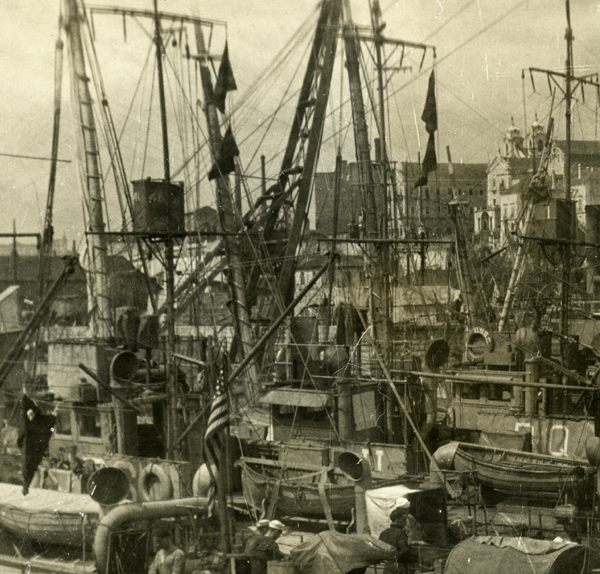
- United States Navy SC-1-class submarine chasers at Lisbon, Portugal. Submarine Chaser No. 41, later SC-41, is closest to the camera, with a canvas cover marked "SC 41" over her crow's nest.

History

United States
- Name: USS Submarine Chaser No. 41 (1917-1920); USS SC-41 (1920-1921)
- Builder: New York Navy Yard, Brooklyn, New York
- Commissioned: 19 February 1918
- Reclassified: SC-41 on 17 July 1920
- Fate: Sold 24 June 1921

General characteristics
- Class & type: SC-1-class submarine chaser
- Displacement: 77 tons normal; 85 tons full load
- Length: 110 ft (34 m) overall; 105 ft (32 m) between perpendiculars
- Beam: 14 ft 9 in (4.50 m)
- Draft: 5 ft 7 in (1.70 m) normal; 6 ft 6 in (1.98 m) full load
- Propulsion: Three 220 bhp (160 kW) Standard Motor Construction Company six-cylinder gasoline engines, three shafts, 2,400 US gallons (9,100 L) of gasoline; one Standard Motor Construction Company two-cylinder gasoline-powered auxiliary engine
- Speed: 18 knots (33 km/h)
- Range: 1,000 nautical miles (1,900 km) at 10 knots (19 km/h)
- Complement: 27 (2 officers, 25 enlisted men)
- Sensors & processing systems: One Submarine Signal Company S.C. C Tube, M.B. Tube, or K Tube hydrophone
- Armament: 1 × 3-inch (76.2 mm)/23-caliber gun mount; 2 × Colt .30 caliber (7.62 mm) machine guns; 1 × Y-gun depth charge projector

USS SC-41, until July 1920 known as USS Submarine Chaser No. 41 or USS S.C. 41, was an SC-1 class submarine chaser built for the United States Navy during World War I.

== Construction and commissioning ==
SC-41 was a wooden-hulled 110-foot (34 m) submarine chaser built at the New York Navy Yard in Brooklyn, New York. She was commissioned on 19 February 1918 as USS Submarine Chaser No. 41, abbreviated at the time as USS S.C. 41.

== Service history ==
When the U.S. Navy adopted its modern hull number system on 17 July 1920, Submarine Chaser No. 41 was classified as SC-41 and her name was shortened to USS SC-41.

On 24 June 1921, the Navy sold the SC-41 for scrap to the C. P. Comerford Company of Lowell, Massachusetts.

"Cinderellas of the Fleet"- over 400 of these sub-chasers were built during the war. Manned mostly by American college men, they were intended primarily to guard the home shores. "Many were sent across where they served effectively against the submarines." - Jim Geldert
