= South Carolina Highway 44 =

South Carolina Highway 44 may refer to:

- South Carolina Highway 44 (1920s), a former state highway from west of Gourdin to Georgetown
- South Carolina Highway 44 (1920s–1940s), a former state highway from Sanders Corner to Manville
