= South Carolina Highway 42 (1930s–1940s) =

Former state highway in South Carolina, United States

South Carolina Highway 42

Route information
- Maintained by SCDOT
- Existed: 1922–c.1925

Major junctions
- South end: SC 33 near Cope
- North end: SC 4 in Orangeburg

Location
- Country: United States
- State: South Carolina
- Counties: Orangeburg

Highway system
- South Carolina State Highway System; Interstate; US; State; Scenic
← SC 41	→ SC 43

South Carolina Highway 42 (SC 42) was a state highway that existed in the central part of Orangeburg County. It connected Cordova and Orangeburg.

== Route description ==
SC 32 began at an intersection with SC 33 (now U.S. Route 301 (US 301) and US 601) northeast of Cope. It traveled to the southeast to Cordova. It then proceeded to the northeast and north-northeast to SC 4 (also now US 301/US 601) in Orangeburg.

== History ==
SC 32 was an original state highway, being established at least as early as 1922. It was decommissioned in 1947. It was downgraded to secondary roads. Today, it is known as Legrand Smoak Street, Cordova Road, and Cannon Bridge Road.

== Major intersections ==
The entire route was in Orangeburg County.

Location	mi	km	Destinations	Notes
			SC 33	Western terminus; now US 301/US 601
Orangeburg			SC 4	Eastern terminus; now US 301/US 601
1.000 mi = 1.609 km; 1.000 km = 0.621 mi
