= USS SC-4 =

US WW1 submarine chaser

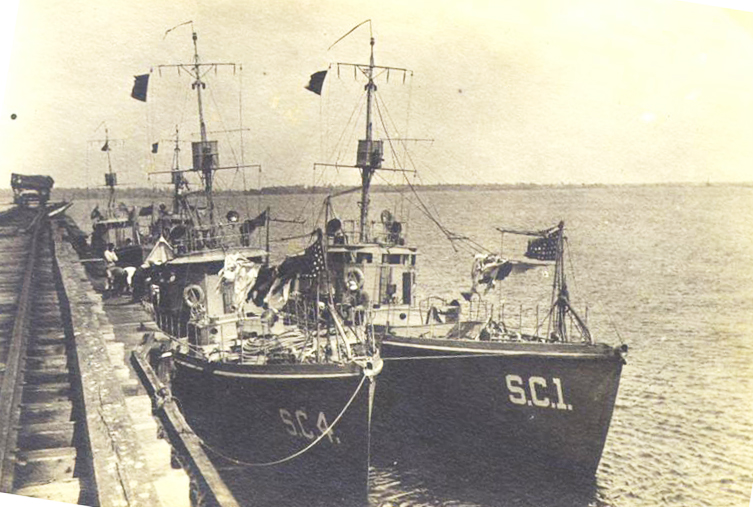
- USS S.C. 4 (left) and her sister ship USS S.C. 1 (right) at Charleston, South Carolina.

History

United States
- Name: USS Submarine Chaser No. 4; Retrospectively USS SC-4 (since July 1920)
- Builder: Naval Station New Orleans, New Orleans, Louisiana
- Commissioned: 19 February 1918
- Fate: Sold 19 March 1920

General characteristics
- Class & type: SC-1-class submarine chaser
- Displacement: 77 tons normal; 85 tons full load
- Length: 110 ft (34 m) overall; 105 ft (32 m) between perpendiculars
- Beam: 14 ft 9 in (4.50 m)
- Draft: 5 ft 7 in (1.70 m) normal; 6 ft 6 in (1.98 m) full load
- Propulsion: Three 220 bhp (160 kW) Standard Motor Construction Company six-cylinder gasoline engines, three shafts, 2,400 US gallons (9,100 L) of gasoline; one Standard Motor Construction Company two-cylinder gasoline-powered auxiliary engine
- Speed: 18 knots (33 km/h)
- Range: 1,000 nautical miles (1,900 km) at 10 knots (19 km/h)
- Complement: 27 (2 officers, 25 enlisted men)
- Sensors & processing systems: One Submarine Signal Company S.C. C Tube, M.B. Tube, or K Tube hydrophone
- Armament: 1 × 3-inch (76.2 mm)/23-caliber gun mount; 2 × Colt .30 caliber (7.62 mm) machine guns; 1 × Y-gun depth charge projector

USS SC-4, during her service life known as Submarine Chaser No. 4 or S.C. 4, was an SC-1-class submarine chaser built for the United States Navy during World War I.

SC-4 was a wooden-hulled 110-foot (34 m) submarine chaser built at Naval Station New Orleans in New Orleans, Louisiana. She was commissioned on 19 February 1918 as USS Submarine Chaser No. 4, abbreviated at the time as USS S.C. 4.

During World War I, S.C. 4 served in the Special Hunting Squadron, USS Salem Group, on antisubmarine patrol duty against German submarines in the Gulf of Mexico, and was based at Key West, Florida.

On 19 March 1920, the Navy sold S.C. 4 to David A. Clarkson of Nassau in the Bahamas.

The U.S. Navy adopted its modern hull number system on 17 July 1920. Although Submarine Chaser No. 4 had already been sold by then, since that date she has been referred to retrospectively as USS SC-4 - the shortened name she would have received under the new system had she still been in Navy service at that time.
