= USS SC-3 =

Submarine chaser

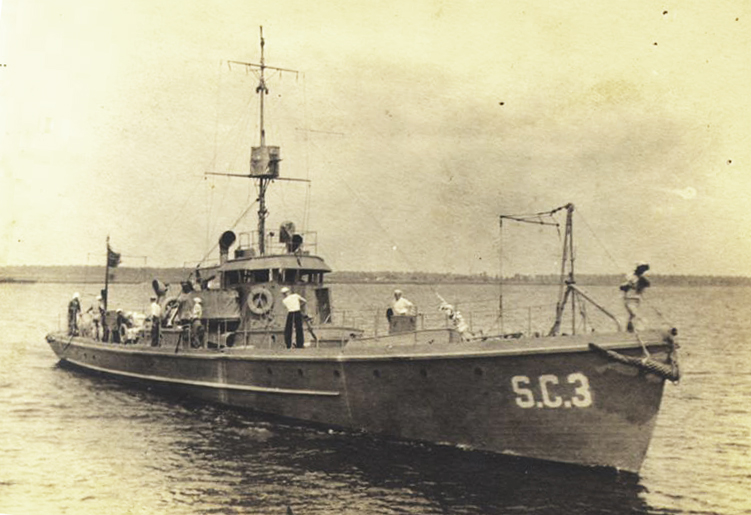
- USS S.C. 3 at Charleston, South Carolina..

History

United States
- Name: USS Submarine Chaser No. 3 (1918–1920); USS SC-3 (1920)
- Builder: Naval Station New Orleans, New Orleans, Louisiana
- Commissioned: 23 January 1918
- Reclassified: SC-3 on 17 July 1920
- Fate: Sold 4 October 1920

General characteristics
- Class & type: SC-1-class submarine chaser
- Displacement: 77 tons normal; 85 tons full load
- Length: 110 ft (34 m) overall; 105 ft (32 m) between perpendiculars
- Beam: 14 ft 9 in (4.50 m)
- Draft: 5 ft 7 in (1.70 m) normal; 6 ft 6 in (1.98 m) full load
- Propulsion: Three 220 bhp (160 kW) Standard Motor Construction Company six-cylinder gasoline engines, three shafts, 2,400 US gallons (9,100 L) of gasoline; one Standard Motor Construction Company two-cylinder gasoline-powered auxiliary engine
- Speed: 18 knots (33 km/h)
- Range: 1,000 nautical miles (1,900 km) at 10 knots (19 km/h)
- Complement: 27 (2 officers, 25 enlisted men)
- Sensors & processing systems: One Submarine Signal Company S.C. C Tube, M.B. Tube, or K Tube hydrophone
- Armament: 1 × 3-inch (76.2 mm)/23-caliber gun mount; 2 × Colt .30 caliber (7.62 mm) machine guns; 1 × Y-gun depth charge projector

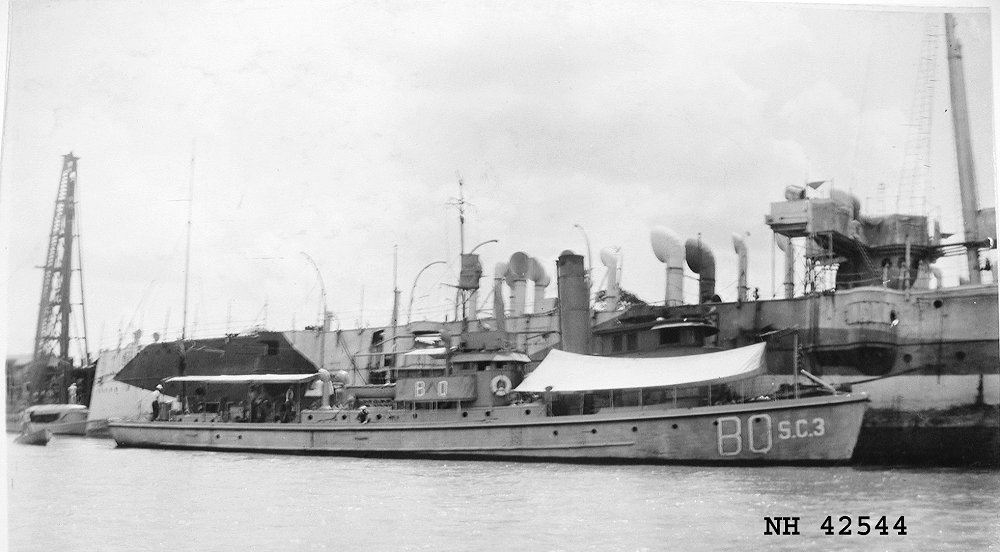
USS S.C. 3 alongside the decommissioned protected cruiser USS Cincinnati (C-7) at New Orleans, Louisiana, sometime between April 1919 and April 1920. S.C. 3's "BO" markings are convoy station markings. Cincinnati is painted in dazzle camouflage and her funnels have been removed.

USS SC-3, until July 1920 known as USS Submarine Chaser No. 3 or USS S.C. 3, was an SC-1-class submarine chaser built for the United States Navy during World War I.

SC-3 was a wooden-hulled 110-foot (34 m) submarine chaser built at Naval Station New Orleans in New Orleans, Louisiana. She was commissioned on 23 January 1918 as USS Submarine Chaser No. 3, abbreviated at the time as USS S.C. 3.

During World War I, S.C. 3 served on antisubmarine patrol duty in the Special Hunting Squadron, USS Salem Group, against German submarines in the Gulf of Mexico, and was based at Key West, Florida.

When the U.S. Navy adopted its modern hull number system on 17 July 1920, Submarine Chaser No. 3 was classified as SC-3 and her name was shortened to USS SC-3.

On 4 October 1920, the Navy sold SC-3 to the Cuba Products Company of New Orleans.
