= USS SC-42 =

1918 SC-1-class submarine chaser

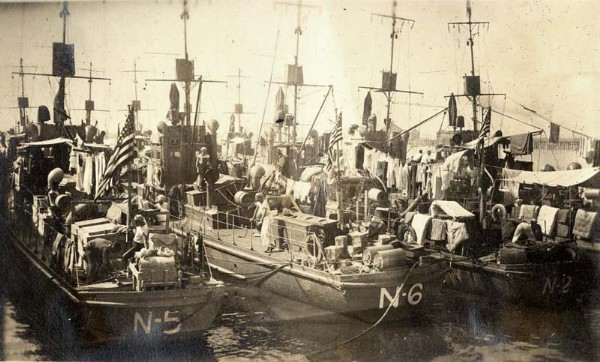
- The SC-1-class submarine chasers S.C. 102 (bearing identification marking "N-5"), SC-105 (bearing identification marking N-6), and S.C. 42 (bearing identification marking "N-2"). The three submarine chasers made up half of Division N of the USS Jouett Group in 1918 when this photograph was taken, and later (from 4 September 1918) made up the entirety of Group B of the USS Henley Group.

History

United States
- Name: USS Submarine Chaser No. 42 (1917-1920); USS SC-42 (1920-1921)
- Builder: New York Navy Yard, Brooklyn, New York
- Commissioned: 2 March 1918
- Reclassified: SC-42 on 17 July 1920
- Fate: Sold 24 June 1921

General characteristics
- Class & type: SC-1-class submarine chaser
- Displacement: 77 tons normal; 85 tons full load
- Length: 110 ft (34 m) overall; 105 ft (32 m) between perpendiculars
- Beam: 14 ft 9 in (4.50 m)
- Draft: 5 ft 7 in (1.70 m) normal; 6 ft 6 in (1.98 m) full load
- Propulsion: Three 220 bhp (160 kW) Standard Motor Construction Company six-cylinder gasoline engines, three shafts, 2,400 US gallons (9,100 L) of gasoline; one Standard Motor Construction Company two-cylinder gasoline-powered auxiliary engine
- Speed: 18 knots (33 km/h)
- Range: 1,000 nautical miles (1,900 km) at 10 knots (19 km/h)
- Complement: 27 (2 officers, 25 enlisted men)
- Sensors & processing systems: One Submarine Signal Company S.C. C Tube, M.B. Tube, or K Tube hydrophone
- Armament: 1 × 3-inch (76.2 mm)/23-caliber gun mount; 2 × Colt .30 caliber (7.62 mm) machine guns; 1 × Y-gun depth charge projector

USS SC-42, until July 1920 known as USS Submarine Chaser No. 42 or USS S.C. 42, was an SC-1-class submarine chaser built for the United States Navy during World War I.

== Construction and commissioning ==
SC-42 was a wooden-hulled 110-foot (34 m) submarine chaser built at the New York Navy Yard at Brooklyn, New York. She was commissioned on 2 March 1918 as USS Submarine Chaser No. 42, abbreviated at the time as USS S.C. 42.

== Service history ==
When the U.S. Navy adopted its modern hull number system on 17 July 1920, Submarine Chaser No. 42 was classified as SC-42 and her name was shortened to USS SC-42.

On 24 June 1921, the Navy sold SC-42 to Joseph G. Hitner of Philadelphia, Pennsylvania.
