= List of SC-1-class subchasers (SC-401 to SC-448) =

The SC-1 class was a large class of submarine chasers built during World War I for the United States Navy. They were ordered in very large numbers in order to combat attacks by German U-boats, with 442 vessels built from 1917 to 1919. This article lists details of the ninth group of 48 ships of the class.

== Ships ==
Number	Builder	Commissioned	Fate	Notes
USS SC-401	New York Yacht, Launch & Engine; Morris Heights, Bronx	24 October 1918	To France as C-98	Took part in Dunkirk evacuation. Seized by UK in July 1940; Scrapped 1940
USS SC-402	New York Yacht, Launch & Engine; Morris Heights, Bronx	24 October 1918	To France as C-85	
USS SC-403	Rocky River Dry Dock Co. Rocky River, Ohio	24 October 1918	To France as C-87	
USS SC-404	Rocky River Dry Dock Co. Rocky River, Ohio	24 October 1918	To France as C-88	
USS SC-405	Rocky River Dry Dock Co. Rocky River, Ohio	24 October 1918	Renumbered SC-177	Planned for transfer to France but damaged during grounding before delivery and swapped with SC-177.
USS SC-406	Rocky River Dry Dock Co. Rocky River, Ohio	24 October 1918	To France as C-94	
USS SC-407	Camden Anchor-Rockland Machine Co; Camden, Maine	16 January 1919	Sold 21 April 1920	Yacht North Star 1927, Fishing boat 1931, Freighter 1933, Cod fishing boat 1937.
USS SC-408	Camden Anchor-Rockland Machine Co; Camden, Maine	11 February 1919	Sold 6 June 1922	Never commissioned
USS SC-409	Chance Marine Construction; Annapolis, Maryland	3 February 1918	Sold 24 June 1922	Never commissioned
USS SC-410	Chance Marine Construction; Annapolis, Maryland	N/A	N/A	Cancelled during construction
USS SC-411	Clayton Ship & Boat Building Co; Clayton, New York	1 May 1919	Sold 30 January 1920	Named Brunette 1920, renamed Sentinel 1925, renamed Romance 1926; Extant 1954
USS SC-412	Clayton Ship & Boat Building Co; Clayton, New York	1 May 1919	Decommissioned 25 July 1945	To Maritime Commission 7 August 1946; Fishing boat Joe-De-Mac 1948; Scrapped 1953
USS SC-413	College Point Boat Corp. College Point, New York	1919	To War Department 30 April 1920	Sold 24 June 1921
USS SC-414	College Point Boat Corp. College Point, New York	1919	To War Department 2 September 1919	Artillery Steamer V-1; Decommissioned 15 February 1920
USS SC-415	College Point Boat Corp. College Point, New York	8 January 1919	To US Coast Guard 16 December 1919 as USCGC Hahn.	Sold 29 January 1923
USS SC-416	College Point Boat Corp. College Point, New York	13 January 1919	Sold 24 June 1921.	
USS SC-417	College Point Boat Corp. College Point, New York	31 January 1919	To US Coast Guard 16 December 1919 as USCGC Stellenwerf.	Sold 25 May 1922
USS SC-418	College Point Boat Corp. College Point, New York	1919	Sold 4 March 1920.	
USS SC-419	Great Lakes Boat Building Corp. Milwaukee	22 November 1918	Sold 27 April 1927.	Naval Reserve training vessel
USS SC-420	Great Lakes Boat Building Corp. Milwaukee	1919	Sold 3 February 1920.	Opco 1920, Mareuilendole 1921
USS SC-421	Hiltebrant Dry Dock Co. Kingston, New York	1919	Sold 24 June 1921.	
USS SC-422	Hiltebrant Dry Dock Co. Kingston, New York	1919	Sold 11 May 1921.	Yacht Dorothy 1927
USS SC-423	Hiltebrant Dry Dock Co. Kingston, New York	1919	Sold 11 May 1921.	
USS SC-424	Hiltebrant Dry Dock Co. Kingston, New York	21 December 1918	Sold 19 May 1921.	Named Nelmore 1923, Freighter Noca 1927
USS SC-425	Hiltebrant Dry Dock Co. Kingston, New York	23 December 1918	Sold 11 May 1921.	York 1923, Freight boat Cico 1927
USS SC-426	Mathis Yacht Building; Camden, New Jersey	8 January 1919	Sold 6 June 1922.	
USS SC-427	Mathis Yacht Building; Camden, New Jersey	8 January 1919	Sold 17 August 1921.	
USS SC-428	Mathis Yacht Building; Camden, New Jersey	8 January 1919	Loaned to City of Baltimore 16 May 1921.	Used as fireboat with name Cascade by Baltimore. Returned to US Navy 1960.
USS SC-429	Mathis Yacht Building; Camden, New Jersey	28 December 1918	Sold 26 May 1921.	Freighter Explorer 1926
USS SC-430	Mathis Yacht Building; Camden, New Jersey	15 January 1919	Sold 21 October 1921.	Fishing boat Anna M 1931, Fishing boat Uncle John 1948
USS SC-431	Matthews Boat Co. Port Clinton, Ohio	29 October 1919	To US Coast Guard on completion as USCGC Knudsen.	Returned to US Navy 31 August 1921; To Maritime Commission for disposal 9 December 1946; Fishing boat Admiral 1948, renamed Sea Mist 1978; No records after 1984
USS SC-432	Matthews Boat Co. Port Clinton, Ohio	To Maritime Commission for disposal 27 July 1945		
USS SC-433	Matthews Boat Co. Port Clinton, Ohio	25 December 1918	To US Coast Guard as USCGC Klingelhoefer 29 October 1919	Returned to US Navy 31 August 1921; Scuttled Lake Ontario, 29 January 1938
USS SC-434	Alexander McDonald; Mariners Harbor, Staten Island	11 January 1919	Sold 22 April 1920	Yacht Manchonoch 1920, Center engine removed Fishing boat 1931, still extant 1933
USS SC-435	Alexander McDonald; Mariners Harbor, Staten Island	27 January 1919	US Coast Guard as USCGC Johansson 21 October 1919	Never commissioned in US Navy; Sold 27 December 1922; Fishing boat Waltham II 1931
USS SC-436	Alexander McDonald; Mariners Harbor, Staten Island	4 February 1919	Sold 1 June 1921	Never commissioned in US Navy; Fishing boat Beatrice K, still extant 1931
USS SC-437	Rocky River Dry Dock Co. Rocky River, Ohio	1 March 1919	US Coast Guard as USCGC Boyce 29 October 1919	Returned to US Navy 31 August 1921; Used for training on Great Lakes; To Maritime Commission for disposal 21 March 1947; Freighter Charlmar 1947, scrapped 1961
USS SC-438	Matthews Boat; Port Clinton, Ohio	1919	US Coast Guard as USCGC Cook 22 November 1919	Sold 28 May 1936; Civilian Islander - re-engined with two diesel engines To US Coast Guard 5 March 1943 as USCGC Bonneville (WIX-375); Sold 1946 - Civilian Victory; 1952, renamed Admiral. Scrapped 1957
USS SC-439	Howard E. Wheeler; Brooklyn, New York	3 January 1919	Sold 25 February 1922.	
USS SC-440	Howard E. Wheeler; Brooklyn, New York	20 January 1919	Scrapped August 1942.	Used for training at US Naval Academy
USS SC-441	Howard E. Wheeler; Brooklyn, New York	21 January 1919	Sold 26 June 1922.	
USS SC-442	Howard E. Wheeler; Brooklyn, New York	-	Cancelled 1918.	
USS SC-443	U.S. Naval Station, New Orleans	26 August 1919	Sold 29 January 1924.	
USS SC-444	U.S. Naval Station, New Orleans	26 August 1919	Sold 24 March 1923.	
USS SC-445	U.S. Naval Station, New Orleans	-	Cancelled 20 November 1918.	
USS SC-446	U.S. Naval Station, New Orleans	-	Cancelled 20 November 1918.	
USS SC-447	U.S. Naval Station, New Orleans	-	Cancelled 20 November 1918.	
USS SC-448	U.S. Naval Station, New Orleans	-	Cancelled 20 November 1918.	

== See also ==
- List of patrol vessels of the United States Navy
- List of SC-1-class subchasers (SC-1 to SC-50)
- List of SC-1-class subchasers (SC-51 to SC-100)
- List of SC-1-class subchasers (SC-101 to SC-150)
- List of SC-1-class subchasers (SC-151 to SC-200)
- List of SC-1-class subchasers (SC-201 to SC-250)
- List of SC-1-class subchasers (SC-251 to SC-300)
- List of SC-1-class subchasers (SC-301 to SC-350)
- List of SC-1-class subchasers (SC-351 to SC-400)
