= List of SC-1-class subchasers (SC-101 to SC-150) =

The SC-1 class was a large class of submarine chasers built during World War I for the United States Navy. They were ordered in very large numbers in order to combat attacks by German U-boats, with 442 vessels built from 1917 to 1919. This article lists details of the third 50 ships of the class.

== Ships ==
Number	Builder	Commissioned	Fate	Notes
USS SC-101	Elco; Bayonne, New Jersey	2 March 1918	Sold 24 June 1921.	Based at Plymouth, England and Brest, France during World War I Re-acquired by US Navy in 1942 as YP-180, resold in 1945, later named Fidus, Palace II and Fiscus III. Scrapped 1971.
USS SC-102	Elco	12 March 1918	To War Shipping Administration 3 January 1947.	Sunk by collision with USS Adamant on 11 February 1942 but salvaged on 24 February 1942 and repaired.
USS SC-103	Elco	7 March 1918	Sank at pierside September 1939; Later salvaged and scuttled by burning.	Stationed at Brest, France during World War I. Lent to Michigan Naval Militia on 1 July 1926 and to Buffalo Council, Boy Scouts of America on 25 September 1936.
USS SC-104	Elco	12 March 1918	Sold 22 December 1922.	
USS SC-105	Elco	9 November 1917	Sold 20 July 1921.	
USS SC-106	Charleston Navy Yard	31 December 1917	Sold 10 November 1921.	
USS SC-107	Charleston Navy Yard	19 January 1918	Sold 24 June 1921.	
USS SC-108	Charleston Navy Yard	12 February 1918	Transferred to War Department 18 September 1918.	
USS SC-109	Charleston Navy Yard	12 February 1918	Sold 24 June 1921.	
USS SC-110	Charleston Navy Yard	30 March 1918	Sold 24 June 1921.	Based at Plymouth, England and Queenstown (now Cobh), Ireland in World War I. Took part in minesweeping operations in North Sea after end of war.
USS SC-111	Charleston Navy Yard	30 March 1918	Sold 24 June 1921.	Based at Plymouth, England during World War I.
USS SC-112	Charleston Navy Yard	22 April 1918	Sold 24 June 1921.	Based at Key West.
USS SC-113	Charleston Navy Yard	3 May 1918	Sold 24 June 1921.	
USS SC-114	Naval Station, New Orleans	28 March 1918	Sold 24 June 1921.	Based at Pensacola.
USS SC-115	Naval Station, New Orleans	3 May 1918	Sold 24 June 1921.	
USS SC-116	Norfolk Navy Yard	14 November 1917	Sold 24 June 1921.	
USS SC-117	Norfolk Navy Yard	November 1917	Destroyed in fire 22 December 1917.	
USS SC-118	Norfolk Navy Yard	26 November 1917	Sold 24 June 1921.	
USS SC-119	Norfolk Navy Yard	19 November 1917	Sold 20 December 1921.	
USS SC-120	Norfolk Navy Yard	4 October 1917	Sold 20 July 1921	Served in Atlantic Fleet.
USS SC-121	Norfolk Navy Yard	16 October 1917	Sold 24 June 1921.	
USS SC-122	Norfolk Navy Yard	21 October 1917	Sold 24 June 1921.	Used as fishing vessel after sale. Renamed Effort III in 1927 and Belboy III in 1949. Scrapped 1957.
USS SC-123	Norfolk Navy Yard	5 November 1917	Sold 24 June 1921.	Served off East coast of United States during war.
USS SC-124	Norfolk Navy Yard	11 December 1917	Sold 11 May 1921.	Based at Corfu during war. Served in Mediterranean post-war.
USS SC-125	Norfolk Navy Yard	27 December 1917	Sold 24 June 1921.	Served in Azores.
USS SC-126	Norfolk Navy Yard	14 January 1918	Sold 24 June 1921.	
USS SC-127	Norfolk Navy Yard	15 January 1918	Sold 24 June 1921.	Served in Mediterranean. Used as ferry/mail boat between 1924 and 1957.
USS SC-128	Norfolk Navy Yard	18 January 1918	Sold in Italy June 1919.	Served on Otranto Barrage.
USS SC-129	Norfolk Navy Yard	17 January 1918	Sold 24 June 1921.	Served on Otranto Barrage.
USS SC-130	Norfolk Navy Yard	21 December 1917	Sold 11 May 1921.	
USS SC-131	Norfolk Navy Yard	19 January 1918	Sold 24 June 1921.	Served on Otranto Barrage.
USS SC-132	Norfolk Navy Yard	2 February 1918	Sunk in collision 5 June 1918.	
USS SC-133	Norfolk Navy Yard	13 March 1918	Sold 20 July 1921.	
USS SC-134	Norfolk Navy Yard	13 March 1918	Sold 20 July 1921.	
USS SC-135	Norfolk Navy Yard	13 March 1918	Sold 24 June 1921.	
USS SC-136	Norfolk Navy Yard	19 March 1918	Sold 24 June 1921.	
USS SC-137	Hodgdon Brothers; East Boothbay, Maine	14 December 1917	Sold 24 June 1921.	
USS SC-138	Hodgdon Brothers; East Boothbay, Maine	24 January 1918	Sold 24 June 1921.	Served on US East coast during war.
USS SC-139	Hodgdon Brothers; East Boothbay, Maine	-	-	Cancelled
USS SC-140	Hartman-Greiling; Green Bay, Wisconsin	5 October 1918	To France as C-43.	Sunk in collision with the destroyer Fronde, 3 July 1918.
USS SC-141	Hartman-Greiling; Green Bay, Wisconsin	22 December 1917	Sunk in collision with USS SC-171	Planned to be transferred to France
USS SC-142	Rocky River Dry Dock; Rocky River, Ohio	30 March 1918	To France as C-34	
USS SC-143	Rocky River Dry Dock; Rocky River, Ohio	10 November 1917	Sold 9 September 1936.	Based at Plymouth, England during World War I
USS SC-144	Vinyard Shipbuilding; Milford, Delaware	30 March 1918	Sold to state of Florida 3 February 1923.	Based at Philadelphia during war.
USS SC-145	Vinyard Shipbuilding; Milford, Delaware	13 March 1918	Sold 7 July 1921.	
USS SC-146	Vinyard Shipbuilding; Milford, Delaware	30 March 1918	To France as C-35.	
USS SC-147	L E Fry; Clayton, New York	13 December 1917	Sold 25 February 1922.	Served in Otranto Barrage.
USS SC-148	L E Fry; Clayton, New York	10 December 1917	Sold 24 June 1921.	Based at Plymouth, England during World War I
USS SC-149	Dubuque Boat & Boiler Works; Dubuque, Iowa	15 January 1918	Sold 24 June 1921.	
USS SC-150	Dubuque Boat & Boiler Works; Dubuque, Iowa	2 March 1918	Sold 24 June 1921.	

== See also ==
- List of patrol vessels of the United States Navy
- List of SC-1-class subchasers (SC-1 to SC-50)
- List of SC-1-class subchasers (SC-51 to SC-100)
- List of SC-1-class subchasers (SC-151 to SC-200)
- List of SC-1-class subchasers (SC-201 to SC-250)
- List of SC-1-class subchasers (SC-251 to SC-300)
- List of SC-1-class subchasers (SC-301 to SC-350)
- List of SC-1-class subchasers (SC-351 to SC-400)
- List of SC-1-class subchasers (SC-401 to SC-448)
