= List of SC-1-class subchasers (SC-301 to SC-350) =

The SC-1 class was a large class of submarine chasers built during World War I for the United States Navy. They were ordered in very large numbers in order to combat attacks by German U-boats, with 442 vessels built from 1917 to 1919. This article lists details of the seventh group of 50 ships of the class.

== Ships ==
Number	Builder	Commissioned	Fate	Notes
USS SC-301	Puget Sound Naval Shipyard; Puget Sound, Washington	29 April 1917	Sold 10 April 1922	Based at Azores during war. Fishing boat Silver Screen 1927
USS SC-302	Puget Sound Naval Shipyard; Puget Sound, Washington	11 January 1918	Sold to Cuban Navy 9 November 1918 as No. 2	Used for coastguard duties 1931. Scrapped 1950s
USS SC-303	Puget Sound Naval Shipyard; Puget Sound, Washington	4 May 1918	Sold 25 September 1922.	Operated off Mexican coast during war.
USS SC-304	Puget Sound Naval Shipyard; Puget Sound, Washington	4 May 1918	Sold 8 April 1922.	Operated off Mexican coast during war.
USS SC-305	Puget Sound Naval Shipyard; Puget Sound, Washington	11 May 1918	Sold 10 April 1922.	
USS SC-306	Puget Sound Naval Shipyard; Puget Sound, Washington	27 February 1918	Sold to Department of Justice 17 December 1930.	Named McDowell in DoJ service and operated at Alcatraz Federal Penitentiary
USS SC-307	Puget Sound Naval Shipyard; Puget Sound, Washington	11 May 1918	To Department of War 26 June 1920.	
USS SC-308	Puget Sound Naval Shipyard; Puget Sound, Washington	23 February 1918	Sold 25 September 1922.	To Canada 1930 and named Hurry Home; Renamed Marauder in 1938. To Royal Canadian Navy 1939, commissioned into Fisherman's Reserve as HMCS Marauder with pennant number FY03; Sold 1949; Foundered 18 December 1951 off British Columbia
USS SC-309	Puget Sound Naval Shipyard; Puget Sound, Washington	18 May 1918	Sold 20 January 1921.	Based in Alaska during war 1920 yacht Reindeer; To Canada 1925 and renamed Coreseus; Renamed Evelina M 1938; Renamed Xanadu 1946; Renamed Araucano 1975; Renamed Duchess of Bremerton 1991; Scrapped 2001
USS SC-310	Puget Sound Naval Shipyard; Puget Sound, Washington	18 May 1918	Sold 4 February 1922.	Based in Alaska during war To Canada 1922, Renamed Trucilla 1923; Still extant 1959
USS SC-311	Puget Sound Naval Shipyard; Puget Sound, Washington	18 May 1918	Sold to Cuban Navy 5 November 1918 as No. 3	Used for coastguard duties 1931. Scrapped 1950s
USS SC-312	Puget Sound Naval Shipyard; Puget Sound, Washington	18 May 1918	Sold to Cuban Navy 5 November 1918 as No. 4	Used for coastguard duties 1931. Scrapped 1950s
USS SC-313	Robert Jacob; City Island, Bronx	5 October 1918	To France as C-45.	
USS SC-314	Robert Jacob; City Island, Bronx	22 December 1917	To France as C-27.	
USS SC-315	Robert Jacob; City Island, Bronx	11 January 1917	To France as C-19.	
USS SC-316	Robert Jacob; City Island, Bronx	11 January 1917	To France as C-20.	
USS SC-317	Robert Jacob; City Island, Bronx	11 January 1917	To France as C-21.	
USS SC-318	Luders Marine Construction Company; Stamford, Connecticut	22 December 1917	To France as C-28.	
USS SC-319	Luders Marine Construction Company; Stamford, Connecticut	22 December 1917	To France	Disappeared at sea during delivery to France 18 January 1918.
USS SC-320	Luders Marine Construction Company; Stamford, Connecticut	1 December 1917	Sold 7 July 1927.	Operated in Gulf of Mexico during war
USS SC-321	Luders Marine Construction Company; Stamford, Connecticut	8 January 1918	Sold 18 February 1920.	Based at Plymouth, England and Harwich during war.
USS SC-322	Luders Marine Construction Company; Stamford, Connecticut	7 March 1918	Sold 8 March 1922	Based at Plymouth, England and Brest, France during war
USS SC-323	Kyle & Purdy; City Island, Bronx	5 December 1917	Sold 11 May 1922.	Based at Plymouth, England and Queenstown (now Cobh), Ireland during war Yacht 323 from 1921, freight boat from 1935
USS SC-324	Kyle & Purdy; City Island, Bronx	13 December 1917	Sold 24 June 1921	Based at Corfu during war and served on Otranto Barrage.
USS SC-325	Kyle & Purdy; City Island, Bronx	13 December 1917	Sold 24 June 1921	Based at Plymouth, England during war/
USS SC-326	Kyle & Purdy; City Island, Bronx	14 November 1917	Sold 8 November 1935	Fishing boat North Sea in 1948
USS SC-327	Kyle & Purdy; City Island, Bronx	10 December 1917	To Italy June 1919	Based at Corfu during war and served on Otranto Barrage.
USS SC-328	Great Lakes Boat Building; Milwaukee, Wisconsin	20 October 1917	Sold 8 November 1935	Took part in sweeping of Northern Barrage in 1919, based at Kirkwall. Fishing boat Sea Roamer 1937; Renamed Katherine & Mary 1948; Foundered off New Jersey coast 28 May 1955
USS SC-329	Great Lakes Boat Building; Milwaukee, Wisconsin	20 October 1917	Sold 25 September 1922	Based at Plymouth, England and Queenstown, Ireland during war, and took part in sweeping of Northern Barrage in 1919; Yacht Siwash III in 1923.
USS SC-330	Burger Boat Company; Manitowoc, Wisconsin	8 February 1918	To War Shipping Administration for disposal 8 October 1946	Based at Gibraltar during war Assigned Hull number PC-330 in 1920 and used as Naval Reserve training vessel in US Midwest; Redesignated SC-330 April 1943
USS SC-331	Smith & Williams; Salisbury, Maryland	13 March 1918	Sold 29 April 1921	Based at Gibraltar during war
USS SC-332	Smith & Williams; Salisbury, Maryland	13 March 1918	Sold 29 January 1924	Based at Gibraltar postwar
USS SC-333	Barret Shipbuilding; Mobile, Alabama	26 January 1918	To US Coast Guard 4 February 1920 as USCGC Deering	Sold by Coast Guard 2 October 1922; Freighter Houtex 1931; Registered as tug 1935
USS SC-334	Barret Shipbuilding; Mobile, Alabama	4 March 1918	To US Coast Guard 4 February 1920 as USCGC Talley	Sold by Coast Guard 2 October 1922; Pilot boat Houston Pilot No. 2 1927; Still extant 1935
USS SC-335	Barret Shipbuilding; Mobile, Alabama	To US Coast Guard 22 November 1919 as USCGC Cygan	Served with Coast Guard at Key West, San Francisco, and Alaska; Decommissioned 20 May 1936	
USS SC-336	Barret Shipbuilding; Mobile, Alabama	6 May 1918	Sold 30 October 1920 to City of New Orleans	
USS SC-337	L. E. Fry & Co; Clayton, New York	24 December 1917	Sold 24 June 1921.	Based at Corfu during war and served on Otranto Barrage.
USS SC-338	L. E. Fry & Co; Clayton, New York	24 December 1917	Sold 19 September 1922.	Based at Corfu during war and served on Otranto Barrage.
USS SC-339	American Car and Foundry; Clayton, New York	16 February 1918	Lost 19 September 1919	Grounded at Key West during 1919 Florida Keys hurricane Machinery and fittings salvaged, remains sold for scrap 25 January 1921
USS SC-340	American Car and Foundry; Clayton, New York	16 February 1918	Lost 6 October 1923	Based in Azores during war. Destroyed by fire off Saint John, U.S. Virgin Islands
USS SC-341	American Car and Foundry; Clayton, New York	22 March 1918	Sold 5 April 1927	Based in Azores during war.
USS SC-342	American Car and Foundry; Clayton, New York	15 March 1918	Sold 26 May 1921	Based at Plymouth, England and Queenstown, Ireland during war Took part in sweeping of Northern Barrage in 1919
USS SC-343	American Car and Foundry; Clayton, New York	15 March 1918	Lost 15 May 1919	Based at Plymouth, England during war Destroyed by fire at Ireland Island, Bermuda
USS SC-344	American Car and Foundry; Clayton, New York	23 March 1918	Sold 26 May 1921.	Based at Plymouth, England during war
USS SC-345	American Car and Foundry; Clayton, New York	25 March 1918	Sold 26 May 1921.	Based at Plymouth, England during war
USS SC-346	American Car and Foundry; Clayton, New York	25 March 1918	Sold 28 April 1920.	Based at Plymouth, England and Queenstown, Ireland during war
USS SC-347	College Point Boat; College Point, Queens	11 January 1917	To France as C-18	
USS SC-348	College Point Boat; College Point, Queens	11 January 1917	To France as C-12	
USS SC-349	College Point Boat; College Point, Queens	14 November 1917	Sold 26 May 1921.	Based at Corfu during war and served on Otranto Barrage. Fishing boat Sonia 1927
USS SC-350	College Point Boat; College Point, Queens	30 March 1918	To France as C-30	

== See also ==
- List of patrol vessels of the United States Navy
- List of SC-1-class subchasers (SC-1 to SC-50)
- List of SC-1-class subchasers (SC-51 to SC-100)
- List of SC-1-class subchasers (SC-101 to SC-150)
- List of SC-1-class subchasers (SC-151 to SC-200)
- List of SC-1-class subchasers (SC-201 to SC-250)
- List of SC-1-class subchasers (SC-251 to SC-300)
- List of SC-1-class subchasers (SC-351 to SC-400)
- List of SC-1-class subchasers (SC-401 to SC-448)
