= List of SC-1-class subchasers (SC-251 to SC-300) =

The SC-1 class was a large class of submarine chasers built during World War I for the United States Navy. They were ordered in very large numbers in order to combat attacks by German U-boats, with 442 vessels built from 1917 to 1919. This article lists details of the sixth group of 50 ships of the class.

== Ships ==
| Number | Builder | Commissioned | Fate | Notes |
|---|---|---|---|---|
| USS SC-251 | Camden Anchor-Rockland Machine Co. Camden, Maine | 29 December 1917 | Sold 19 May 1923. | Based at Azores during war. |
| USS SC-252 | Camden Anchor-Rockland Machine Co. Camden, Maine | 7 March 1918 | Sold 8 September 1936 | Based at Plymouth, England during war |
| USS SC-253 | George Lawley & Son; Neponset, Boston | 7 March 1918 | Sold 9 December 1922. | Based at Gibraltar during war |
| USS SC-254 | George Lawley & Son; Neponset, Boston | 15 November 1917 | Sold 24 June 1921. | Based at Plymouth, England and Queenstown (now Cobh) during war, and took part in clearing of North Sea Mine Barrage post war. |
| USS SC-255 | George Lawley & Son; Neponset, Boston | 19 November 1917 | Sold 24 June 1921. | Based at Corfu during war. |
| USS SC-256 | George Lawley & Son; Neponset, Boston | 19 November 1917 | Destroyed by fire 1 November 1919. | Based at Corfu during war. |
| USS SC-257 | George Lawley & Son; Neponset, Boston | 28 November 1917 | Sold 25 February 1922. | Based at Plymouth, England during war |
| USS SC-258 | George Lawley & Son; Neponset, Boston | 28 November 1917 | Sold 24 June 1921. | Based at Plymouth, England during war Named Liberty II in civilian ownership. Re-acquired by War Shipping Administration 19 November 1942; To US Coast Guard as USCGC Belleville (WPC-372) 20 March 1943, decommissioned 30 June 1945. Disposed via War Shipping Administration 2 May 1946. |
| USS SC-259 | George Lawley & Son; Neponset, Boston | 15 December 1917 | Sold 24 June 1921. | Based at Plymouth, England during war |
| USS SC-260 | George Lawley & Son; Neponset, Boston | 12 January 1918 | Sold 14 October 1924. | |
| USS SC-261 | George Lawley & Son; Neponset, Boston | 9 February 1918 | Sold 20 December 1921. | |
| USS SC-262 | George Lawley & Son; Neponset, Boston | 9 February 1918 | Sold 20 December 1921. | Based at Plymouth, England during war |
| USS SC-263 | George Lawley & Son; Neponset, Boston | 9 February 1918 | Sold 20 December 1921. | |
| USS SC-264 | George Lawley & Son; Neponset, Boston | 9 February 1918 | Sold 20 December 1921. | Deployed to Azores during war. |
| USS SC-265 | George Lawley & Son; Neponset, Boston | 9 February 1918 | Sold 24 June 1921. | |
| USS SC-266 | George Lawley & Son; Neponset, Boston | 1 April 1918 | Sold 25 January 1921. | |
| USS SC-267 | George Lawley & Son; Neponset, Boston | 5 April 1918 | To War Department 18 September 1919. | |
| USS SC-268 | George Lawley & Son; Neponset, Boston | 1 April 1918 | To US Coast Guard 17 January 1919 as USCGC Adams. | Used by USCG Academy. Sold 25 May 1922. |
| USS SC-269 | George Lawley & Son; Neponset, Boston | 1 April 1918 | Sold 24 June 1921. | |
| USS SC-270 | George Lawley & Son; Neponset, Boston | 1 April 1918 | Sold 25 September 1922. | Based at Gibraltar during war |
| USS SC-271 | George Lawley & Son; Neponset, Boston | 1 April 1918 | Sold 18 June 1934. | Based at Plymouth, England during war |
| USS SC-272 | George Lawley & Son; Neponset, Boston | 7 March 1918 | Sold 24 June 1921 | Based at Plymouth, England during war |
| USS SC-273 | Mare Island Naval Shipyard; Mare Island, California | 26 March 1918 | Sold 25 September 1922. | |
| USS SC-274 | Mare Island Naval Shipyard; Mare Island, California | 30 March 1918 | To Cuba 5 November 1918 as No. 1. | Still in use for coastguard duties in 1931. |
| USS SC-275 | Mare Island Naval Shipyard; Mare Island, California | 30 March 1918 | To War Department 9 December 1919 | |
| USS SC-276 | Mare Island Naval Shipyard; Mare Island, California | 9 April 1918 | To War Department 9 December 1919 | |
| USS SC-277 | Mare Island Naval Shipyard; Mare Island, California | 9 April 1918 | Sold 25 September 1922 | Based at Azores during war. |
| USS SC-278 | Mare Island Naval Shipyard; Mare Island, California | 30 March 1918 | Sold 25 September 1922 | Based at Azores during war. |
| USS SC-279 | Mare Island Naval Shipyard; Mare Island, California | 18 April 1918 | To War Department 2 October 1919 | Sold 1922 and named Ekwood and later Stranger; Re-acquired by US Navy in November 1942 as YP-594, used by West Coast Sound Training School, San Diego; Out of service December 1944. Sold via War Shipping Organization November 1945. Civilian Stranger - lost 17 July 1948. |
| USS SC-280 | Mare Island Naval Shipyard; Mare Island, California | 18 April 1918 | To War Department 6 October 1919 | |
| USS SC-281 | Mare Island Naval Shipyard; Mare Island, California | 18 April 1918 | To War Department 6 October 1919 | |
| USS SC-282 | Mare Island Naval Shipyard; Mare Island, California | 22 April 1918 | Lost at sea 11 June 1920. | |
| USS SC-283 | Mare Island Naval Shipyard; Mare Island, California | 22 April 1918 | Sold 13 March 1922 | |
| USS SC-284 | Mare Island Naval Shipyard; Mare Island, California | 22 April 1918 | Sold 24 March 1923 | |
| USS SC-285 | Mare Island Naval Shipyard; Mare Island, California | 22 April 1918 | Sold 25 March 1927 | |
| USS SC-286 | Mare Island Naval Shipyard; Mare Island, California | 6 May 1918 | Sold 13 March 1922 | |
| USS SC-287 | Mare Island Naval Shipyard; Mare Island, California | 6 May 1918 | Sold 25 February 1924. | |
| USS SC-288 | Puget Sound Naval Shipyard; Puget Sound, Washington | 19 June 1918 | Sold 13 March 1922. | |
| USS SC-289 | Puget Sound Naval Shipyard; Puget Sound, Washington | 19 June 1918 | Sold 13 January 1921. | |
| USS SC-290 | Puget Sound Naval Shipyard; Puget Sound, Washington | 19 June 1918 | Sold 9 May 1921 | |
| USS SC-291 | Puget Sound Naval Shipyard; Puget Sound, Washington | 27 March 1918 | Sold 3 September 1920 | Took part in rescue operations when the transport USS Northern Pacific ran aground on Fire Island 1 January 1919. |
| USS SC-292 | Puget Sound Naval Shipyard; Puget Sound, Washington | 27 March 1918 | Sold 3 May 1921 | Took part in rescue operations when the transport USS Northern Pacific ran aground on Fire Island 1 January 1919. |
| USS SC-293 | Puget Sound Naval Shipyard; Puget Sound, Washington | 13 March 1918 | Sold 6 February 1922 | Took part in rescue operations when the transport USS Northern Pacific ran aground on Fire Island 1 January 1919. To Canada in civilian service. Named Etta Mac in 1931, Grant Lindsay in 1953 and Debbie Kathleen K. in 1965. Destroyed by fire 1 July 1967. |
| USS SC-294 | Puget Sound Naval Shipyard; Puget Sound, Washington | 25 March 1918 | Sold 13 March 1922. | Took part in rescue operations when the transport USS Northern Pacific ran aground on Fire Island 1 January 1919. Yacht Tenino 1922, renamed Pandora 1927. Freighter Monterey, 1940; Acquired US Navy as YP-401 and transferred to Coast Guard 22 January 1944. Returned to Navy 24 October 1945; Civil Monterey, 1946. Yacht 1949 and fishing boat 1953. Still extant 1970. |
| USS SC-295 | Puget Sound Naval Shipyard; Puget Sound, Washington | 13 April 1918 | Sold 10 April 1922. | |
| USS SC-296 | Puget Sound Naval Shipyard; Puget Sound, Washington | 13 April 1918 | Sold 3 September 1920. | Named Conquista 1920 |
| USS SC-297 | Puget Sound Naval Shipyard; Puget Sound, Washington | 13 April 1918 | Sold 25 September 1920. | |
| USS SC-298 | Puget Sound Naval Shipyard; Puget Sound, Washington | 13 April 1918 | Sold 25 September 1922. | |
| USS SC-299 | Puget Sound Naval Shipyard; Puget Sound, Washington | 25 April 1918 | Sold 25 September 1922. | |
| USS SC-300 | Puget Sound Naval Shipyard; Puget Sound, Washington | 25 April 1918 | Sold 22 June 1921. | |

== See also ==
- List of patrol vessels of the United States Navy
- List of SC-1-class subchasers (SC-1 to SC-50)
- List of SC-1-class subchasers (SC-51 to SC-100)
- List of SC-1-class subchasers (SC-101 to SC-150)
- List of SC-1-class subchasers (SC-151 to SC-200)
- List of SC-1-class subchasers (SC-201 to SC-250)
- List of SC-1-class subchasers (SC-301 to SC-350)
- List of SC-1-class subchasers (SC-351 to SC-400)
