= SS Northern Pacific =

United States passenger ship

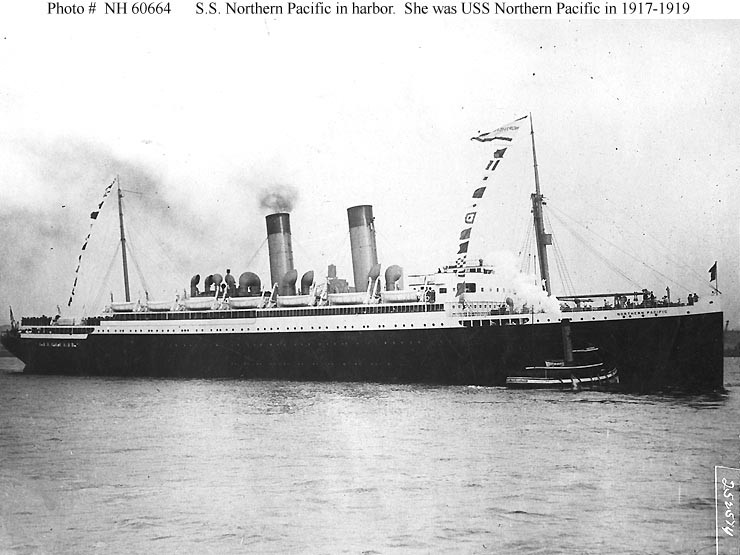
- SS Northern Pacific in harbor, probably at the time of her completion in 1914.

History

Commercial
- Name: Northern Pacific
- Owner: Spokane, Portland and Seattle Railway Company
- Builder: William Cramp & Sons, Philadelphia
- Yard number: 408
- Laid down: 23 September 1913
- Launched: 17 October 1914
- Completed: 1915
- Fate: Transferred to Navy

United States
- Name: USS Northern Pacific
- Builder: William Cramp & Sons; Philadelphia, Pennsylvania
- Laid down: 23 September 1913
- Launched: 17 October 1914
- Completed: 1915
- Acquired: 17 September 1917
- Commissioned: 3 November 1917
- Decommissioned: 20 August 1919
- Fate: Transferred to War Department for use by U.S. Army

United States
- Name: USAT Northern Pacific
- Owner: War Department
- Operator: United States Army
- Acquired: 20 August 1919
- In service: 20 August 1919
- Out of service: 22 November 1921
- Fate: Sold 2 February 1922; burned and sank during delivery, 8 February 1922

General characteristics U.S. Navy
- Type: transport
- Displacement: 9,708 t
- Length: 525 ft 8 in (160.22 m)
- Beam: 63 ft 1 in (19.23 m)
- Propulsion: steam engines
- Speed: 23 knots (43 km/h)
- Complement: 371
- Armament: 4 × 6-inch (152-mm) guns; 2 × 1-pounder guns; 2 × machine guns

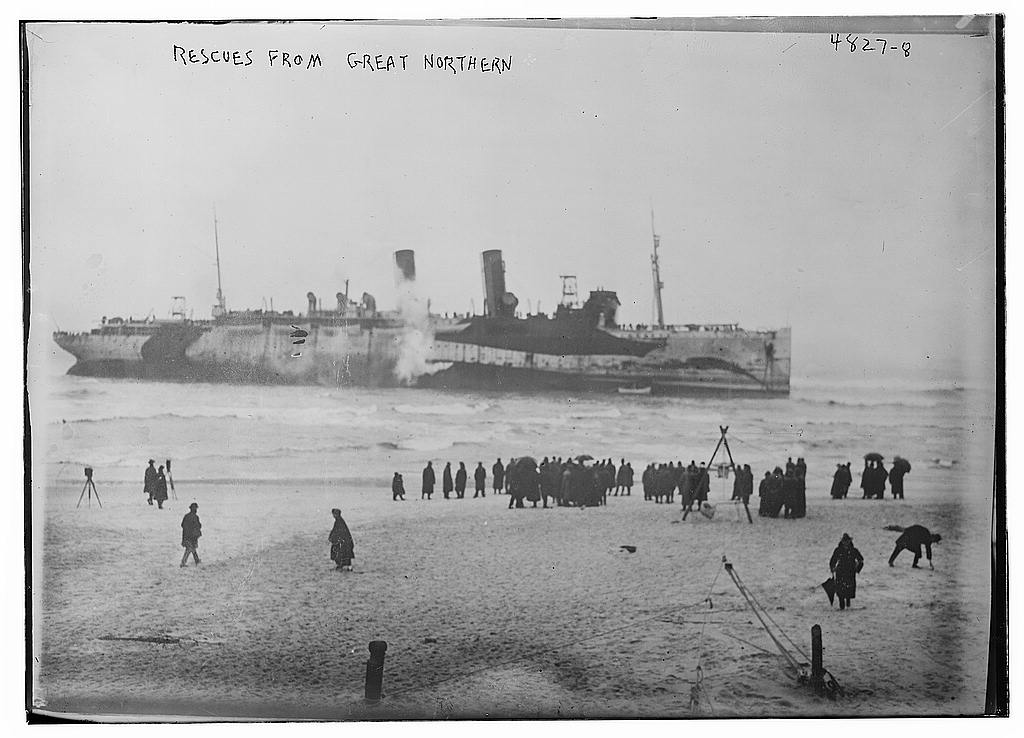
Rescue of passengers on January 2, 1919

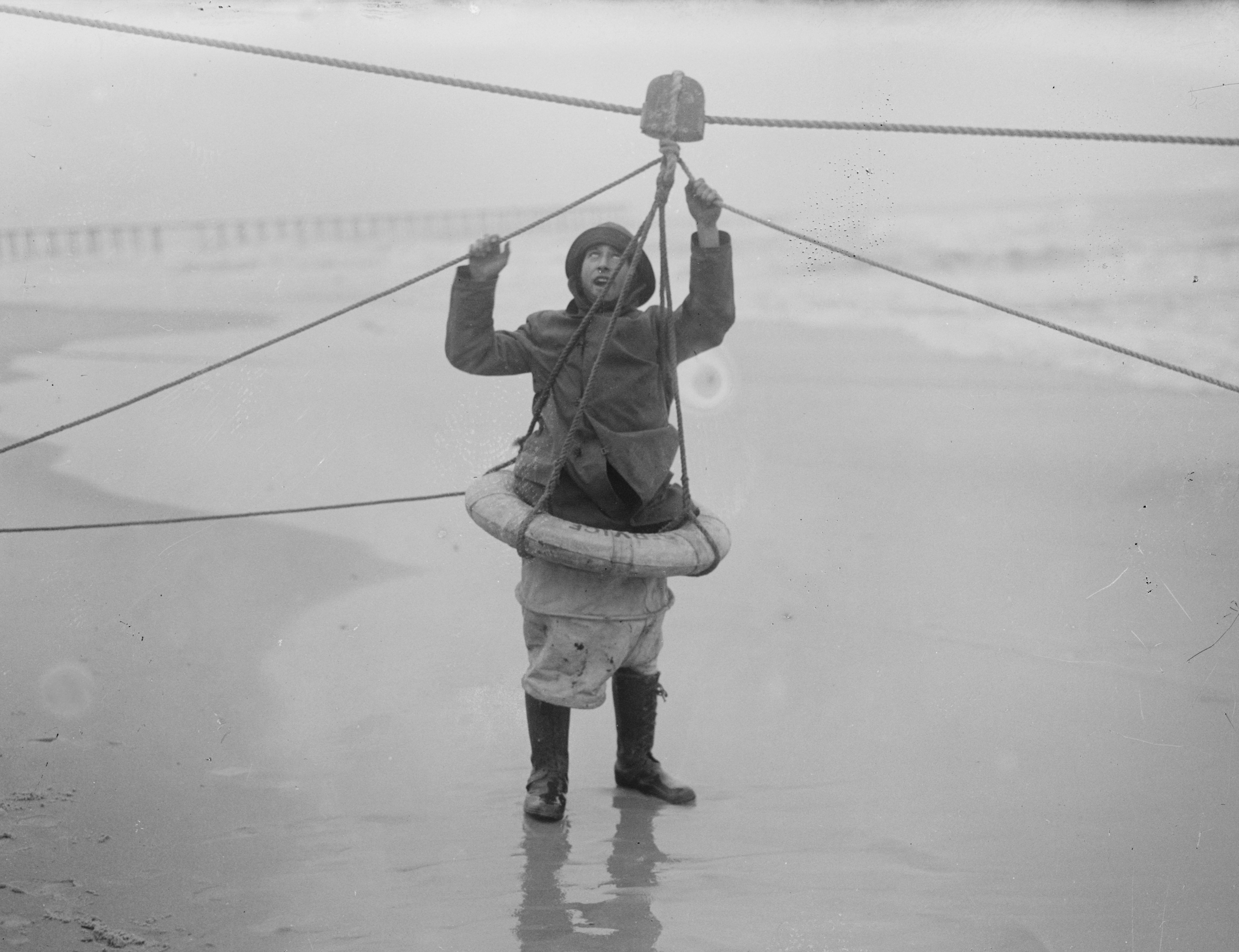
Breeches buoy during the rescue

SS Northern Pacific was built as a passenger ship at Philadelphia by William Cramp & Sons under supervision of the Great Northern Pacific Steam Ship Company for the Spokane, Portland and Seattle Railway Company. Northern Pacific, along with sister ship Great Northern, were built to provide a passenger and freight link by sea between the Great Northern Railway Lines and Spokane, Portland and Seattle Railway terminal at Astoria, Oregon and San Francisco beginning in spring of 1915. The ship was acquired on 17 September 1917 for use as a transport ship for the United States Navy during World War I, commissioned USS Northern Pacific and later, after transfer to the United States Army, as the Army transport USAT Northern Pacific. She was destroyed by fire in 1922.

== History ==
=== Commercial ===
Northern Pacific and sister ship Great Northern were built by William Cramp & Sons for the Great Northern Pacific Steam Ship Company, Astoria, Oregon to the order of the Spokane, Portland and Seattle Railway Company to serve between Astoria and San Francisco. Contracts for both ships were let on 26 April 1913 with keel laying for Northern Pacific on 23 September 1913, the day after Great Northern, and launch on 17 October 1914 with service due to start in March 1915.

Both ships were designed for 856 passengers and 2,185 tons of freight with a 23 knot speed making possible the run between the ports in 25–26 hours, equal to the time for an overland route, under favorable conditions and thus allowing direct service to San Francisco from the east using Great Northern Railway Lines. Both ships were classed A100 according to British Lloyds and met the latest requirements of the United States Steamboat Inspection Service.

Design specifications were for a 8,255 GRT ship with 524 ft (159.7 m) length overall, 500 ft (152.4 m) length between perpendiculars, 63 ft (19.2 m) beam, 21 ft (6.4 m) full load draft, 50 ft 8 in (15.4 m) depth molded to A deck with 2,185 DWT and approximately 200,000 cubic feet of cargo space. The 856 passenger capacity was broken down into 550 first class, 108 second class and 198 third class served by a crew of 198. The double bottomed hull was divided into eleven watertight compartments with ten extending to the bottom of second deck above full load waterline.

Twelve Babcock & Wilcox water tube boilers provided steam for Parsons turbines on three shafts with a requirement that the 23 knot speed be available with steam from only ten boilers. One high-pressure turbine 21 ft 7.5 in (6.6 m) long with 5 ft 8 in (1.7 m) diameter rotor drum with four stages of expansion and two low-pressure turbines, with integrated astern and each 32 ft 2 in (9.8 m) long with 7 ft 8 in (2.3 m) ahead and 6 ft 7 in (2.0 m) astern diameter rotor drums, develop about 25,000 shaft horsepower at 325 revolutions. Four 35 kilowatt, 110 volt steam driven Diehl Manufacturing Company generators provided electric power for lighting and auxiliary electric machinery.

Northern Pacific departed Philadelphia for San Francisco with all reservations taken on 25 March 1915.

=== Navy and Army service ===
She was acquired by the United States Shipping Board (USSB) from the Spokane, Portland and Seattle Railway of Portland, Oregon, on 17 September 1917 and commissioned on 3 November 1917 at Bremerton, Washington.

Northern Pacific departed San Francisco on 7 March for New York via the Panama Canal. Joining the Cruiser and Transport Squadron during the war, Northern Pacific operated between the Army's Hoboken Port of Embarkation, Hoboken, New Jersey and Brest, France, making a total of 13 trips taking 22,645 troops and passengers to France and returning 9,532 to the United States. The influenza epidemic hit the ship hard in September 1918 en route to Brest. Cots were set up in the brig and in the open corridors. There were 7 deaths. On 2 October, sister ship USS Great Northern collided with the British ship Brinkburn, which caused Great Northern to lose contact with the convoy. Northern Pacific searched and found her sister seaworthy enough to rejoin the convoy.

Northern Pacific ran aground off Fire Island, New York on 1 January 1919 with 2,481 soldiers aboard. Her troops were transferred to other ships or, in cases ashore, on 3–4 January by use of Submarine Chasers to transfer troops from the grounded ship. The evacuation was under the supervision of Lieutenant George R. Le Sauvage and involved SC-291, SC-292, SC-293 and SC-294 along with other small vessels that transported troops to the hospital ship Solace, cruisers and destroyers standing off shore. The last troops were evacuated on the afternoon of Saturday, 4 January. Northern Pacific was refloated on 18 January, and proceeded to Staten Island. She was decommissioned on 20 August 1919 and was transferred to the Army Transport Service (ATS) on that date.

USAT Northern Pacific was assigned to the ATS Pacific Fleet and homeported at Fort Mason in San Francisco. On 12 September 1919 the ship departed for Siberia in order to transport the American Expeditionary Force Siberia to the Philippines.

On 9 May 1920, USAT Northern Pacific ran aground on Collnas Shoal at the entrance to the harbor at San Juan, Puerto Rico, while carrying General of the Armies John J. Pershing on an inspection tour of troops and military installations on the island. The ship was re-floated with significant effort led by LCDR Virgil Baker, a retired U.S. Navy lieutenant commander who was formerly commander of the San Geronimo Naval Reservation, and was back underway on 10 May 1920.

By 1920 the Army found both Northern Pacific and Great Northern too fast and too expensive to operate in peacetime and was attempting to lease them to private operators.

== Sale and loss ==
Northern Pacific was returned to the USSB on 22 November 1921 and laid up in its New York reserve fleet. She was sold to the Pacific Steamship Company on 2 February 1922, but while being towed to their yard for reconditioning at Chester, Pennsylvania, she caught fire, burned, capsized, and sank in 150 feet (46 m) of water 30 nautical miles (56 km; 35 mi) south of Cape May, New Jersey, on 8 February 1922. Four draftsmen on board died.

== Bibliography ==
- Clay, Steven E. (2011). U. S. Army Order Of Battle 1919–1941 (PDF). Volume 4. The Services: Quartermaster, Medical, Military Police, Signal Corps, Chemical Warfare, And Miscellaneous Organizations, 1919–41. Vol. 4. Fort Leavenworth, Kansas: Combat Studies Institute Press. p. 2173. ISBN 978-0-9841901-4-0. LCCN 2010022326. Archived from the original (PDF) on September 16, 2012.
- "S.S. Great Northern and Northern Pacific". International Marine Engineering. XIX (December 1914). Aldrich Publishing Company: 535–545. 1914.
- Koppel, Harwood (1919). "Motor Boats Rescue Thousands of Soldiers". Motor Boating. 23 (February 1919). New York: 14–15.
- Naval History And Heritage Command. "Northern Pacific". Dictionary of American Naval Fighting Ships. Naval History And Heritage Command.
- Spokane Daily Chronicle (25 March 1915). "New Steamship Sails for Frisco". Spokane Daily Chronicle. 29 (25 March 1915): 6.
- Transport Service of the Government: Hearings Before the Committee on the Merchant Marine and Fisheries, House of Representatives, Sixty-Seventh Congress. Washington, D.C.: Government Printing Office. 1921.
