= List of SC-1-class subchasers (SC-51 to SC-100) =

The SC-1 class was a large class of submarine chasers built during World War I for the United States Navy. They were ordered in very large numbers in order to combat attacks by German U-boats, with 442 vessels built from 1917 to 1919. This article lists details of the second 50 ships of the class.

== Ships ==
Number	Builder	Commissioned	Fate	Notes
USS SC-51	New York Navy Yard	23 April 1918	Sold 24 June 1921.	
USS SC-52	New York Navy Yard	23 April 1918	Sold 24 June 1921.	
USS SC-53	New York Navy Yard	30 April 1918	Scuttled by burning 1920.	
USS SC-54	New York Navy Yard	11 May 1918	Sold 24 June 1921.	
USS SC-55	New York Navy Yard	3 November 1917	Sold 24 June 1921.	
USS SC-56	New York Navy Yard	6 May 1918	Sold 24 June 1921.	
USS SC-57	New York Navy Yard	6 May 1918	Sold 12 December 1935.	
USS SC-58	New York Navy Yard	6 May 1918	Burned 2 May 1919.	
USS SC-59	New York Navy Yard	11 May 1918	Sold 24 June 1921.	
USS SC-60	New York Navy Yard	May 1918	Sunk in collision 1 October 1918.	Sunk in collision with tanker off New York. 2 Killed.
USS SC-61	New York Navy Yard	16 May 1918	Sold 24 June 1921.	Served in North American waters during World War I, arriving at the Azores after the war's end.
USS SC-62	New York Navy Yard	11 May 1918	Sold 6 March 1922.	Based in Azores during the war.
USS SC-63	New York Navy Yard	16 May 1918	Sold 22 July 1931.	Based in Azores during the war.
USS SC-64	New York Navy Yard	16 May 1918	Sold 11 March 1943.	Based in Azores during the war. Converted to water tanker. Renamed YW-97 on 30 November 1942.
USS SC-65	Mathis Yacht Building	1 November 1917	To France as C-13.	
USS SC-66	Mathis Yacht Building	1 November 1917	To France as C-14.	
USS SC-67	Mathis Yacht Building	22 December 1917	To France as C-22.	
USS SC-68	Mathis Yacht Building	15 March 1918	To US Coast Guard 15 January 1920 as USCGC Hansen.	Sold 27 April 1927.
USS SC-69	Mathis Yacht Building	16 February 1918	Sold 9 December 1922.	
USS SC-70	Mathis Yacht Building	16 February 1918	To US Coast Guard 15 January 1920 as USCGC Newbury	Sold 11 December 1925.
USS SC-71	Mathis Yacht Building	28 March 1918	Sold 26 May 1921.	
USS SC-72	Mathis Yacht Building	21 March 1918	Sold 4 November 1921.	
USS SC-73	Mathis Yacht Building	20 March 1918	Sold 26 May 1921.	
USS SC-74	Mathis Yacht Building	20 March 1918	Sold 26 May 1921.	
USS SC-75	Hiltebrant Dry Dock Co., Kingston New York	1 November 1917	To France as C-16.	
USS SC-76	Hiltebrant Dry Dock Co., Kingston New York	1 November 1917	To France as C-15.	
USS SC-77	Hiltebrant Dry Dock Co., Kingston New York	5 December 1917	Sold 24 June 1921.	Served in France during war.
USS SC-78	Hiltebrant Dry Dock Co., Kingston New York	14 November 1917	Sold June 1919.	Served on Otranto Barrage.
USS SC-79	Hiltebrant Dry Dock Co., Kingston New York	5 December 1917	Sold 24 June 1921.	Served in North American waters.
USS SC-80	Hiltebrant Dry Dock Co., Kingston New York	18 December 1917	Sold 24 June 1921.	Served in Mediterranean.
USS SC-81	Hiltebrant Dry Dock Co., Kingston New York	18 December 1917	Sank 6 August 1920.	Served in France during war. Sunk near Charleston, South Carolina.
USS SC-82	Hiltebrant Dry Dock Co., Kingston New York	21 February 1918	Sold June 1919.	
USS SC-83	Hiltebrant Dry Dock Co., Kingston New York	21 February 1918	Sold 24 June 1921.	Based at Plymouth, England during war.
USS SC-84	Hiltebrant Dry Dock Co., Kingston New York	21 February 1918	Sank 6 August 1920.	Sunk near Charleston, South Carolina.
USS SC-85	Hiltebrant Dry Dock Co., Kingston New York	21 February 1918	Sold 24 June 1921.	Based at Plymouth, England during war.
USS SC-86	Hiltebrant Dry Dock Co., Kingston New York	21 February 1918	Sold 24 June 1921.	Based at Plymouth, England during war.
USS SC-87	Hiltebrant Dry Dock Co., Kingston New York	21 February 1918	Sold 24 June 1921.	Based at Plymouth, England during war.
USS SC-88	Hiltebrant Dry Dock Co., Kingston New York	1 March 1918	Sold 24 June 1921.	
USS SC-89	Hiltebrant Dry Dock Co., Kingston New York	1 March 1918	Sold 24 June 1921.	
USS SC-90	Elco; Bayonne, New Jersey	14 November 1917	Sold 11 August 1920.	Served on Otranto Barrage.
USS SC-91	Elco; Bayonne, New Jersey	5 December 1917	Sold 24 June 1921.	Served in European waters, based at Queenstown (now Cobh) and Plymouth.
USS SC-92	Elco; Bayonne, New Jersey	5 December 1917	Sold 24 June 1921.	Served on Otranto Barrage.
USS SC-93	Elco; Bayonne, New Jersey	5 December 1917	Sold 24 June 1921.	Served on Otranto Barrage.
USS SC-94	Elco; Bayonne, New Jersey	24 December 1917	Sold 1919.	Served in Mediterranean, based at Corfu.
USS SC-95	Elco; Bayonne, New Jersey	24 December 1917	Sold 1919.	Deployed to Arkhangelsk in North Russia in June–July 1918 along with SC-256 and SC-354.
USS SC-96	Elco; Bayonne, New Jersey	18 December 1917	Sold 4 March 1924.	Served in Mediterranean, based at Corfu.
USS SC-97	Elco; Bayonne, New Jersey	18 January 1918	Sold 24 June 1921.	Served in European waters (based at Plymouth) during war.
USS SC-98	Elco; Bayonne, New Jersey	19 February 1918	Sold 14 October 1924.	Took part in minesweeping operations in North Sea in 1919.
USS SC-99	Elco; Bayonne, New Jersey	3 March 1918	Sold 11 May 1921.	
USS SC-100	Elco; Bayonne, New Jersey	2 March 1918	Sold 24 June 1921.	Served in European waters (based at Plymouth) during war.

== See also ==
- List of patrol vessels of the United States Navy
- List of SC-1-class subchasers (SC-1 to SC-50)
- List of SC-1-class subchasers (SC-101 to SC-150)
- List of SC-1-class subchasers (SC-151 to SC-200)
- List of SC-1-class subchasers (SC-201 to SC-250)
- List of SC-1-class subchasers (SC-251 to SC-300)
- List of SC-1-class subchasers (SC-301 to SC-350)
- List of SC-1-class subchasers (SC-351 to SC-400)
- List of SC-1-class subchasers (SC-401 to SC-448)
