= SS Great Northern =

Passenger ship built in 1914

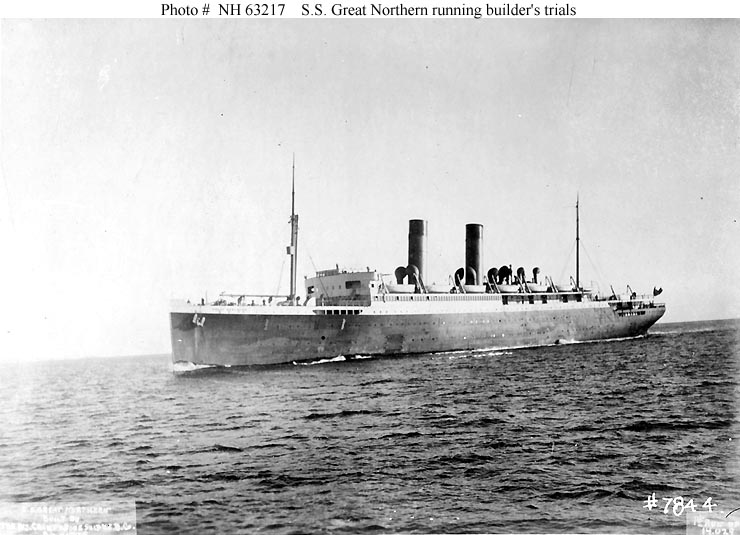
- Great Northern running builder's trials, c. late 1914 or early 1915

History

United States
- Name: 1915: Great Northern; 1917: USS Great Northern (ID-4569); 1919: USAT Great Northern; 1921: USS Great Northern (AG-9); 1921: USS Columbia (AG-9); 1922: H. F. Alexander; 1942: USAT George S. Simonds
- Namesake: Great Northern Railway
- Operator: 1915: Spokane, Portland and Seattle Railway Company; 1917: U.S. Navy; 1919: U.S. Army; 1921: U.S. Navy; 1922: Pacific Steamship Company; 1942: U.S. Army
- Awarded: 26 April 1913
- Builder: William Cramp & Sons, Philadelphia
- Yard number: 407
- Laid down: 22 September 1913
- Launched: 7 July 1914
- Completed: April 1915
- In service: April 1915
- Out of service: Entered reserve fleet at Lee Hall, Virginia 5 March 1946
- Fate: Sold to Boston Metals Company on 25 February 1948

General characteristics
- Type: Passenger ship
- Tonnage: 8,255 GRT
- Length: 509 ft 6 in (155.30 m)
- Beam: 63 ft 1 in (19.23 m)
- Draft: 21 ft (6.4 m)
- Speed: 23 kn (26 mph; 43 km/h)
- Complement: 559 (Navy)
- Armament: 4 × 6-inch (150 mm) guns (Navy)

Great Northern was a passenger ship built at Philadelphia by William Cramp & Sons under supervision of the Great Northern Pacific Steam Ship Company for the Spokane, Portland and Seattle Railway Company, itself a joint venture of the Great Northern Railway and Northern Pacific Railway. Great Northern, along with sister ship Northern Pacific, were built to provide a passenger and freight link by sea between the northern transcontinental rail lines via the Spokane, Portland and Seattle Railway terminal at Astoria, Oregon and San Francisco beginning in spring of 1915.

The ship was acquired for military service in September 1917 and served as USS Great Northern (AG-9), USAT Great Northern and USS Columbia before returning to commercial Pacific Coast service as H. F. Alexander. In 1942 the ship was acquired by the War Shipping Administration and again became an Army transport, USAT George S. Simonds. After layup in the reserve fleet 5 March 1946 the ship was sold to Boston Metals Company on 25 February 1948 for scrapping.

== Construction and design ==
Great Northern and sister ship Northern Pacific were built by William Cramp & Sons for the Great Northern Pacific Steam Ship Company, Astoria, Oregon to the order of the Spokane, Portland and Seattle Railway Company to serve between Astoria and San Francisco. The Spokane, Portland and Seattle Railway line itself was a joint venture between the Great Northern Railway and the Northern Pacific Railway that would give two ships their names. Contracts for both ships were let on 26 April 1913 with keel laying for Great Northern on 22 September 1913 and launch on 7 July 1914 with service due to start in March 1915.

Both ships were designed for 856 passengers and 2,185 tons of freight with a 23-knot speed making possible the run between the ports in 25–26 hours, equal to the time for an overland route, under favorable conditions and thus allowing direct service to San Francisco from the east using the two northern rail lines. Both ships were classed A100 according to British Lloyds and met the latest requirements of the U.S. Steamboat Inspection Service.

Design specifications were for a 8,255 GRT ship with 524 ft (159.7 m) length overall, 500 ft (152.4 m) length between perpendiculars, 63 ft (19.2 m) beam, 21 ft (6.4 m) full load draft, 50 ft 8 in (15.4 m) depth molded to A deck with 2,185 DWT and approximately 200,000 cubic feet of cargo space. The 856-passenger capacity was broken down into 550 first class, 108 second class and 198 third class served by a crew of 198. The double-bottomed hull was divided into eleven watertight compartments with ten extending to the bottom of the second deck above full load waterline.

Twelve Babcock & Wilcox water tube boilers provided steam for Parsons turbines on three shafts with a requirement that the 23-knot speed be available with steam from only ten boilers. One high-pressure turbine 21 ft 7.5 in (6.6 m) long with 5-foot-8-inch-diameter (1.7 m) rotor drum with four stages of expansion and two low-pressure turbines, with integrated astern and each 32 ft 2 in (9.8 m) long with 7 feet 8 inches (2.3 m) ahead and 6-foot-7-inch-astern-diameter (2.0 m) rotor drums, develop about 25,000 shaft horsepower at 325 revolutions. Four 35-kilowatt, 110-volt, steam-driven Diehl Manufacturing Company generators provided electric power for lighting and auxiliary electric machinery.

== Commercial service 1915–1917 ==
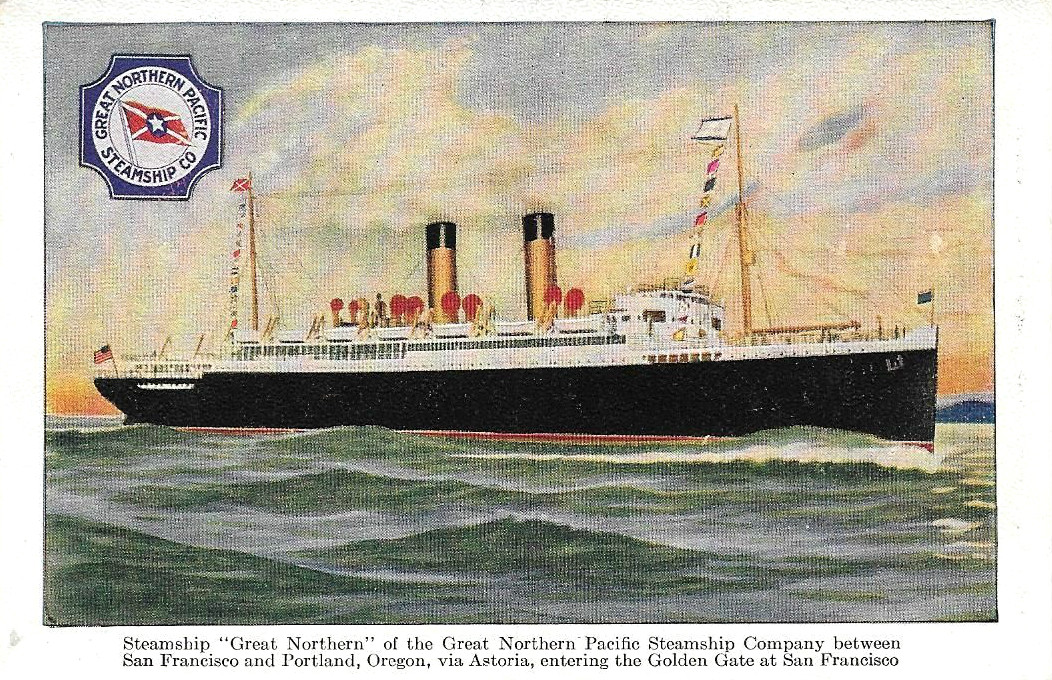
Great Northern Pacific Steamship Company postcard for sending messages written on board Great Northern

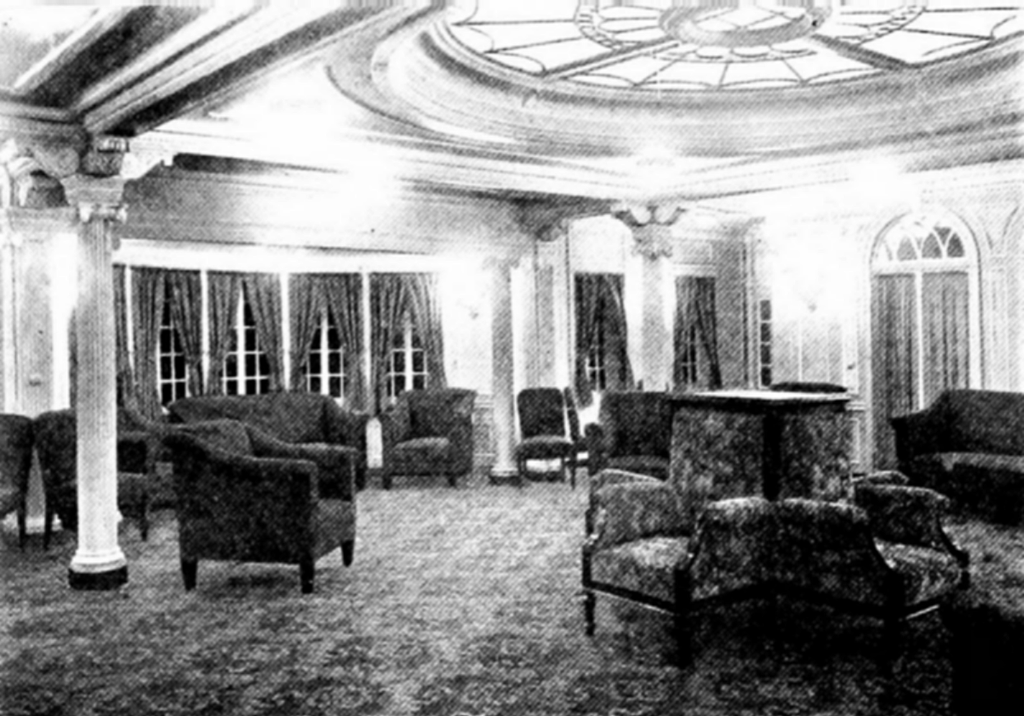
Great Northern's Observation Room

During summer Great Northern, advertised with her sister as "Palaces of the Pacific," was engaged in the Astoria to San Francisco service. The service was inaugurated during the Panama–Pacific International Exposition with a schedule of departure from Portland by steamer train with a three and a half hour trip to the pier in Astoria departing at 1:30 p.m. on the 26-hour trip to San Francisco, scheduled to arrive at Pier 25 of the Greenwich Street wharf at 3:30 p.m. starting 25 March. In winter Great Northern changed to a luxury service to Hawaii on a route of San Francisco–San Pedro–Hilo–Honolulu with passage out taking four days with the stop in Hilo long enough for a volcano visit by tourists. The two ships maintained into 1917 the Great Northern Railway's sea link between the sights of the northwestern states and California with advertisements of the parks and sights connected by the railroad and the ship's link to San Francisco.

== Military service 1917–1922 ==
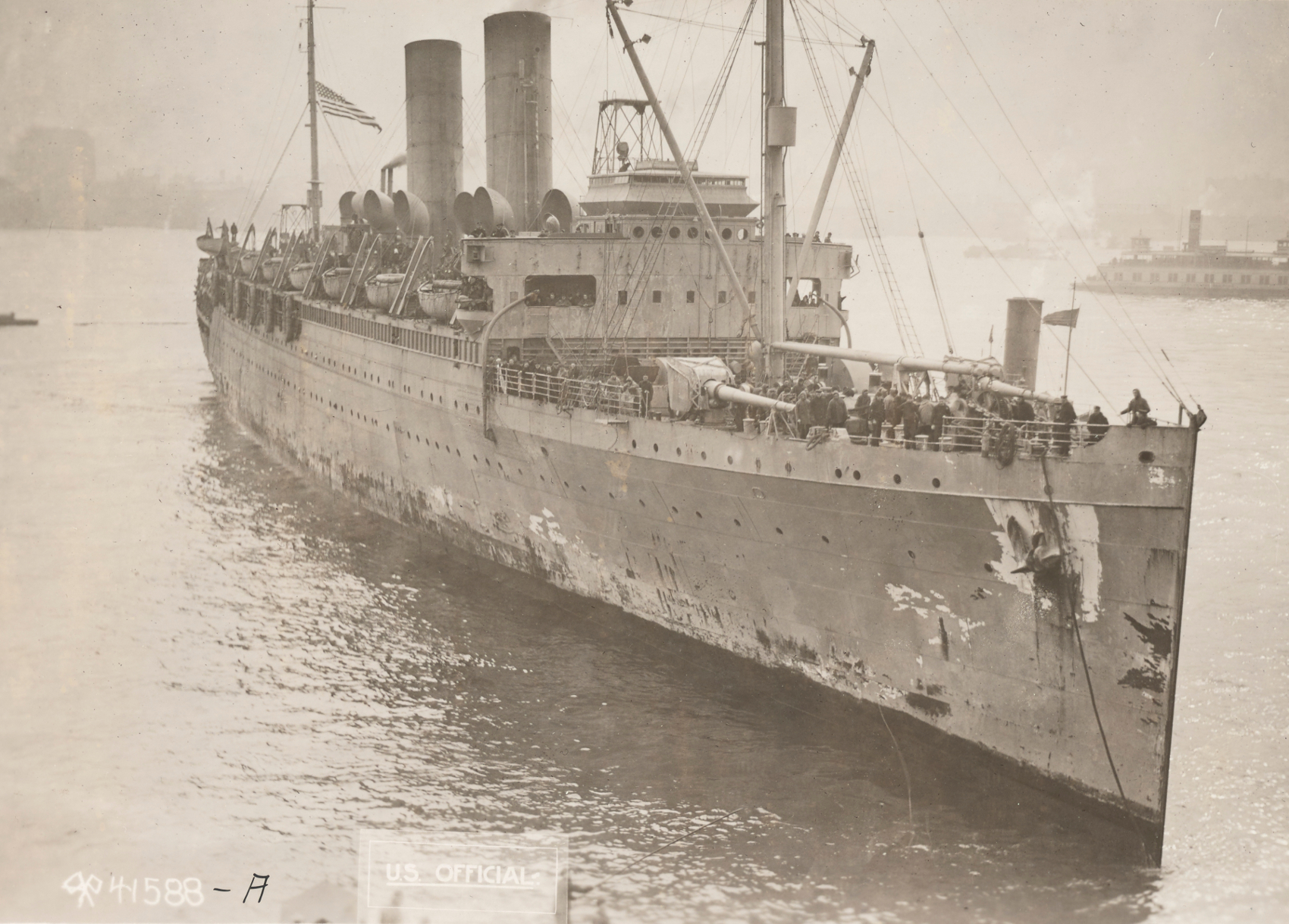
USS Great Northern as an armed transport returning U.S. troops in 1919

The entry of the United States into World War I brought the end of the ship's commercial service with wartime service as a fast troop transport.

=== Navy ===
Great Northern was acquired from her owners on 19 September 1917, by the United States Shipping Board; converted to a transport at the Puget Sound Navy Yard; and commissioned as USS Great Northern (ID-4569) on 1 November 1917. Six officers and men of the civilian crew joined the Navy to serve on board.

Embarking nearly 1,400 passengers at Puget Sound, including 500 "enemy aliens," women and children as well as men, Great Northern sailed for the U.S. East Coast on 21 January 1918, reaching New York City on 9 February via the Panama Canal and Charleston, South Carolina. On 7 March, she sailed from the Army's then Hoboken Port of Embarkation, later designated the New York Port of Embarkation, for Brest, France, with 1,500 members of the American Expeditionary Force (AEF). Great Northern returned to Hoboken on 30 March with wounded veterans. From then until August 1919, she made a total of 18 transatlantic voyages, first carrying troops to the fighting zones and then bringing home the victorious "doughboys". Great Northern decommissioned at New York on 15 August 1919 and was transferred to the U.S. Army Transportation Service the same day.

=== Army ===
Great Northern was transferred to the Army Transport Service (ATS) on 15 August 1919. USAT Great Northern was home ported at the New York Port of Embarkation 1919–1920 and then transferred to Fort Mason in San Francisco for Pacific service and home ported there 1920–1921. In February 1920 the ship transported Y.M.C.A. and Red Cross workers from Vladivostok to San Francisco and in April transported approximately 3,000 American officers and men of the American Expeditionary Force, Siberia from Siberia to the Philippines. Great Northern also took a Congressional party on a long Pacific inspection, touching at Hong Kong, Honolulu, Cavite, and then returning to San Francisco, California in the summer of 1920. The ship was laid up at San Francisco on 1 November 1920. By this time the Army found both Great Northern and Northern Pacific, then laid up in New York, too fast and too expensive to operate in peacetime and was attempting to lease them to private operators. Great Northern was turned over to the Navy by Executive Order on 29 July 1921.

=== Navy and rename ===
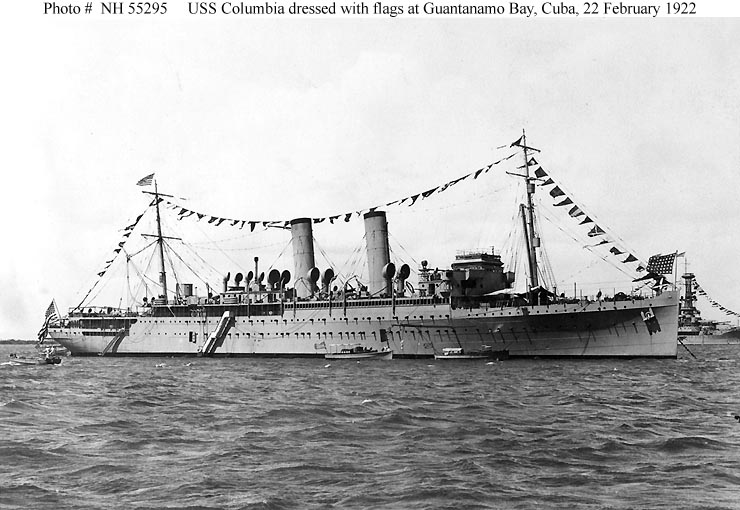
USS Columbia (AG-9) At Guantanamo Bay, Cuba, dressed with flags for George Washington's Birthday, 22 February 1922. This ship served as USS Great Northern in 1917–1919.

The ship was reacquired by the Navy from the War Department 3 August 1921 and commissioned 11 August as Great Northern (AG-9). On 19 November 1921, Great Northern's name was changed by Presidential order to Columbia to honor a name long famous in Navy annals. She remained in New York Harbor, functioning as a floating command post, through the rest of 1921. Columbia sailed for the Caribbean to join the annual Atlantic Fleet winter exercises on 7 January 1922, reaching Guantánamo Bay, Cuba, via Charleston and Key West, Florida on 18 January. Three days later she joined the battleships Wyoming, Arkansas, North Dakota and Delaware at Guantanamo Bay.

Columbia sailed north on 24 February, reaching New York on 27 February. That same day, Admiral Jones shifted his flag to Maryland, and Columbia sailed for Chester, Pennsylvania. She decommissioned there on 4 March 1922 and was transferred to the U.S. Shipping Board.

== Commercial service 1922–1942 ==
The ship returned to merchant service with Admiral Lines' Pacific Steamship Company under the name H. F. Alexander as the line's flagship, noted in 1933 as the fastest coastwise vessel in the American Merchant Marine.

== World War II service ==
On 25 July 1942 she was taken over by the War Shipping Administration and transferred to the Army under bareboat charter as the troop transport USAT George S. Simonds. Simonds had a capacity for 1,803 troops and was one of the U.S. Army Transports carrying troops to Normandy from England in June 1944. The ship went into the reserve fleet at Lee Hall, Virginia, 5 March 1946 and was sold to Boston Metals Company on 25 February 1948.

== Bibliography ==
- Advertisement (Daily Colonist) (1915). "Columbia River and Pacific Ocean De Luxe". The Daily Colonist (March 24, 1915). Victoria, British Columbia, Canada: The Colonist Printing & Publishing Company: 10.
- Advertisement (Travel) (1917). "Glacier Has Something More". Travel (May 1917). New York, New York: Travel Club of America.
- Castle, William Richards (1917). Hawaii Past and Present. New York: Dodd, Mead and Company. p. 2153. LCCN 17005138.
- Clay, Steven E. (2011). U. S. Army Order Of Battle 1919-1941 (PDF). Volume 4. The Services: Quartermaster, Medical, Military Police, Signal Corps, Chemical Warfare, And Miscellaneous Organizations, 1919-41. Vol. 4. Fort Leavenworth, KS: Combat Studies Institute Press. ISBN 9780984190140. LCCN 2010022326. Archived from the original (PDF) on September 16, 2012.
- "S.S. Great Northern and Northern Pacific". International Marine Engineering. XIX (December 1914). Aldrich Publishing Company: 535–545. 1914.
- Maritime Administration. "H. F. Alexander". Ship History Database Vessel Status Card. U.S. Department of Transportation, Maritime Administration. Archived from the original on July 25, 2014.
- Naval History And Heritage Command. "Great Northern". Dictionary of American Naval Fighting Ships. Naval History And Heritage Command.
- "Pacific Marine Review". Pacific Marine Review. Consolidated 1933 issues (January). 'Official Organ: Pacific American Steamship Association/Shipowners' Association of the Pacific Coast: 1. 1933.
- Romig, Donald King (January 9, 1919). The United States Ship Great Northern—History of a Troop Transport. Brooklyn: Eagle press. LCCN 19002560.
- U.S. Army Transportation Museum. "OPERATION MULBERRY (D-Day 1944)". U.S. Army Transportation Museum.
- United States Congress; House Committee on Merchant Marine and Fisheries (1921). Transport Service of the Government: Hearings Before the Committee on the Merchant Marine and Fisheries, House of Representatives, Sixty-Seventh Congress. Washington, DC: Government Printing Office.
- Gillman, L. C. (1923). "The Spokane, Portland and Seattle Railroad Company". The Washington Historical Quarterly. 14 (January). University Station, Seattle: The Washington State University State Historical Society.
