= List of SC-1-class subchasers (SC-351 to SC-400) =

The SC-1 class was a large class of submarine chasers built during World War I for the United States Navy. They were ordered in very large numbers in order to combat attacks by German U-boats, with 442 vessels built from 1917 to 1919. This article lists details of the eighth group of 50 ships of the class.

== Ships ==
Number	Builder	Commissioned	Fate	Notes
USS SC-351	College Point Boat; College Point, Queens	8 January 1918	Sold 19 October 1920	Based at Plymouth and Bordeaux during war.
USS SC-352	College Point Boat; College Point, Queens	2 March 1918	Sold 24 June 1921	Based at Plymouth during war.
USS SC-353	College Point Boat; College Point, Queens	20 March 1918	Sold 18 March 1936.	Operated in European waters during war. Redesignated PC-353 in 1920, and decommissioned same year. Recommissioned as survey vessel operating in Cuban waters in 1922.
USS SC-354	College Point Boat; College Point, Queens	2 March 1918	Sold 24 June 1921.	Deployed to Arkhangelsk in North Russia in June–July 1918 along with SC-256 and SC-95. Renamed Frankie and Rose 1921; Fishing boat 353 in 1927; Fishing boat Frank W. Wilkisson in 1931.
USS SC-355	College Point Boat; College Point, Queens	12 March 1918	Sold 13 March 1922.	
USS SC-356	College Point Boat; College Point, Queens	8 April 1918	Sold 24 June 1921.	Based at Plymouth and Queenstown (now Cobh), Ireland during war Took part in sweeping of Northern Barrage in 1919
USS SC-357	College Point Boat; College Point, Queens	9 June 1918	To France as C-54	
USS SC-358	College Point Boat; College Point, Queens	9 June 1918	To France as C-56	
USS SC-359	College Point Boat; College Point, Queens	9 June 1918	To France as C-60	
USS SC-360	College Point Boat; College Point, Queens	27 September 1918	To France as C-73	
USS SC-361	College Point Boat; College Point, Queens	9 June 1918	To France as C-57	
USS SC-362	College Point Boat; College Point, Queens	9 June 1918	To France as C-49	
USS SC-363	Elco; Bayonne, New Jersey	9 June 1918	To France as C-50	
USS SC-364	Elco; Bayonne, New Jersey	9 June 1918	To France as C-51	
USS SC-365	Gibbs Gas Engine Company; Jacksonville, Florida	9 June 1918	To France as C-70.	
USS SC-366	Gibbs Gas Engine Company; Jacksonville, Florida	9 June 1918	To France as C-71.	
USS SC-367	Gibbs Gas Engine Company; Jacksonville, Florida	9 June 1918	To France as C-72.	
USS SC-368	Gibbs Gas Engine Company; Jacksonville, Florida	24 October 1918	To France as C-95.	Still in service at start of World War II in 1939. Paid-off for scrap early 1940.
USS SC-369	Gibbs Gas Engine Company; Jacksonville, Florida	24 October 1918	To France as C-96.	
USS SC-370	Gibbs Gas Engine Company; Jacksonville, Florida	24 October 1918	To France as C-97.	
USS SC-371	Hiltebrant Dry Dock Co. Kingston, New York	9 June 1918	To France as C-61.	
USS SC-372	Hiltebrant Dry Dock Co. Kingston, New York	9 June 1918	To France as C-58.	Still in service at start of World War II in 1939. Paid-off for scrap early 1940.
USS SC-373	Hiltebrant Dry Dock Co. Kingston, New York	9 June 1918	To France as C-62.	
USS SC-374	Hiltebrant Dry Dock Co. Kingston, New York	9 June 1918	To France as C-52.	
USS SC-375	Hiltebrant Dry Dock Co. Kingston, New York	9 June 1918	To France as C-55.	
USS SC-376	Kyle & Purdy; City Island, Bronx	27 September 1918	To France as C-74.	Still in service at start of World War II in 1939. Paid-off for scrap early 1940.
USS SC-377	Kyle & Purdy; City Island, Bronx	9 June 1918	To France as C-59.	
USS SC-378	Kyle & Purdy; City Island, Bronx	9 June 1918	To France as C-63.	
USS SC-379	Kyle & Purdy; City Island, Bronx	9 June 1918	To France as C-73.	
USS SC-380	Kyle & Purdy; City Island, Bronx	27 September 1918	To France as C-75.	
USS SC-381	Mathis Yacht Building; Camden, New Jersey	9 June 1918	To France as C-64.	
USS SC-382	Mathis Yacht Building; Camden, New Jersey	9 June 1918	To France as C-69.	
USS SC-383	Mathis Yacht Building; Camden, New Jersey	27 September 1918	To France as C-76.	
USS SC-384	Mathis Yacht Building; Camden, New Jersey	27 September 1918	To France as C-77.	
USS SC-385	Mathis Yacht Building; Camden, New Jersey	24 October 1918	To France as C-80.	
USS SC-386	Matthews Boat; Port Clinton, Ohio	24 October 1918	To France as C-64.	
USS SC-387	Matthews Boat; Port Clinton, Ohio	24 October 1918	To France as C-82.	
USS SC-388	Matthews Boat; Port Clinton, Ohio	24 October 1918	To France as C-90.	
USS SC-389	Matthews Boat; Port Clinton, Ohio	24 October 1918	To France as C-91.	
USS SC-390	Matthews Boat; Port Clinton, Ohio	24 October 1918	To France as C-92.	
USS SC-391	Matthews Boat; Port Clinton, Ohio	24 October 1918	To France as C-93.	
USS SC-392	Matthews Boat; Port Clinton, Ohio	24 October 1918	To France as C-89.	
USS SC-393	New York Yacht, Launch & Engine; Morris Heights, Bronx	9 June 1918	To France as C-66.	
USS SC-394	New York Yacht, Launch & Engine; Morris Heights, Bronx	9 June 1918	To France as C-65.	
USS SC-395	New York Yacht, Launch & Engine; Morris Heights, Bronx	9 June 1918	To France as C-67.	
USS SC-396	New York Yacht, Launch & Engine; Morris Heights, Bronx	9 June 1918	To France as C-68.	
USS SC-397	New York Yacht, Launch & Engine; Morris Heights, Bronx	27 September 1918	To France as C-78.	
USS SC-398	New York Yacht, Launch & Engine; Morris Heights, Bronx	24 October 1918	To France as C-79.	
USS SC-399	New York Yacht, Launch & Engine; Morris Heights, Bronx	24 October 1918	To France as C-83.	
USS SC-400	New York Yacht, Launch & Engine; Morris Heights, Bronx	24 October 1918	To France as C-86.	

== See also ==
- List of patrol vessels of the United States Navy
- List of SC-1-class subchasers (SC-1 to SC-50)
- List of SC-1-class subchasers (SC-51 to SC-100)
- List of SC-1-class subchasers (SC-101 to SC-150)
- List of SC-1-class subchasers (SC-151 to SC-200)
- List of SC-1-class subchasers (SC-201 to SC-250)
- List of SC-1-class subchasers (SC-251 to SC-300)
- List of SC-1-class subchasers (SC-301 to SC-350)
- List of SC-1-class subchasers (SC-401 to SC-448)
