= List of SC-1-class subchasers (SC-151 to SC-200) =

The SC-1 class was a large class of submarine chasers built during World War I for the United States Navy. They were ordered in very large numbers in order to combat attacks by German U-boats, with 442 vessels built from 1917 to 1919. This article lists details of the fourth 50 ships of the class.

== Ships ==
Number	Builder	Commissioned	Fate	Notes
USS SC-151	Gibbs Gas Engine Company; Jacksonville, Florida	14 December 1917	Sold 24 June 1921.	Served on Otranto Barrage and took part in the Bombardment of Durazzo on 2 October 1918. Became party fishing boat after sale with the name Usona. Re-acquired by US Navy in 1942 as district patrol craft YP-191, resold in 1946, became fishing boat Sea Queen III.
USS SC-152	Gibbs Gas Engine Company; Jacksonville, Florida	17 January 1918	To US Coast Guard 22 November 1919 as USCGC Vaughan.	Decommissioned 28 March 1928.
USS SC-153	Gibbs Gas Engine Company; Jacksonville, Florida	14 February 1918	To US Coast Guard 22 November 1919 as USCGC Taylor.	Decommissioned 1 January 1923
USS SC-154	Gibbs Gas Engine Company; Jacksonville, Florida	15 February 1918	Sold 16 November 1921.	Operated from Key West during war.
USS SC-155	Gibbs Gas Engine Company; Jacksonville, Florida	11 April 1918	To US Coast Guard 22 November 1919 as USCGC Smith.	Served on US West coast (Alaska and California) for Coast Guard. Decommissioned 1937.
USS SC-156	F. M. Blount; Pensacola, Florida	30 October 1917	Sold 6 November 1924.	
USS SC-157	F. M. Blount; Pensacola, Florida	13 March 1918	Sold 24 June 1921.	
USS SC-158	F. M. Blount; Pensacola, Florida	13 March 1918	Sold 26 February 1921.	
USS SC-159	F. M. Blount; Pensacola, Florida	17 September 1917	Sold 16 November 1926.	Operated on aviation patrol duties based at Pensacola from 1921 to 1926.
USS SC-160	Howard E. Wheeler; Brooklyn, New York	22 December 1917	To France as C-25.	Later CH.25. Scuttled at Toulon 27 November 1942, later salvaged and scrapped.
USS SC-161	Howard E. Wheeler; Brooklyn, New York	30 March 1918	To France as C-36.	
USS SC-162	Howard E. Wheeler; Brooklyn, New York	10 May 1918	To France as C-44.	
USS SC-163	Howard E. Wheeler; Brooklyn, New York	18 May 1918	To France as C-48.	
USS SC-164	Howard E. Wheeler; Brooklyn, New York	23 March 1918	Sold 24 June 1921.	Served at Queenstown (now Cobh), Ireland and Plymouth, England during war.
USS SC-165	Howard E. Wheeler; Brooklyn, New York	23 March 1918	Destroyed in fire 25 August 1920	Served in Azores during war.
USS SC-166	Howard E. Wheeler; Brooklyn, New York	23 March 1918	Sold 24 June 1921.	Based at Newport, Rhode Island during war.
USS SC-167	Howard E. Wheeler; Brooklyn, New York	8 April 1918	Destroyed in fire 22 December 1917.	Based at Newport, Rhode Island during war.
USS SC-168	Howard E. Wheeler; Brooklyn, New York	8 April 1918	Sold 24 June 1921.	Fishing boat Whitby II after sale. Re-acquired by US Navy in 1942 as district patrol boat YP-178, but unsuitable and sold in June 1942. Fishing vessel Madonna from 1947. Abandoned and broken up 1959.
USS SC-169	Matthews Boat; Port Clinton, Ohio	30 March 1918	To France as C-37.	
USS SC-170	Matthews Boat; Port Clinton, Ohio	22 December 1917	To France as C-29	
USS SC-171	Matthews Boat; Port Clinton, Ohio	22 December 1917	To France as C-39.	
USS SC-172	Matthews Boat; Port Clinton, Ohio	22 December 1917	To France as C-26.	Named Jean Argaud in post war French service.
USS SC-173	Matthews Boat; Port Clinton, Ohio	30 March 1918	To France as C-31.	
USS SC-174	Matthews Boat; Port Clinton, Ohio	22 December 1917	To France as C-40.	
USS SC-175	Matthews Boat; Port Clinton, Ohio	30 March 1918	To France as C-32.	
USS SC-176	Matthews Boat; Port Clinton, Ohio	30 March 1918	To France as C-38.	
USS SC-177	Matthews Boat; Port Clinton, Ohio	31 October 1917	Exchanged hull number with USS SC-405.	The submarine chaser built as SC-405 was built for France but was damaged during Sea trials delaying delivery, so SC-177 and SC-405 exchanged hull numbers. The ship built as SC-177 became the French C-99. The new SC-177 (built as SC-405) was based at Plymouth, England during the war and was sold in 1921.
USS SC-178	Matthews Boat; Port Clinton, Ohio	Date unknown	Sold 24 June 1921.	Served at Plymouth, England and Queenstown, Ireland during war, and on minesweeping duties in North Sea after war.
USS SC-179	International Shipbuilding & Marine Engine Co. Upper Nyack, New York	24 December 1917	Sold to Italy 1920.	Based at Corfu during war and took part in the Bombardment of Durazzo on 2 October 1918.
USS SC-180	International Shipbuilding & Marine Engine Co. Upper Nyack, New York	27 April 1918	See Notes	Destroyed in accident 15 July 1920 according to Friedman; Destroyed by fire 29 October 1920 according to Subchaser Archives; Sold 24 June 1921 according to DANFS
USS SC-181	International Shipbuilding & Marine Engine Co. Upper Nyack, New York	27 April 1918	Sold 24 June 1921.	Served at Plymouth, England and Queenstown, Ireland during war, and on minesweeping duties in North Sea after war.
USS SC-182	International Shipbuilding & Marine Engine Co. Upper Nyack, New York	6 May 1918	Sold 24 June 1921.	Served in European waters in war.
USS SC-183	International Shipbuilding & Marine Engine Co. Upper Nyack, New York	27 April 1918	To US Coast Guard 21 October 1921 as USCGC Tinguard.	Decommissioned 3 June 1937
USS SC-184	International Shipbuilding & Marine Engine Co. Upper Nyack, New York	27 April 1918	Sunk in collision 9 August 1919.	Salvaged and sold for scrap 20 May 1921
USS SC-185	International Shipbuilding & Marine Engine Co. Upper Nyack, New York	27 April 1918	Lost 30 June 1940.	
USS SC-186	International Shipbuilding & Marine Engine Co. Upper Nyack, New York	27 April 1918	Sold 28 October 1926.	
USS SC-187	International Shipbuilding & Marine Engine Co. Upper Nyack, New York	April/May 1918	Sunk in collision 4 August 1918.	
USS SC-188	International Shipbuilding & Marine Engine Co. Upper Nyack, New York	13 March 1918	Scrapped 2 July 1924.	
USS SC-189	General Shipbuilding & Aero Corp. Alexandria, Virginia	13 March 1918	Sold 9 May 1921	
USS SC-190	General Shipbuilding & Aero Corp. Alexandria, Virginia	13 March 1918	Sold 10 November 1921	
USS SC-191	General Shipbuilding & Aero Corp. Alexandria, Virginia	13 March 1918	Sold 12 March 1924	
USS SC-192	General Shipbuilding & Aero Corp. Alexandria, Virginia	15 April 1918	Transferred to Sea Scouts 15 May 1937	
USS SC-193	General Shipbuilding & Aero Corp. Alexandria, Virginia	15 April 1918	Sold 24 June 1921.	
USS SC-194	General Shipbuilding & Aero Corp. Alexandria, Virginia	15 April 1918	Sold 24 June 1921.	Served on US East coast during war.
USS SC-195	General Shipbuilding & Aero Corp. Alexandria, Virginia	15 April 1918	Sold 12 November 1921.	
USS SC-196	General Shipbuilding & Aero Corp. Alexandria, Virginia	15 April 1918	Sold 24 June 1921.	
USS SC-197	General Shipbuilding & Aero Corp. Alexandria, Virginia	15 April 1918	To US Coast Guard as USCGC Mehalatos.	Sold 27 January 1923
USS SC-198	General Shipbuilding & Aero Corp. Alexandria, Virginia	15 April 1918	Sold 11 May 1921.	
USS SC-199	General Shipbuilding & Aero Corp. Alexandria, Virginia	14 April 1918	To US Coast Guard as USCGC Ovesen.	Sold 1923
USS SC-200	General Shipbuilding & Aero Corp. Alexandria, Virginia	17 April 1918	Sold 24 June 1921.	

== See also ==
- List of patrol vessels of the United States Navy
- List of SC-1-class subchasers (SC-1 to SC-50)
- List of SC-1-class subchasers (SC-51 to SC-100)
- List of SC-1-class subchasers (SC-101 to SC-150)
- List of SC-1-class subchasers (SC-201 to SC-250)
- List of SC-1-class subchasers (SC-251 to SC-300)
- List of SC-1-class subchasers (SC-301 to SC-350)
- List of SC-1-class subchasers (SC-351 to SC-400)
- List of SC-1-class subchasers (SC-401 to SC-448)
