= List of SC-1-class subchasers (SC-201 to SC-250) =

American submarine chaser

The SC-1 class was a large class of submarine chasers built during World War I for the United States Navy. They were ordered in very large numbers in order to combat attacks by German U-boats, with 442 vessels built from 1917 to 1919. This article lists details of the fifth group of 50 ships of the class.

== Ships ==
Number	Builder	Commissioned	Fate	Notes
USS SC-201	General Shipbuilding & Aero Corp. Alexandria, Virginia	23 April 1918	Sold 6 June 1922.	
USS SC-202	General Shipbuilding & Aero Corp. Alexandria, Virginia	23 April 1918	Sold 24 June 1921	
USS SC-203	General Shipbuilding & Aero Corp. Alexandria, Virginia	25 April 1918	To US Coast Guard 21 November 1919 as USCGC Larsen.	Decommissioned 1 January 1923, sold 11 January 1923.
USS SC-204	General Shipbuilding & Aero Corp. Alexandria, Virginia	25 April 1918	Sold 27 July 1922.	
USS SC-205	General Shipbuilding & Aero Corp. Alexandria, Virginia	25 April 1918	Sold 3 September 1920	
USS SC-206	General Shipbuilding & Aero Corp. Alexandria, Virginia	25 April 1918	Sold 1 June 1921.	Based at Plymouth, England and Queenstown, Ireland during World War I.
USS SC-207	General Shipbuilding & Aero Corp. Alexandria, Virginia	26 April 1918	Sold 21 April 1921.	Based at Plymouth, England during war and took part in post war minesweeping operations in North Sea.
USS SC-208	General Shipbuilding & Aero Corp. Alexandria, Virginia	15 May 1918	Sold 24 June 1921.	Based at Plymouth, England during war and took part in post war minesweeping operations in North Sea.
USS SC-209	Mathis Yacht Building Company; Camden, New Jersey	March 1918	Sunk 27 August 1918.	Sunk by gunfire by the cargo ship Felix Taussig, south of Long Island after Felix Taussig mistook her for an enemy submarine. Eighteen members of SC-209's crew died.
USS SC-210	Mathis Yacht Building Company; Camden, New Jersey	18 March 1918	Sold 23 April 1930.	Served at Gibraltar during war.
USS SC-211	Mathis Yacht Building Company; Camden, New Jersey	28 November 1918	Sold 24 June 1921.	Served in Azores during war.
USS SC-212	Mathis Yacht Building Company; Camden, New Jersey	15 March 1918	Sold 24 June 1921.	Served at Gibraltar during war.
USS SC-213	Mathis Yacht Building Company; Camden, New Jersey	18 March 1918	Sold 24 June 1921.	Served in Azores during war.
USS SC-214	Alex McDonald; Mariners Harbor, Staten Island	1 December 1917	Sold 21 February 1927.	Served at Gibraltar during war.
USS SC-215	Alex McDonald; Mariners Harbor, Staten Island	24 December 1917	Sold 28 June 1919	Based at Corfu during war.
USS SC-216	Alex McDonald; Mariners Harbor, Staten Island	14 February 1918	Sold 11 May 1921.	Based at Corfu during war.
USS SC-217	Alex McDonald; Mariners Harbor, Staten Island	19 February 1918	Sold 24 June 1921.	Based at Corfu during war.
USS SC-218	Newcomb Lifeboat Company; Hampton, Virginia	9 February 1918	Sold 21 July 1921.	
USS SC-219	Newcomb Lifeboat Company; Hampton, Virginia	19 February 1918	Destroyed in fire 9 October 1918.	
USS SC-220	Newcomb Lifeboat Company; Hampton, Virginia	13 March 1918	Sold 24 June 1921.	Based at Plymouth, England during war.
USS SC-221	Newcomb Lifeboat Company; Hampton, Virginia	13 March 1918	Sold 24 June 1921.	Based at Plymouth, England during war.
USS SC-222	Newcomb Lifeboat Company; Hampton, Virginia	13 March 1918	Sold 11 May 1921.	Based at Plymouth, England and Queenstown, Ireland during war.
USS SC-223	New York Yacht, Launch & Engine Company; Morris Heights, Bronx	5 December 1917	Sold 18 March 1936.	Served at Gibraltar during war. Used for survey duties around Cuba during 1920s.
USS SC-224	New York Yacht, Launch, & Engine Co. Morris Heights, Bronx	27 October 1917	Sold 8 September 1936.	Based at Brest, France and Plymouth, England during war.
USS SC-225	New York Yacht, Launch, & Engine Co. Morris Heights, Bronx	10 December 1917	Sold 11 May 1921	Based at Corfu and served on Otranto patrol.
USS SC-226	New York Yacht, Launch, & Engine Co. Morris Heights, Bronx	24 December 1917	Sold 20 July 1921.	Based at Bordeaux during war. Used as fishing boat with name By Gar.
USS SC-227	New York Yacht, Launch, & Engine Co. Morris Heights, Bronx	24 December 1917	Sold 14 October 1924.	Based at Corfu during war.
USS SC-228	New York Yacht, Launch, & Engine Co. Morris Heights, Bronx	23 January 1918	Sold 20 July 1921.	Served at Plymouth, England and Queenstown, Ireland during war, and on minesweeping duties in North Sea after war.
USS SC-229	New York Yacht, Launch, & Engine Co. Morris Heights, Bronx	23 January 1918	To US Coast Guard 14 August 1942 as USCGC Boone (WPC-335).	Decommissioned 6 June 1945. Disposed of 8 March 1946
USS SC-230	New York Yacht, Launch, & Engine Co. Morris Heights, Bronx	8 February 1918	Sold 24 June 1921.	
USS SC-231	New York Yacht, Launch, & Engine Co. Morris Heights, Bronx	8 February 1918	To US Coast Guard 14 August 1942 as USCGC Blaze (WPC-336).	Decommissioned 25 September 1944. Disposed of 8 March 1946
USS SC-232	New York Yacht, Launch, & Engine Co. Morris Heights, Bronx	8 February 1918	Sold 12 December 1923.	
USS SC-233	New York Yacht, Launch, & Engine Co. Morris Heights, Bronx	21 February 1918	To US War Department 2 September 1919	
USS SC-234	New York Yacht, Launch, & Engine Co. Morris Heights, Bronx	21 February 1918	To US War Department 2 September 1919	
USS SC-235	New York Yacht, Launch, & Engine Co. Morris Heights, Bronx	2 March 1918	Sold 24 June 1921.	
USS SC-236	New York Yacht, Launch, & Engine Co. Morris Heights, Bronx	2 March 1918	Sold 24 June 1921.	
USS SC-237	New York Yacht, Launch, & Engine Co. Morris Heights, Bronx	7 March 1918	Sold 18 May 1923.	
USS SC-238	New York Yacht, Launch, & Engine Co. Morris Heights, Bronx	12 March 1918	Sold 24 June 1921.	Re-acquired by War Shipping Administration 1943; To US Coast Guard as USCGC Bowstring (WPC-365) 7 July 1943. Decommissioned 23 December 1944. Disposed of 6 January 1946.
USS SC-239	New York Yacht, Launch, & Engine Co. Morris Heights, Bronx	19 March 1918	Sold 24 June 1921.	
USS SC-240	New York Yacht, Launch, & Engine Co. Morris Heights, Bronx	20 March 1918	Sold 11 May 1921	
USS SC-241	New York Yacht, Launch, & Engine Co. Morris Heights, Bronx	8 April 1918	Sold 11 May 1921	
USS SC-242	New York Yacht, Launch, & Engine Co. Morris Heights, Bronx	8 April 1918	Sold 11 May 1921	
USS SC-243	Eastern Shipyard Co. Greenport, New York	11 January 1917	To France as C-17	
USS SC-244	Eastern Shipyard Co. Greenport, New York	10 December 1917	Sold 11 May 1921.	Based at Corfu during war.
USS SC-245	Eastern Shipyard Co. Greenport, New York	7 March 1918	Sold 24 June 1921.	Served on East coast of US.
USS SC-246	Eastern Shipyard Co. Greenport, New York	7 March 1918	Sold 24 June 1921.	
USS SC-247	Eastern Shipyard Co. Greenport, New York	20 March 1918	Sold 11 May 1921.	
USS SC-248	Eastern Shipyard Co. Greenport, New York	17 January 1918	Sold 28 June 1919.	Based at Corfu during war.
USS SC-249	Chance Marine Construction Co. Annapolis, Maryland	18 May 1918	To France as C-47.	
USS SC-250	Chance Marine Construction Co. Annapolis, Maryland	17 May 1918	Sold 24 June 1921.	

== See also ==
- List of patrol vessels of the United States Navy
- List of SC-1-class subchasers (SC-1 to SC-50)
- List of SC-1-class subchasers (SC-51 to SC-100)
- List of SC-1-class subchasers (SC-101 to SC-150)
- List of SC-1-class subchasers (SC-151 to SC-200)
- List of SC-1-class subchasers (SC-251 to SC-300)
- List of SC-1-class subchasers (SC-301 to SC-350)
- List of SC-1-class subchasers (SC-351 to SC-400)
- List of SC-1-class subchasers (SC-401 to SC-448)
