= USS SC-131 =

WWI US submarine chaser

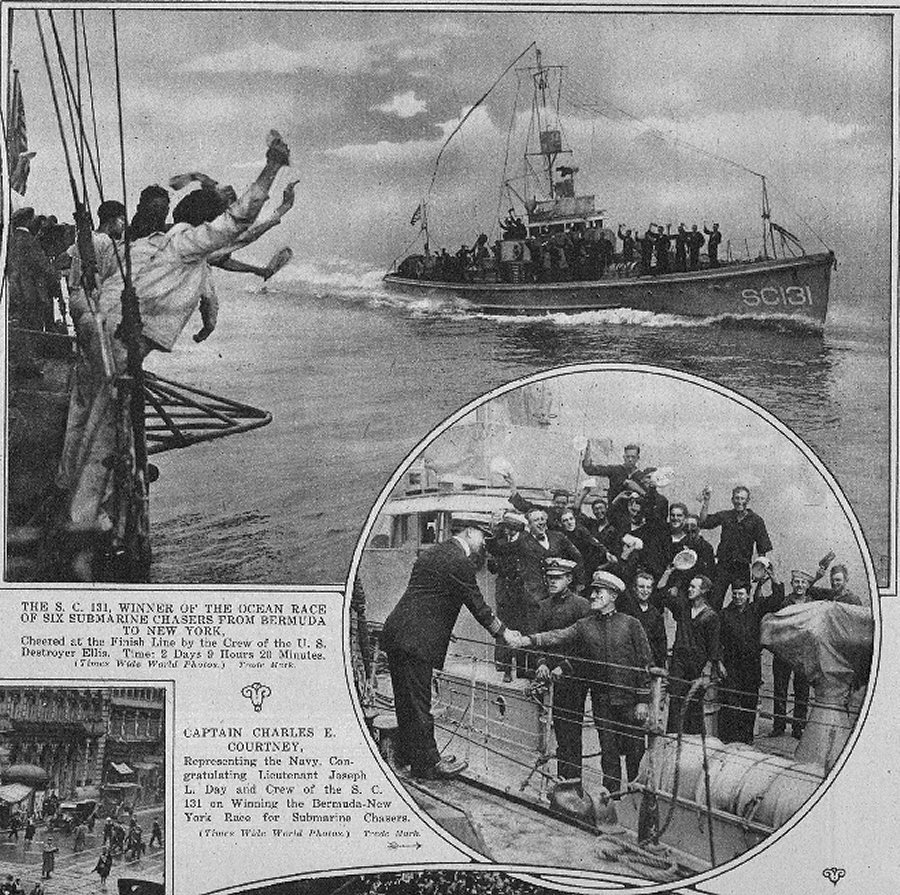
- Photo from the 24 August 1919 edition of the New York Times

History

France
- Name: SC-131
- Builder: Rocky River Dry Dock Co.; Rocky River, Ohio
- Launched: 1917
- Fate: Unknown

General characteristics
- Class & type: SC-1-class submarine chaser
- Displacement: 75 t
- Length: 110 ft (34 m)
- Beam: 13 ft 6 in (4.11 m)
- Draft: 6 ft 3 in (1.91 m)
- Propulsion: 3 × 660 hp (490 kW) Standard gasoline engines; 3 shafts
- Speed: 18 kn (33 km/h)
- Endurance: 1,000 nmi (1,900 km) at 12 kn (22 km/h)
- Complement: 26
- Armament: 1 × 3"/23 caliber gun mount; 3 × .30 caliber machine guns; 1 × Y gun depth charge projector

USS SC-131, sometimes styled as either Submarine Chaser No. 131 or S.C.-131, was an SC-1-class submarine chaser built for the United States Navy during World War I. Was the first U.S. Vessel to enter the Austro-German base at Cattaro after the signing of the armistice. On December 22, 1918, the ship left in a convoy from Corfu to Malta.

== Bermuda to New York race ==
Captained by Lieutenant commander Joseph L. Day won the Bermuda to New York race in 56 hours and 56 minutes beating the former record by 8 hours and 43 minutes. The race was between six submarine Chasers 90, 129, 131, 217, 224, 351. During the race one ship had mechanical difficulties when USS SC 129 broke a crankshaft and with only two engines was disqualified under the race rules.
