= SC-1-class submarine chaser =

Class of submarine chasers

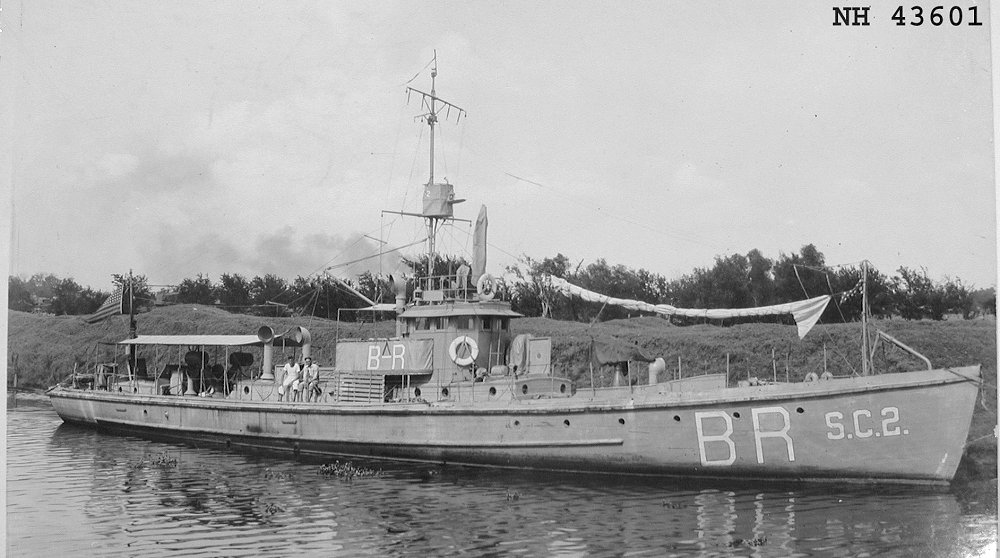
- SC-2

Class overview
- Operators: United States Navy; United States Coast Guard; United States Army; French Navy; Cuban Navy; Bulgarian Navy
- Built: 1917–1919
- Planned: 448
- Completed: 441
- Canceled: 7
- Lost: 9

General characteristics
- Type: Submarine chaser
- Displacement: 85 tons full load, 77 tons normal load
- Length: 110 ft (34 m) oa; 105 ft (32 m) pp
- Beam: 14 ft 9 in (4.50 m)
- Draft: 5 ft 7 in (1.70 m)
- Propulsion: Three 220 bhp (160 kW) gasoline engines, 2400 gallons fuel
- Speed: 18 kn (33 km/h)
- Range: 1,000 nmi (1,900 km) at 12 kn (22 km/h)
- Complement: 27
- Sensors & processing systems: One Submarine Signal Company S.C. C Tube, M.B. Tube, or K Tube hydrophone
- Armament: 1 × 3 in (76 mm)/23-caliber gun mount; 2 × Colt .30 caliber (7.62 mm) machine guns; 1 × Y-gun depth charge projector

The SC-1 class was a large class of submarine chasers built during World War I for the United States Navy. They were ordered in very large numbers in order to combat attacks by German U-boats, with 442 boats built from 1917 to 1919.

== Development ==
In 1916, the then Assistant Secretary of the Navy, Franklin D. Roosevelt ordered the US Navy to design a small anti-submarine vessel that could be built quickly in small civilian boatyards, as if war came, larger shipyards would be busy building larger warships. Consideration was given to adopting an 80 ft (24 m) wooden Motor Launch built in large numbers by ELCO for the British Royal Navy, but the General Board of the United States Navy thought that these boats were too small to be effective seaboats. The task of designing the new type was given to an experienced designer of small boats, Albert Loring Swasey. (Note: Swasey also designed the similar SC-497-class submarine chasers of World War II.) He drew up a design for a 100 ft (30 m) wooden boat, emphasizing seaworthiness over speed. At first it was intended to use two 300 brake horsepower (220 kW) engines, but a shortage of these engines resulted in the design being changed to use three 220 hp (160 kW) gasoline engines.

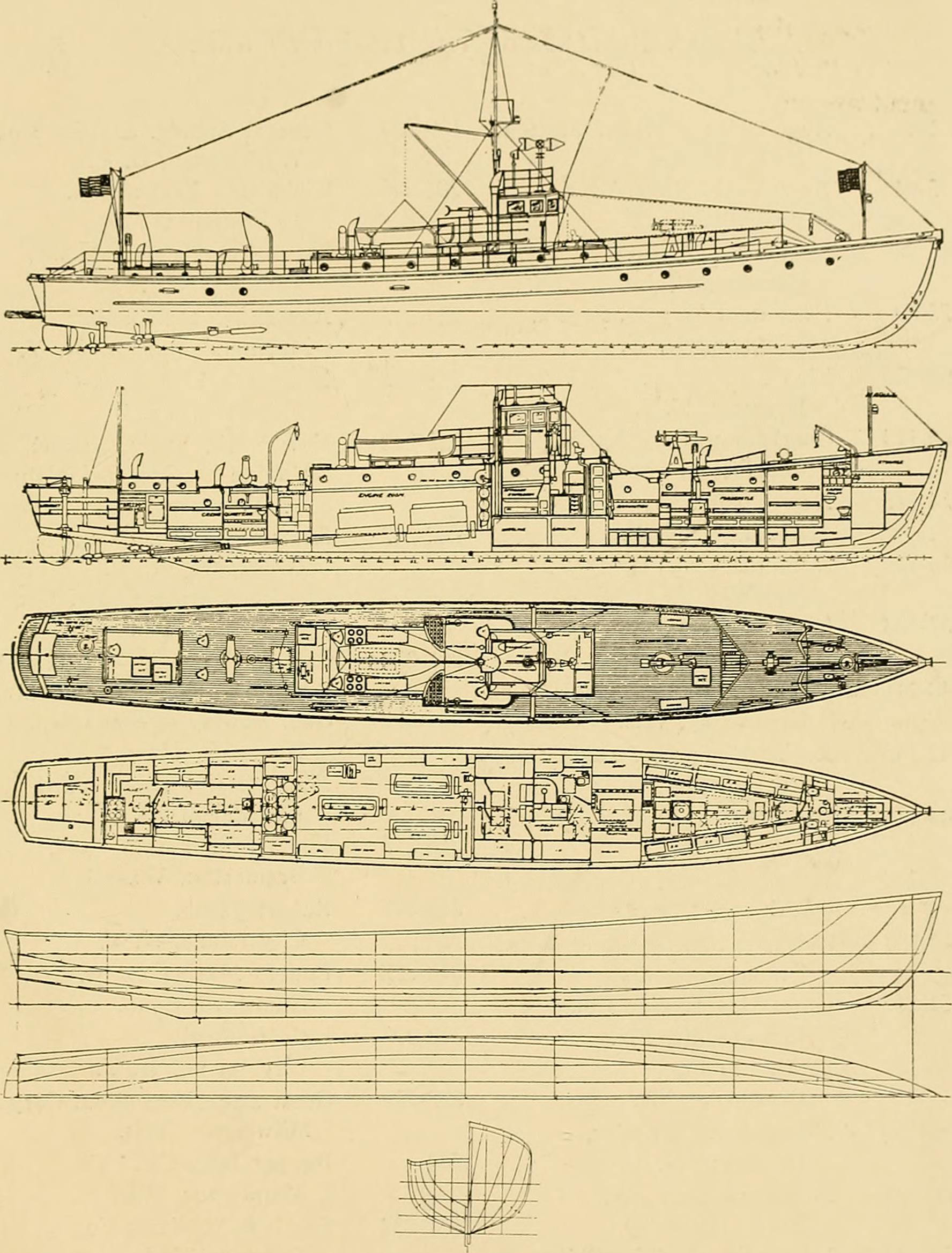
Diagram of SC-1-class submarine chaser

Armament was initially planned to be two 3-inch (76.2 mm) guns, but the aft gun was usually replaced by a depth charge thrower to attack submerged submarines, with two Colt machine guns completing the armament. Many boats were fitted with hydrophones for detecting underwater noises, with either a K-tube fish-type device of 30-nautical-mile (56 km; 35 mi) range or SC and MB tubes of 5-nautical-mile (9.3 km; 5.8 mi) range.

An initial order of 345 SC boats placed in 1917 was planned to be delivered by the end of 1917, with further orders for the French Navy pushing the total ordered up to 448.

== Operational history ==
Deliveries started in July 1917, with deliveries continuing into 1919, with 441 boats built, and the remaining seven boats canceled. One hundred were sold to France, and a further 121 US Navy SC boats were deployed to Europe to operate off Britain and France and in the Mediterranean, where they supported the Otranto Barrage with the remaining US Navy boats operating off the East Coast of the United States.

The US Navy lost six SC boats during World War I; USS SC-60 lost in collision with the tanker Fred M. Weller on 1 October 1918, USS SC-117 in a fire on 22 December 1917, USS SC-132 was lost in collision on 5 June 1918, USS SC-187 in a collision on 4 August 1918, USS SC-209 by friendly fire from the cargo ship SS Felix Taussig on 27 August 1918 and USS SC-219 by fire on 19 February 1918. France lost three SC-boats.

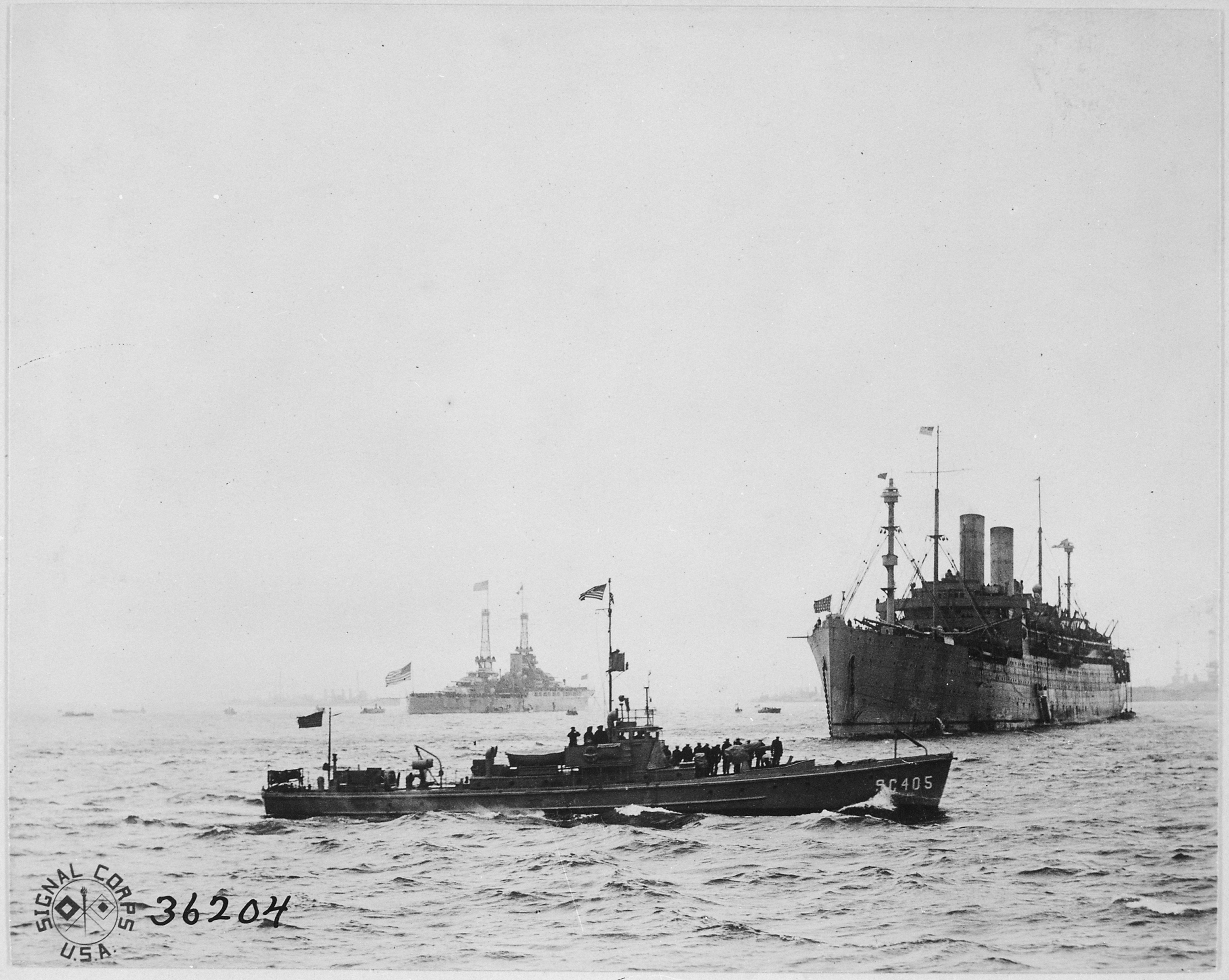
Submarine chaser SC-405 at Brest, France, December 1918

Following the end of the war, four boats (USS SC-274, USS SC-302, USS SC-311 and USS SC-312) were transferred to Cuba, while 14 boats were transferred to the United States Coast Guard in 1919–1920. Eight of the French SC boats remained in service at the outbreak of World War II.

In 1920 SC 292 sold commercial becoming Trawler "Chief Seattle", SC 293 becoming Trawler "George L. Harvey", and SC 300 becoming Trawler "Joseph Kildall'.

By December 1941, only 11 boats remained in US Navy service, with two continuing in use until at least April 1945.

Two boats were sold to the Bulgarian Navy and saw action in World War II, sinking one Soviet submarine.

== Ships ==
- List of SC-1-class subchasers (SC-1 to SC-50)
- List of SC-1-class subchasers (SC-51 to SC-100)
- List of SC-1-class subchasers (SC-101 to SC-150)
- List of SC-1-class subchasers (SC-151 to SC-200)
- List of SC-1-class subchasers (SC-201 to SC-250)
- List of SC-1-class subchasers (SC-251 to SC-300)
- List of SC-1-class subchasers (SC-301 to SC-350)
- List of SC-1-class subchasers (SC-351 to SC-400)
- List of SC-1-class subchasers (SC-401 to SC-448)

== See also ==
- List of patrol vessels of the United States Navy
- Wooden boats of World War II

== Bibliography ==
- Friedman, Norman. U.S. Small Combatants. Annapolis, Maryland, USA: Naval Institute Press, 1987. ISBN 0-87021-713-5.
- Gardiner, Robert and Randall Gray (eds). Conway's All The World's Fighting Ships 1906–1921. London: Conway Maritime Press, 1985. ISBN 0-85177-245-5.
- Gardiner, Robert; Chesneau, Roger, eds. (1980). Conway's All The World's Fighting Ships 1922–1946. London: Conway Maritime Press. ISBN 0-85177-146-7.
- Halpern, Paul G. A Naval History of World War I. London: UCL Press, 1995. ISBN 1-85728-498-4.
- Halpern, Paul G. The Naval War in the Mediterranean 1914–1918. Annapolis, Maryland, USA: Naval Institute Press, 1987. ISBN 0-87021-448-9.
- Moore, John. Jane's Fighting Ships of World War I. London: Studio, 1990. ISBN 1-85170-378-0.
