= Gammon =

Gammon may refer to:

== People ==
- Archer T. Gammon (1918–1945), United States Army soldier and Medal of Honor recipient
- James Gammon (1940–2010), American actor
- James Gammon (engraver) (fl. 1660–1670), English engraver
- Kendall Gammon (born 1968), American football player
- Reg Gammon (1894–1997), English painter
- Richard Gammon (born 1898), English World War I flying ace
- Richard Von Albade Gammon (1879–1897), American football player
- Roland Gammon (1915–1981), American writer
- Russell Gammon (1906–1968), Canadian rower
- Steve Gammon (born 1939), Welsh footballer
- Wayne Gammon (born 1950), Australian rower

== Other uses ==
- De Gammon, the language of Irish Travellers
- Gammon (tables games), a double win in Backgammon and other tables games
- Gammon, a word in Australian Aboriginal English with various meanings, mainly relating to lying or pretence
- Gammon (insult), a British pejorative insult term
- Gammon (meat), a cut of quick-cured pork leg
- Gammon, the rope lashing or iron hardware to attach a mast to a boat or ship
- Gammon bomb, a British hand grenade used during World War II
- Gammon Construction, a Hong Kong construction company
- Gammon India, an Indian civil engineering construction company
- Gammon Lake, in Ontario, Canada
- SA-5 Gammon, the NATO designation for the Russian Angara/Vega/Dubna surface-to-air missile system

== See also ==
- Gammons, a surname
