= Alex Pocklington =

British naval historian

- Years active: 2009–present

YouTube information
- Channel: Drachinifel
- Genre: History
- Subscribers: 595 thousand
- Views: 319 million
- Last updated: 27 August 2026
- Website: drachinifel.co.uk

Alex Pocklington is an naval historian from the United Kingdom best known for his YouTube channel Drachinifel.

== Career ==
=== Early career ===
Pocklington has a degree in engineering and began his career as an engineer for Croydon Council working in impact assessment working on the traffic control plans

=== Naval History career ===
Starting in the mid-2010s, Pocklington began his career in naval history, creating the YouTube channel Drachinifel and authoring a book on the HMS Belfast. His videos discuss ships, naval battles, and related subjects, especially focusing on the history of naval technical developments and the time period between 1850 and 1945. His work is supported through Patreon with sponsors able to suggest video topics.

In 2024, Pocklington hosted a panel discussion at the U.S. Naval Institute about the Battle of Leyte Gulf, later broadcast on C-SPAN. He later spoke about shipyards and shipbuilding during World War II at the SS Red Oak Victory, a Boulder Victory–class cargo ship and museum ship.

== Personal life ==
As of 2019, Pocklington lives in South London.
