= USNS Sgt. Morris E. Crain =

Cargo ship of the United States Navy

History

United States
- Name: Mills Victory; Sgt. Morris E. Crain
- Namesake: Mills College; Morris E. Crain awarded the Medal of Honor
- Ordered: as type (VC2-S-AP2) hull, MCV hull 741
- Builder: Permanente Metals Corporation, Richmond, California
- Laid down: 14 February 1945, as SS Mills Victory
- Launched: 28 March 1945
- Sponsored by: Miss Jane McVeigh
- Acquired: 21 April 1945
- Commissioned: 8 June 1946, as USAT Sgt. Morris E. Crain
- Decommissioned: 1 March 1950
- In service: 1 March 1950, as USNS Sgt. Morris E. Crain (T-AK-244)
- Out of service: 11 March 1975
- Stricken: 1 April 1975
- Identification: Hull symbol:T-AK-244
- Honours and awards: National Defense Service Medal
- Fate: Sold for scrapping, 17 July 1975, to General Metals of Tacoma, WA.

General characteristics
- Class & type: Boulder Victory-class cargo ship
- Displacement: 4,480 long tons (4,550 t) (standard); 15,580 long tons (15,830 t) (full load)
- Length: 455 ft (139 m)
- Beam: 62 ft (19 m)
- Draft: 29 ft 2 in (8.89 m)
- Installed power: 8,500 shp (6,300 kW)
- Propulsion: 1 × Westinghouse turbine; 2 × Babcock & Wilcox header-type boilers, 525psi 750°; double Westinghouse Main Reduction Gears; 1 × shaft
- Speed: 15.5 kn (17.8 mph; 28.7 km/h)
- Complement: 53 officers and enlisted
- Armament: none

USNS Sgt. Morris E. Crain (T-AK-244) was a Boulder Victory-class cargo ship built at the end of World War II and served in the war prior to its demilitarization as a commercial cargo vessel. From post-war to 1950 she served the U.S. Army as a transport named USAT Morris E. Crain. In 1950 she was acquired by the U.S. Navy and assigned to the Military Sea Transportation Service. In 1975 she ended her career and was placed into reserve.

== Victory ship built in California ==
Sgt. Morris E. Crain was laid down as Mills Victory under a U.S. Maritime Commission contract (MC hull V 741) on 14 February 1945 by Permanente Metals Corporation, Richmond, California; launched on 28 March 1945; sponsored by Miss Jane McVeigh; and delivered to the War Shipping Administration on 21 April 1945.

== U.S. Army service ==
Renamed the Sgt. Morris E. Crain by the U.S. Army, the ship served the Army Transportation Corps until 1950 when it was transferred to the U.S. Navy.

== Service with the MSTS ==
She was transferred to the Military Sea Transportation Service in February 1950 to become a United States Naval Ship. Home ported in San Francisco, California, Sgt. Morris E. Crain made trips to the major islands of the Pacific Ocean and carried military cargo to Korea in support of United Nations forces there.

As of 1974, Sgt. Morris E. Crain continued her service as a United States Naval Ship with a civil service crew. Assigned to the Military Sealift Command, Sgt. Morris E. Crain carried cargo for all the services.

== Decommissioning ==
She was decommissioned at an unknown date and struck from the Navy List on 1 April 1975. She was returned to the U.S. Maritime Commission on 17 July 1975. Her subsequent fate is not recorded.

== Honors and awards ==
- National Defense Service Medal
