= USS Boulder Victory =

Cargo ship of the United States Navy

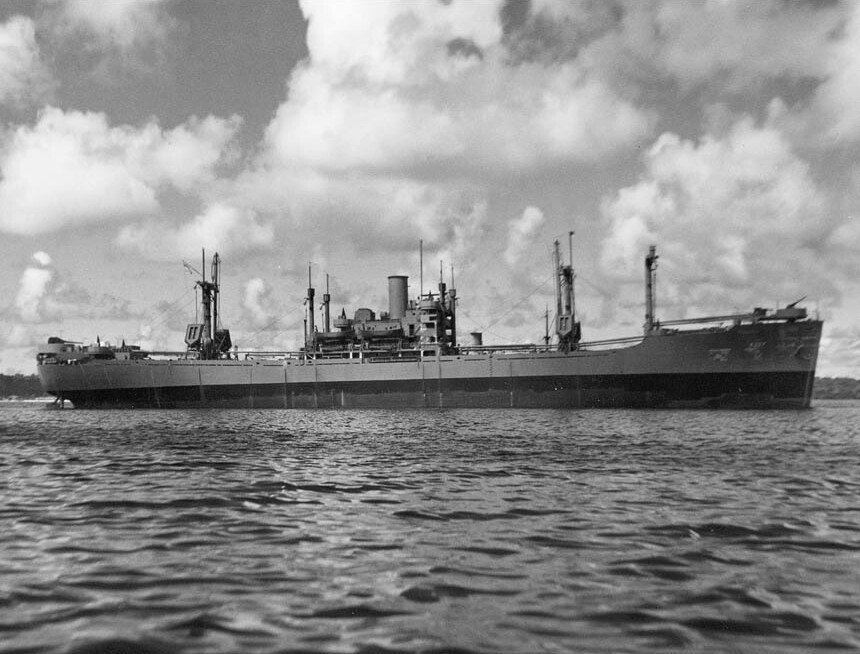
- USS Boulder Victory (AK-227) at Ulithi, 9 June 1945, after being drydocked there in USS ABSD-2 to repair mine damage.

History

United States
- Name: Boulder Victory
- Namesake: City of Boulder, Colorado
- Ordered: as a Type VC2-S-AP2 hull, MCV hull 536
- Builder: Permanente Metals Corporation, Richmond, California
- Yard number: 536
- Laid down: 18 June 1944
- Launched: 31 August 1944
- Sponsored by: Miss Elsa Maxwell
- Commissioned: 12 October 1944
- Decommissioned: 4 January 1946
- Stricken: 21 January 1946
- Identification: Hull symbol: AK-227; IMO number: 5049659; Code letters: NXUR
- Honors and awards: American Campaign Medal
- Fate: Scrapped 24 February 1984

General characteristics
- Class & type: Boulder Victory-class cargo ship
- Tonnage: 7,607 GRT
- Displacement: 4,480 long tons (4,550 t) (standard); 15,580 long tons (15,830 t) (full load)
- Length: 455 ft (139 m)
- Beam: 62 ft (19 m)
- Draft: 29 ft 2 in (8.89 m)
- Installed power: 2 × Babcock & Wilcox header-type boilers, 525psi 750°; 6,000 shp (4,500 kW)
- Propulsion: 1 × Westinghouse turbine; double Westinghouse Main Reduction Gears; 1 × shaft
- Speed: 15.5 kn (17.8 mph; 28.7 km/h)
- Capacity: 7,800 t (7,700 long tons) DWT; 453,210 cu ft (12,833 m^{3}) (non-refrigerated)
- Complement: 99 officers and enlisted
- Armament: 1 × 5 in (127 mm)/38-caliber dual-purpose gun; 1 × 3 in (76 mm)/50-caliber dual-purpose gun; 8 × 20 mm (0.8 in) Oerlikon cannons anti-aircraft (AA) mounts

USS Boulder Victory (AK-227) was a Boulder Victory-class cargo ship acquired by the US Navy during World War II. She was the lead ship of 20 ships in her class. She carried ammunition into the Pacific Ocean war zone and, on 20 December 1944 at Manus Island, New Guinea, she struck a naval mine and suffered a very large hole in her side.

Her ammunition did not explode due to the sudden inrush of seawater; however, her operations were somewhat limited after that event and post-war she returned to the United States for disposal by the Navy and a continued maritime career.

== Construction ==
Boulder Victory was laid down on 18 June 1944, at Richmond, California, by Permanente Metals Corporation, Yard No. 1, under a Maritime Commission (MARCOM) contract, MCV hull 536; launched on 31 August; sponsored by Miss Elsa Maxwell; transferred to the Navy on 12 October; and commissioned the same day.

== Service history ==
On 17 October, the newly commissioned cargo ship sailed to San Francisco, California, to begin duty as an ammunition supply vessel. Her holds were filled by 2 November, and Boulder Victory got underway for the western Pacific.

In order to support the Allied advances to the west and north, forward ammunition replenishment stations were established at Ulithi Atoll in the Western Caroline Islands and Kossol Passage in the Palau Islands. Boulder Victory received orders to transfer ammunition between these bases as needed. She made port at Eniwetok on 17 November to refuel, entered the lagoon at Ulithi on 30 November, and reached Kossol Passage on 8 December.

Kossol Passage ultimately proved to be unsuitable for ammunition handling owing to chronic heavy swells, the lack of storage facilities ashore, and the shortage of personnel to unload the supplies, as well as its proximity to Japanese-held Babelthuap Island. Floating mines from that island were a constant danger.

=== Striking a mine ===
On 20 December, as Boulder Victory set out for Manus, she struck one of those mines on her port side. The explosion tore a hole in her No. 3 hold that measured 18 by 32 ft (5.5 by 9.8 m). The hold contained 5-inch (127 mm) projectiles, but the fires started by the explosion were extinguished by the rapid rush of seawater into the space. As a consequence, only two shells exploded, leaving two 16-inch (406 mm) holes in the skin of the ship. Boulder Victory remained afloat, although low in the water; and, after emergency repairs to the engines, managed to get into Palau again on her own power. Her crew suffered no casualties, but the damage to the ship was so severe that her wartime operations ended.

The cargo ship remained anchored at Kossol Passage unloading ammunition and cleaning debris from the hold until 8 February 1945. She then slowly steamed to Manus to unload the remainder of her cargo and to enter a floating dry dock for further repairs. Finally, on 13 June, Boulder Victory's temporary repairs made her seaworthy again, and she set course via Pearl Harbor for San Francisco. On 30 June, the ship began a major overhaul by United Engineering Company at Alameda, California, to complete the repairs.

=== End-of-war operations ===
Boulder Victory was still in overhaul when the Japanese capitulated in August; but, on 1 September, the cargo ship began shakedown and training exercises off San Diego, California. She got underway on 10 October, to carry supplies to the occupation troops in Japan. After a refueling stop at Eniwetok, Boulder Victory continued on to Okinawa where she arrived on 30 October.

She unloaded her cargo and embarked returning veterans. On 10 November, she set sail for the United States.

== Post-war decommissioning ==
After discharging her passengers, the ship sailed for San Francisco, where she commenced demilitarization on 5 December and was returned to the War Shipping Administration (WSA) on 4 January 1946. Her name was struck from the Navy list on 21 January 1946.

== War Relief and Seacowboys ==
In 1946 after World War II the Boulder Victory was converted to a livestock ship, also called a cowboy ship. From 1945 to 1947 the United Nations Relief and Rehabilitation Administration and the Brethren Service Committee of the Church of the Brethren sent livestock to war-torn countries. These "seagoing cowboys" made about 360 trips on 73 different ships. The Heifers for Relief project was started by the Church of the Brethren in 1942; in 1953 this became Heifer International. The SS Boulder Victory was one of these ships, known as cowboy ships, as she moved livestock across the Atlantic Ocean. Boulder Victory made six trips moved horses, heifers, and mules as well as some chicks, rabbits, and goats. In 1947 with her war and relief work done she was laid up in the Wilmington Group and later transferred to Suisun Bay as part of the National Defense Reserve Fleet.

== Merchant service ==
During 1946 and 1947, Boulder Victory was operated by Parry Navigation Company She was then inactivated and laid up at Wilmington, North Carolina, until 1951, when she began operations for the Isbrantsen Company, Inc., and then for the American-Hawaiian Steamship Company. On 29 October 1953, she was transferred to the National Defense Reserve Fleet, at Suisun Bay, California.

On 20 May 1957, American President Lines (APL) removed Boulder Victory so that the University of California could conduct thermal stress tests on her. She was returned 3 September 1957.

She was removed 1 December 1983, for scrapping by C.J.W. Shipping & Trading Company. She was scrapped in Kaohsiung, Taiwan, between 1983 and 1984.

== Awards ==
Qualified Boulder Victory personnel were eligible for the following:

- American Campaign Medal
- Asiatic-Pacific Campaign Medal
- World War II Victory Medal

== Notes ==
Citations

== Bibliography ==
Online resources

- Walker, Mary P. (20 December 2005). "Boulder Victory". Dictionary of American Naval Fighting Ships. Naval History and Heritage Command. This article incorporates text from this source, which is in the public domain.
- "Kaiser Permanente No. 1, Richmond CA". ShipbuildingHistory.com. 13 October 2010.
- "USS Boulder Victory (AK-227)". NavSource. 8 November 2013.
- "BOULDER VICTORY". United States Department of Transportation. Archived from the original on 3 November 2016.
