= USS Bucyrus Victory =

Cargo ship of the United States Navy

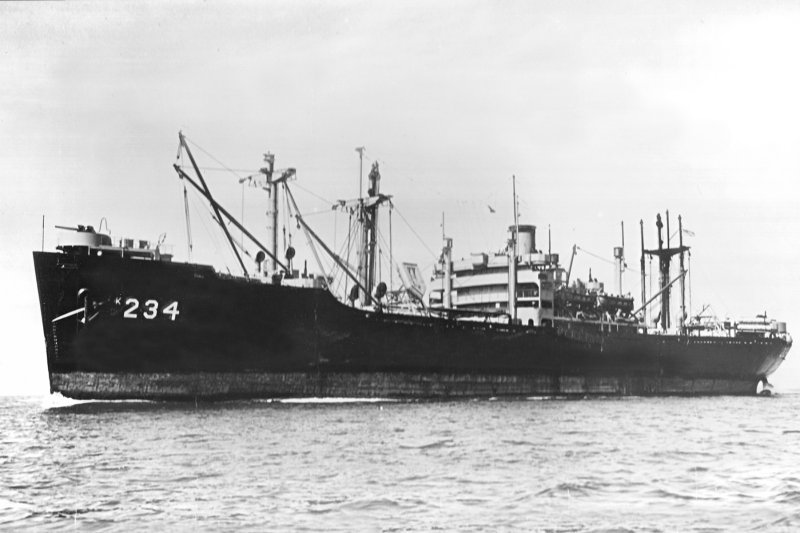
- USS Bucyrus Victory (AK-234) probably photographed when she returned to San Francisco from the Western Pacific in December 1945.

History

United States
- Name: Bucyrus Victory
- Namesake: City of Bucyrus, Ohio
- Ordered: as type (VC2-S-AP2) hull, MCV hull 543
- Builder: Permanente Metals Corporation, Richmond, California
- Yard number: 543
- Laid down: 1 September 1944
- Launched: 31 October 1944
- Sponsored by: Miss Eleanor Fogley
- Acquired: 29 November 1944
- Commissioned: 29 November 1944
- Decommissioned: 24 April 1946
- Stricken: 8 May 1946
- Identification: Hull symbol: AK-234; IMO number: 5054630; Call sign: KYVK
- Honors and awards: one battle star during World War II
- Fate: Scrapped in October 1969

General characteristics
- Class & type: Boulder Victory-class cargo ship
- Displacement: 4,480 long tons (4,550 t) (standard); 15,580 long tons (15,830 t) (full load)
- Length: 455 ft (139 m)
- Beam: 62 ft (19 m)
- Draft: 29 ft 2 in (8.89 m)
- Installed power: 6,000 shp (4,500 kW)
- Propulsion: 1 × Westinghouse turbine; 2 × Foster Wheeler header-type boilers, 525psi 750°; double Westinghouse Main Reduction Gears; 1 × shaft
- Speed: 15.5 kn (17.8 mph; 28.7 km/h)
- Complement: 99 officers and enlisted
- Armament: 1 × 5 in (130 mm)/38-caliber dual-purpose gun; 1 × 3 in (76 mm)/50-caliber dual-purpose gun; 8 × 20 mm (0.79 in) Oerlikon cannons anti-aircraft gun mounts

USS Bucyrus Victory (AK-234) was a Boulder Victory-class cargo ship acquired by the U.S. Navy during World War II. She served in the Pacific Ocean theatre of operations through the end of the war, earning one battle star, and then returned to the United States for disposal.

== Victory built in California ==
Bucyrus Victory (AK-234) was laid down on 1 September 1944 at Richmond, California, by the Permanente Metals Corporation under a U.S. Maritime Commission contract (MCV hull 543); launched on 31 October 1944; sponsored by Miss Eleanor Fogley; acquired by the Navy on a loan basis on 29 November 1944; and commissioned that same day.

== World War II operations ==
The urgent need for ammunition carriers to resupply the fleet prosecuting the final stages of the war against Japan in the Pacific Ocean prompted the Navy's acquisition of Bucyrus Victory and several of her sisters. That exigency also precluded conversion work and limited her fitting out and shakedown periods to the absolute minimum.

She completed shakedown training during the third week in December, loaded cargo at Port Hueneme, California, and headed for Hawaii. The cargo ship arrived in Pearl Harbor on 3 January 1945. While at Pearl Harbor, Bucyrus Victory put to sea on the 9th in company with USS Texas (BB-35) to test the feasibility of transferring ammunition to large warships while at sea. Soon after the successful conclusion of that experiment, the cargo carrier headed back to the U.S. West Coast, arriving in San Francisco, California, on 20 January.

After about a month, she moved to Port Chicago, California, to load ammunition bound for the western Pacific. Bucyrus Victory departed Port Chicago on 18 February. Steaming independently by way of Eniwetok Atoll in the Marshall Islands, she arrived in the lagoon at Ulithi Atoll in the Eastern Caroline Islands on 8 March. There, she reported for duty to the commander, Service Squadron (ServRon) 10.

=== Supporting the Okinawa campaign ===
The ship remained at Ulithi for just over two weeks, first discharging her original cargo to fleet units preparing for the assault on Okinawa and then reloading for her resupply role in the impending campaign. In company with several other ships, Bucyrus Victory put to sea on 24 March to join Task Group (TG) 50.8, the replenishment group operating at sea in support of the U.S. 5th Fleet. She steamed in company with that task organization until ordered to Kerama Retto on 1 April. The ship entered the anchorage two days later and spent the next week distributing ammunition to various units of the fleet.

Though enemy air attacks interrupted her work and sometimes stopped it altogether, Bucyrus Victory suffered no damage and took little or no part in the anti-air defense of the anchorage. She returned to sea on 11 April and rejoined Task Group 50.8 briefly before parting company with the replenishment group in accordance with orders directing her to Ulithi. There, the ship took on Okinawa-bound supplies—primarily ammunition for units of the U.S. 5th Fleet—before leaving Ulithi at the end of April.

=== Danger from air attack ===
She pulled into Kerama Retto again on 3 May and resumed the work of distributing ammunition among the assembled ships. Bucyrus Victory's second tour of duty at Kerama Retto lasted a fortnight; and, once again, Japanese aviators contributed all they could in the way of complications to her efforts. Those nuisances, however, did not prevent Bucyrus Victory from accomplishing her mission.

On 17 May, she emerged unscathed from the anchorage and rejoined Task Group 50.8 in the holding area 24 hours steaming time to the east of Okinawa. A few days thereafter, the ersatz ammunition ship headed back to Ulithi. She remained at Ulithi until 4 June at which time she got underway for the Philippine Islands. From mid-June to late September, Bucyrus Victory lay at anchor in San Pedro Bay off Leyte receiving and storing ammunition.

=== Supporting occupation forces ===
After the Japanese capitulation, her mission changed to one of providing support for the occupation forces in the Far East. She departed Leyte on 26 September and arrived in Buckner Bay, Okinawa, on 4 October. The ship provided support for the occupation forces for about five weeks.

== Post-war decommissioning and career ==
On 16 November, she headed back to the United States for inactivation and arrived back on the U.S. West Coast early in December. Following inactivation overhaul, Bucyrus Victory was placed out of commission at San Francisco on 24 April 1946. That same day, she was transferred to the U.S. Maritime Commission's War Shipping Administration for disposal. Her name was struck from the Navy list on 8 May 1946. Merchant service: Prudential Steamship Corporation, 1946; Isthmian Steamship Company in 1947; Mississippi Shipping Company in 1948–1950; Pacific Far East Line in 1951; Waterman Steamship Corporation in 1953; J.J. Tennant Company in 1966; W.R. Chamberlyn & Company in 1968 and American President Lines in 1968. In August 1969 she was placed in the Pacific Reserve Fleet, Long Beach and sold for scrapping the same year.

== Honors and awards ==
Bucyrus Victory earned one battle star during World War II:

- Okinawa Gunto operation - Assault and occupation of Okinawa Gunto, 3 to 11 April and 3 to 17 May 1945

Qualified Bucyrus Victory personnel were eligible for the following:

- American Campaign Medal
- Asiatic-Pacific Campaign Medal (1)
- World War II Victory Medal
- Navy Occupation Service Medal (with Asia clasp)
- Philippines Liberation Medal
