= USS Newcastle Victory =

Cargo ship of the United States Navy

History

United States
- Name: Newcastle Victory
- Ordered: as type (VC2-S-AP2) hull, MCV hull 542
- Builder: Permanente Metals Corporation, Richmond, California
- Yard number: Yard No.1
- Laid down: 21 August 1944
- Launched: 17 October 1944
- Commissioned: 23 November 1944
- Decommissioned: 21 June 1946
- Stricken: 3 July 1946
- Identification: Hull symbol: AK-233; IMO number: 5250363
- Fate: donated to the US Merchant Marine Academy as a fund raiser, sold via broker in New York for scrapping at Alang, India, 17 January 1992

General characteristics
- Class & type: Boulder Victory-class cargo ship
- Displacement: 4,480 long tons (4,550 t) (standard); 15,580 long tons (15,830 t) (full load)
- Length: 455 ft (139 m)
- Beam: 62 ft (19 m)
- Draft: 29 ft 2 in (8.89 m)
- Installed power: 6,000 shp (4,500 kW)
- Propulsion: 1 × Westinghouse turbine; 2 × Foster Wheeler header-type boilers, 525psi 750°; double Westinghouse Main Reduction Gears; 1 × shaft
- Speed: 15.5 kn (17.8 mph; 28.7 km/h)
- Complement: 99 officers and enlisted
- Armament: 1 × 5 in (130 mm)/38-caliber dual-purpose gun; 1 × 3 in (76 mm)/50-caliber dual-purpose gun; 8 × 20 mm (0.79 in) Oerlikon cannons anti-aircraft gun mounts

USS Newcastle Victory (AK-233) was a Boulder Victory-class cargo ship acquired by the U.S. Navy during World War II. She served in the Pacific Ocean theatre of operations through the end of the war, and then returned to the United States of America for disposal.

== Victory built in California ==
Newcastle Victory, built by Permanente Metals Corporation, Richmond, California, was laid down 21 August 1944; launched 17 October; and named 29 October. One of many Victory ships ordered by the U.S. Maritime Commission, she was one of ten taken over by the Navy to carry ammunition; and commissioned 23 November.

== World War II operations ==
After shakedown off the California coast, she put in at San Francisco, California, 12 December and took on a cargo of ammunition. Upon completion of loading at Port Chicago, California, and at San Pablo, California, she steamed for Pearl Harbor 28 December.

Newcastle Victory departed Pearl Harbor 17 January 1945, arrived Guam 1 February, departed 6 February in a small convoy bound for Ulithi, where she anchored 8–17 February. She then returned to Guam and offloaded ammunition for the newly commissioned ammunition depot there.

She departed 7 March for San Francisco via Eniwetok and Pearl Harbor. At Pearl Harbor she received a three-week availability, which brought new ordnance and radar equipment and habitability improvements. She departed Pearl Harbor 17 April, arrived San Francisco 23 April, and then took on a new cargo of ammunition at Port Chicago, California.

She steamed towards Leyte 15 May, via Pearl Harbor, Saipan, and Ulithi. During June she serviced ships in San Pedro Bay, Leyte, in the Philippine Islands; during July she returned to Ulithi and there assumed duties as station issues ship.

Newcastle Victory was directed to proceed to Seattle, Washington, in November 1945, where she was laid up in a reduced manning status until May 1946, when she was directed to report to the 3d Naval District for disposal. She steamed in early May via the Panama Canal and Vieques Island, Puerto Rico, where she offloaded her ammunition.

== Post-war decommissioning and career ==
She reported to commander, 3d Naval District, New York, 30 May and decommissioned 21 June. She was stricken from the Navy List 3 July 1946. Returned to the U.S. Maritime Commission. She became a World War II United States Merchant Navy ship and was operated by the Union Sulphur Company from 21 June 1946 to 1 October 1946. On 1 October 1946 Newcastle Victory was transferred to the Pacific-Atlantic Steamship Company. Pacific-Atlantic Steamship Company returned the Newcastle Victory on 29 October 1946 and she was placed in the Pacific Reserve Fleet, Astoria Group. She was removed from the Reserve fleet on 7 August 1950 and returned to the Pacific-Atlantic Steamship Company for operations to support the Korean War, under a general agency agreement. Post war, on 21 September 1953, she was placed in the James River, Reserve Fleet. On 8 December 1956, she was removed from the Reserve fleet and restored to service with the United States Lines as a Military Sea Transportation Service, ship to support the Vietnam War. On 19 January 1970 she was returned to the James River, Reserve Fleet. She was scrapped at Alang, India on 17 January 1992.
