= USNS Sgt. Truman Kimbro =

Cargo ship of the United States Navy

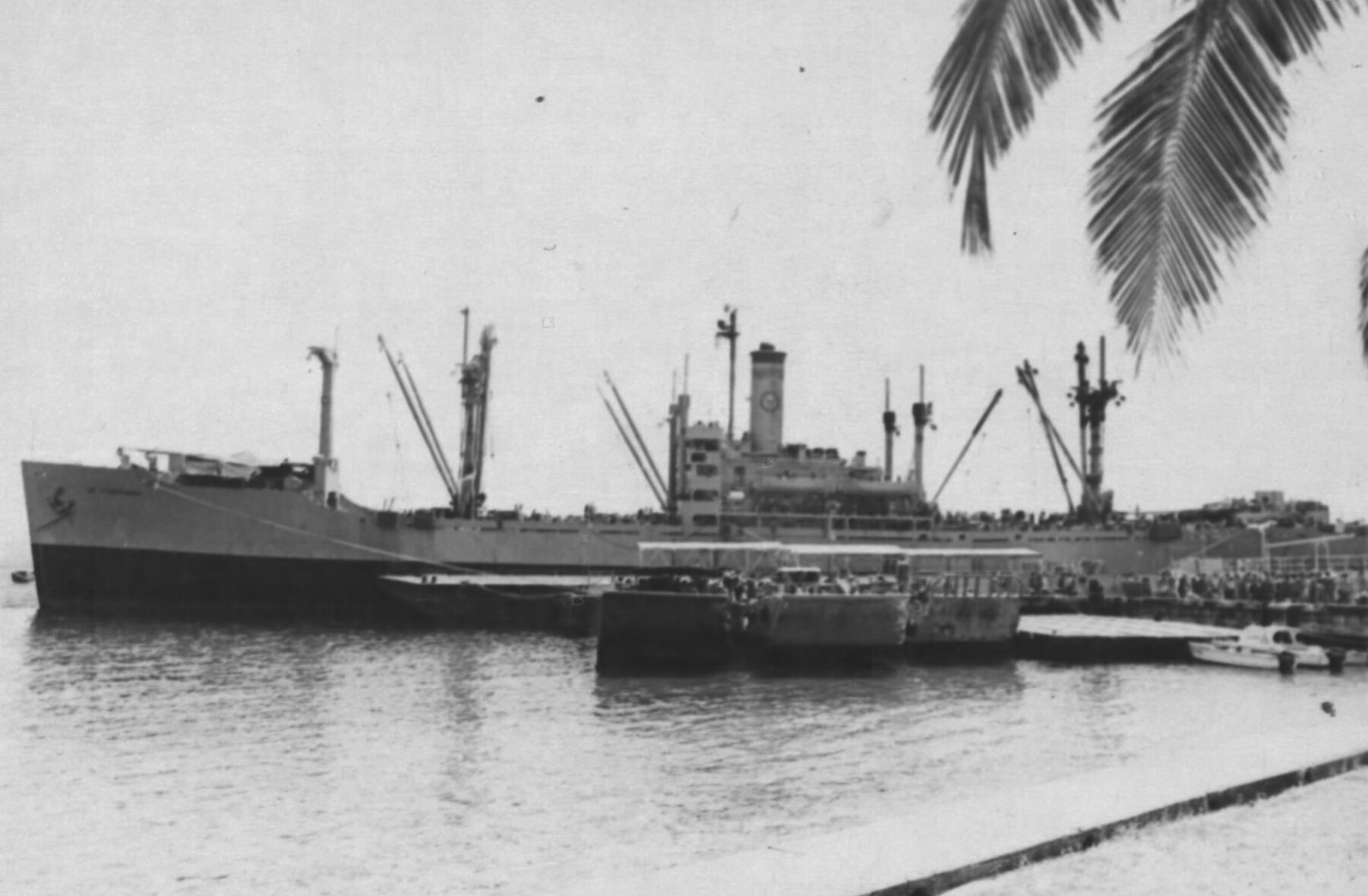
- USNS Sgt. Truman Kimbro at Subic Bay, May 1975

History

United States
- Name: Hastings Victory; Sgt. Truman Kimbro
- Namesake: Hastings College; Truman Kimbro, awarded the Medal of Honor
- Ordered: as type (VC2-S-AP2) hull, MCV hull 547
- Builder: Permanente Metals Corporation, Richmond, California
- Laid down: 30 September 1944, as SS Hastings Victory
- Launched: 30 November 1944
- Sponsored by: Mrs. John A. Mc Keown
- Commissioned: 31 October 1947 as USAT Sgt. Truman Kimbro
- Decommissioned: 19 January 1950
- Acquired: 5 August 1950
- In service: September 1950 as USNS Sgt. Truman Kimbro (T-AK-254)
- Out of service: date unknown
- Stricken: 15 June 1973
- Identification: Hull symbol:T-AK-254
- Honors and awards: two battle stars for Korean War service
- Fate: Sold for scrapping, 1 October 1982, to C.W. Enterprise and Investment Co.

General characteristics
- Class & type: Boulder Victory-class cargo ship
- Displacement: 4,480 long tons (4,550 t) (standard); 15,580 long tons (15,830 t) (full load)
- Length: 455 ft (139 m)
- Beam: 62 ft (19 m)
- Draft: 29 ft 2 in (8.89 m)
- Installed power: 8,500 shp (6,300 kW)
- Propulsion: 1 × Steam turbine; 1 × shaft
- Speed: 17 kn (20 mph; 31 km/h)
- Complement: 53 officers and enlisted
- Armament: 4 x 40 mm (1.6 in) anti-aircraft guns, single anti-aircraft guns (4x1)

USNS Sgt. Truman Kimbro (T-AK-254) was a Boulder Victory-class cargo ship built for the U.S. Maritime Commission during the final months of World War II as the SS Hastings Victory.

She was acquired by the U.S. Army in 1946 and renamed USAT Sgt. Truman Kimbro and served the Army until 1950 when she was acquired by the United States Navy. She served the Navy worldwide until 1973 when she was struck and sold.

== Victory built in California ==
Sgt. Truman Kimbro (AK-254) was laid down under Maritime Commission contract (MCV hull 547) as Hastings Victory on 30 September 1944 by the Permanente Metals Corporation, Richmond, California; launched on 30 November 1944; sponsored by Mrs. John A. Mc Keown; and delivered to the War Shipping Administration on 22 December 1944 for operation by the Grace Line.

== World War II ==
The SS Hastings Victory was operated by the Grace Line during World War II and into the spring of 1946. She served in the Pacific War, participating in the Battle of Okinawa from 24 June 1945 to 30 June 1945. During that time she used her deck guns to defend herself and other ship. For her war action her crew earned a World War II Battle Star.

== U.S. Army service ==
After the war she was returned to the Maritime Commission and, on 18 June 1946, was transferred to the U.S. Army. Renamed Sgt. Truman Kimbro on 31 October 1947, she was operated by the Army Transportation Service through the 1940s and, on 19 January 1950, was laid up in the National Defense Reserve Fleet at Olympia, Washington.

== U.S. Navy service ==
=== Korean War service ===
By July 1950 war had broken out in Korea, and she was ordered reactivated for transfer to the US Navy. On 5 August, she was assigned to the Navy's Military Sea Transportation Service (MSTS); and, manned by a civil service crew, she was placed in service in September as USNS Sgt. Truman Kimbro (T-AK-254).

Throughout the Korean War, the ship was primarily employed in moving vital cargo across the Pacific Ocean to United Nations forces fighting on that embattled peninsula. She also made shorter runs to Alaskan ports and to central Pacific bases.

=== Post-war service ===
After the war, her itinerary was extended to include most large Far Eastern ports. In the spring of 1958, she was shifted temporarily to Greenland, transatlantic, and Mediterranean runs.

She completed her last voyage to the Mediterranean in October; transited the Suez Canal in November; and resumed cargo operations in the Pacific in December.

== Post-war decommissioning and career ==
Sgt. Truman Kimbro was placed out of service at an unknown date and struck from the Navy List on 15 June 1973. Since then, into 1975, it continued to carry cargo for MSTS, now called the Military Sealift Command (MSC). In late April 1975 the ship was part of a flotilla of MSC ships that carried out seaborne evacuations of South Vietnamese from Saigon Port during the Fall of Saigon.

She was placed into reserve at the National Defense Reserve Fleet, Suisun Bay, Benicia, California until sold for scrapping on 1 October 1982.

== Honors and awards ==
The Sgt. Truman Kimbro earned two battle stars during the Korean War:

Communist China Aggression - 25 to 30 December 1950
First UN Counter Offensive - 8 to 10 March 1951

Qualified vessel personnel were authorized the following:

National Defense Service Medal
Korean Service Medal (2)
United Nations Service Medal
Republic of Korea War Service Medal (retroactive)
