= USS Mayfield Victory =

Cargo ship of the United States Navy

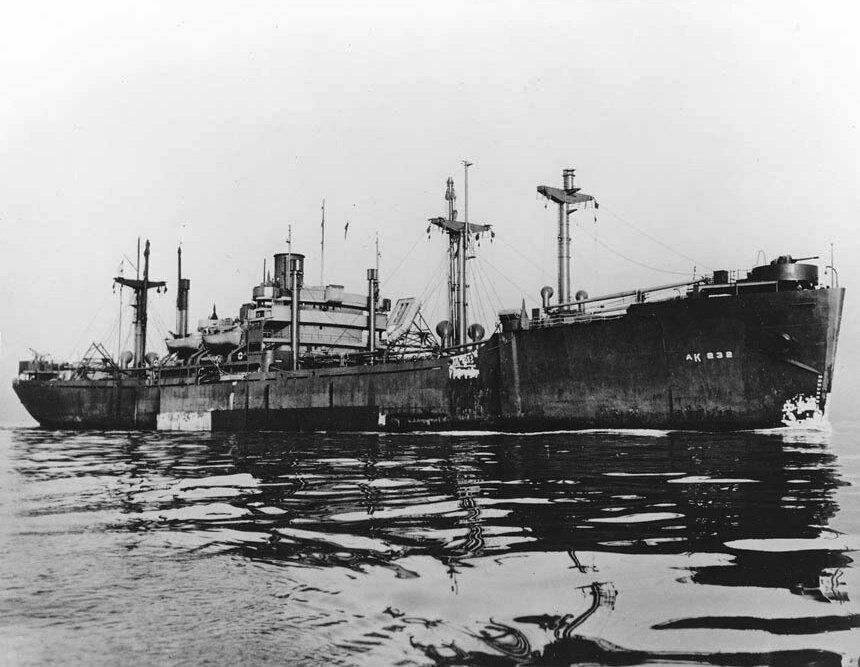
- USS Mayfield Victory (AK-232)

History

United States
- Name: Mayfield Victory
- Namesake: City of Mayfield, Kentucky
- Ordered: as type (VC2-S-AP2) hull, MCV hull 541
- Builder: Permanente Metals Corporation, Richmond, California
- Yard number: 541
- Laid down: 10 August 1944
- Launched: 10 October 1944
- Sponsored by: Miss Evelyn Fuller
- Acquired: 19 November 1944
- Commissioned: 19 November 1944
- Decommissioned: 5 April 1946
- Stricken: 17 April 1946
- Identification: Hull symbol: AK-232; IMO number: 5230222
- Fate: Sold for scrapping, 31 March 1993 to Ever-Glitter Int'l., Ltd. New York, N.Y.

General characteristics
- Class & type: Boulder Victory-class cargo ship
- Displacement: 4,480 long tons (4,550 t) (standard); 15,580 long tons (15,830 t) (full load)
- Length: 455 ft (139 m)
- Beam: 62 ft (19 m)
- Draft: 29 ft 2 in (8.89 m)
- Installed power: 6,000 shp (4,500 kW)
- Propulsion: 1 × Westinghouse turbine; 2 × Foster Wheeler header-type boilers, 525psi 750°; double Westinghouse Main Reduction Gears; 1 × shaft
- Speed: 15.5 kn (17.8 mph; 28.7 km/h)
- Complement: 99 officers and enlisted
- Armament: 1 × 5 in (130 mm)/38-caliber dual-purpose gun; 1 × 3 in (76 mm)/50-caliber dual-purpose gun; 8 × 20 mm (0.79 in) Oerlikon cannons anti-aircraft gun mounts

USS Mayfield Victory (AK-232) was a Boulder Victory-class cargo ship acquired by the U.S. Navy during World War II. She served in the Pacific Ocean theatre of operations through the end of the war and then returned to the United States for disposal.

== Victory built in California ==
Mayfield Victory (AK 232) was laid down under U.S. Maritime Commission contract 10 August 1944 by Permanente Metals Corporation, Yard 1, Richmond, California; launched 10 October 1944; sponsored by Miss Evelyn Fuller; acquired by the Navy from the Maritime Commission under loan charter 19 November 1944; and commissioned the same day.

== World War II operations ==
Following shakedown off San Pedro, California, into December, Mayfield Victory loaded ammunition at Aberdeen, Washington, and at Puget Sound, Washington, before sailing for the South Pacific Ocean the 24th. She arrived Pearl Harbor 1 January 1945 to unload her cargo and 15 days later returned to the U.S. West Coast, arriving San Francisco, California, 22 January.

Mayfield Victory departed San Francisco 11 February for the Caroline Islands, via Eniwetok, the Marshall Islands, arriving Ulithi 3 March. She remained there until 13 April when she continued on to the Ryukyu Islands for the Okinawa campaign 1 April to 21 June, the second American objective in the "hop, skip, and jump" to the Empire of Japan warned against by Japanese Admiral Ito. The cargo ship spent 4 weeks in the area, operating with Task Group 50.8 until 23 April when she anchored in Kerama Retto. During the latter period Mayfield Victory continually issued ammunition, often under direct enemy air attack.

On 14 May Mayfield Victory steamed for Ulithi, arriving the 21st. Four days later she continued on to the Philippine Islands for a 30-day stopover at Leyte. The ship then returned to Kerama Retto 1 July. On 8 July she moved to Buckner Bay, Okinawa, where she remained on supply duty until late October.

On 25 October Mayfield Victory got underway for home, stopping at Seattle, Washington, in December before arriving San Francisco 9 February 1946.

== Post-war decommissioning ==
She decommissioned 5 April 1946 and was delivered to the War Shipping Administration (WSA) for U.S. Maritime Commission service into 1969 as a freighter operated by American Mail Line, Seattle, Washington.
