= USNS Sgt. Andrew Miller =

Cargo ship of the United States Navy

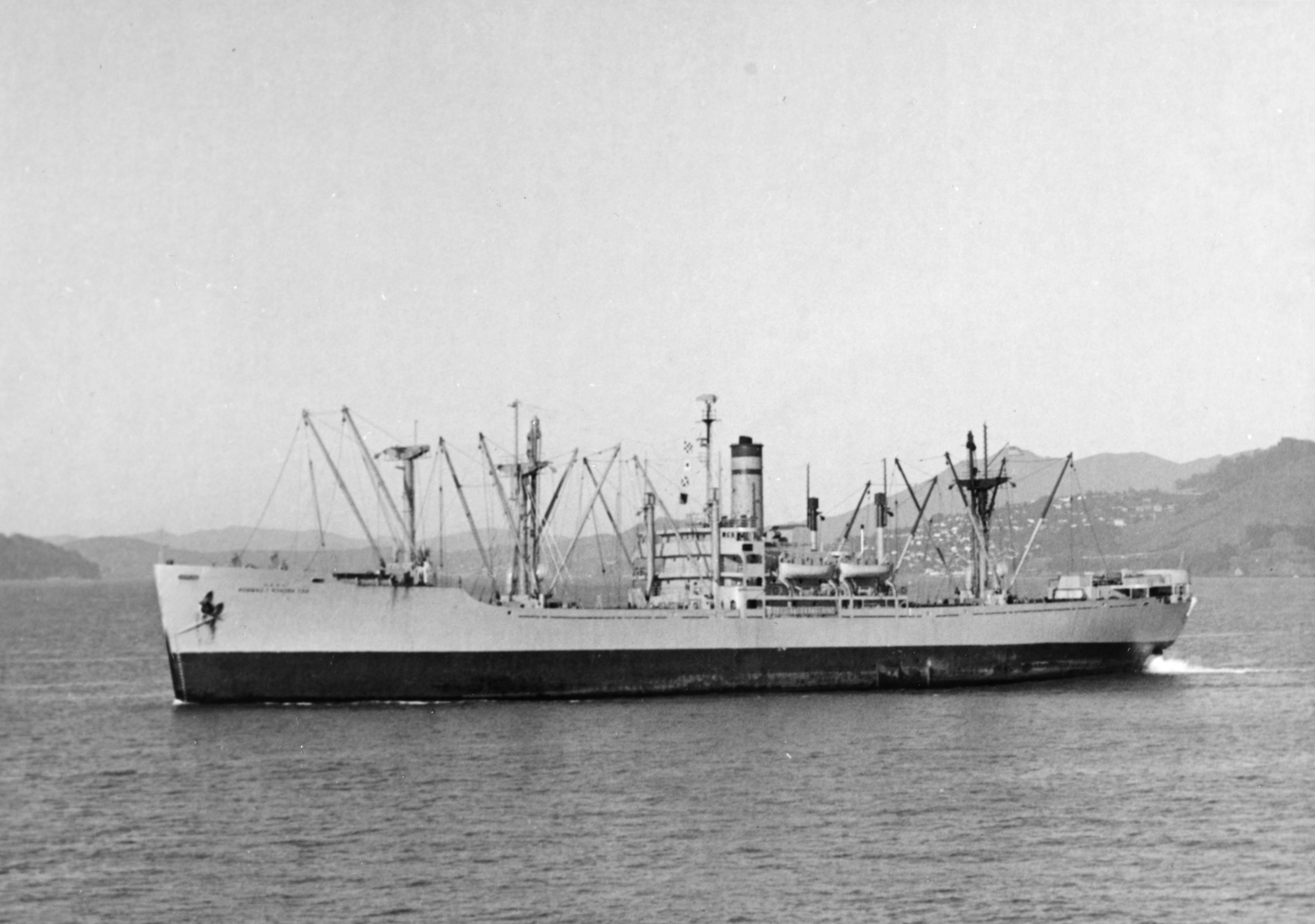
- USNS Sgt. Andrew Miller (T-AK-242) riding high in ballast, circa the 1960s

History

United States
- Name: Radcliffe Victory; Sgt. Andrew Miller
- Namesake: Radcliffe College; Andrew Miller
- Owner: War Shipping Administration
- Operator: American West African Lines
- Ordered: as type (VC2-S-AP2) hull, MCV hull 743
- Builder: Permanente Metals Corporation, Richmond, California
- Laid down: 22 February 1945, as SS Radcliffe Victory
- Launched: 4 April 1945
- Sponsored by: Mrs. Charles H. Owens
- Completed: 28 April 1945
- Acquired: by the US Army, 26 July 1946
- In service: 1 March 1950, as USNS Sgt. Andrew Miller (T-AK-242)
- Out of service: date unknown
- Renamed: 31 October 1947, USAT Sgt. Andrew Miller
- Stricken: 16 January 1981
- Homeport: San Francisco, California
- Identification: Hull symbol:T-AK-242
- Honours and awards: American Campaign Medal
- Fate: Scrapped November 1983

General characteristics
- Class & type: Boulder Victory-class cargo ship
- Displacement: 4,480 long tons (4,550 t) (standard); 15,580 long tons (15,830 t) (full load)
- Length: 455 ft (139 m)
- Beam: 62 ft (19 m)
- Draft: 29 ft 2 in (8.89 m)
- Installed power: 8,500 shp (6,300 kW)
- Propulsion: 1 × Steam turbine; 1 × shaft
- Speed: 15.5 kn (17.8 mph; 28.7 km/h)
- Complement: 99 officers and enlisted
- Armament: none

USNS Sgt. Andrew Miller (T-AK-242) was built as Victory ship SS Radcliffe Victory, a Boulder Victory-class cargo ship, built at the end of World War II. She served during the war and its demilitarization as a commercial cargo vessel operated by American West African Lines under charter with the Maritime Commission and War Shipping Administration. From 1946 to 1950, she served the US Army as a transport named USAT Sgt. Andrew Miller. In 1950, she was acquired by the US Navy and assigned to the Military Sea Transportation Service (MSTS). In 1981 she ended her career and was placed into reserve.

== Victory ship built in California ==
SS Radcliffe Victory was laid down on 22 February 1945, under a Maritime Commission (MARCOM) contract, MCV hull No. 743, by the Permanente Metals Corporation, Yard No. 2, Richmond, California; launched on 4 April 1945; sponsored by Mrs. Charles H. Owens; and delivered to MARCOM's War Shipping Administration (WSA) on 28 April 1945, for operation by the American-West African Line.

== US Army service ==
After the end of World War II, Radcliffe Victory was returned to WSA and was further transferred to the U.S. War Department for operation by the Army Transportation Corps on 26 July 1946. Renamed Sgt. Andrew Miller on 31 October 1947, the cargo ship remained with the Army Transportation Corps until 1 March 1950.

== Service with the MSTS ==
She was transferred to the Navy for operation by the newly established Military Sea Transportation Service (MSTS), becoming USNS Sgt. Andrew Miller (T-AK-242).

Homeported at San Francisco, California, Sgt. Andrew Miller made a round-trip run to Hawaii and back in April; and, in May, she sailed for Yokosuka, Japan. From there, she continued on to Naha, Okinawa, whence she returned to the U.S. West Coast.

=== Korean War service ===
Arriving after the outbreak of war in Korea, she loaded cargo for units being shipped to Japan and Korea; and, on 18 July, she sailed west. On 3 August, she stopped at Sasebo, Japan; and, on the 4th, she arrived off Pusan to commence offloading. Two weeks later, she started back across the Pacific Ocean to Hawaii, where she took on more cargo; and, on 15 September, she again sailed west.

During November, she delivered cargo at Inchon and Chinnampo; then put into Yokohama. In early December, she got underway for Wonsan but was diverted back to Yokohama, where she joined Task Group 90.2, the Hungnam evacuation force. On 13 December, she sailed for that North Korean port; where, from the 18th to the 20th, she took on men and equipment as units fought back to the harbor after the entry of Communist Chinese forces into the conflict.

The ship offloaded at Pusan; then returned to Sasebo, whence she made another run to Korea before sailing for Pearl Harbor and San Francisco. Arriving at the latter port in early February 1951, she made runs to bases in the Central Pacific Ocean and in the Aleutians into the summer; and, in August, she resumed runs to Japan and Korea.

During April and May 1952, she again carried cargo to islands in the Central Pacific; then, in June, returned to logistics support of United Nations forces in Korea. In September, her operations in the Far East were extended to include Okinawa; and, early in 1953, her calls at Central Pacific ports were made en route to the Far East. During the spring of that year, she resumed non-stop runs to Japan and Korea.

=== Vietnam operations ===
After the truce agreement in July 1953, Sgt. Andrew Miller continued runs to Japan and Korea and to the islands of the central and northern Pacific. In the summer of 1954, she was called on to assist in Operation Passage to Freedom which moved Vietnamese from Haiphong to Saigon following the division of the former French colony.

Following one run, she resumed her transpacific operations and expanded her range to include ports in Taiwan; in Thailand, and in the Philippine Islands. During the late 1950s and into the 1960s, she occasionally interrupted her Pacific operations for brief periods of service on transatlantic runs; but, into the fall of 1974, she remains in the Pacific in the Military Sealift Command (MSC) fleet. During the Fall of Saigon she participated in the MSC evacuation operation conducted concurrently with Operation Frequent Wind taking onboard 6148 refugees.

== Decommissioning ==
The ship was decommissioned at an unknown date and struck from the Navy List on 16 January 1981. She was returned to the U.S. Maritime Administration on 18 February 1983. She was scrapped in November 1983.

== Honors and awards ==
Eligible on-board personnel were authorized the following:

- National Defense Service Medal
- Korean Service Medal
- Armed Forces Expeditionary Medal - (Operation Frequent Wind)
- Vietnam Service Medal (1)
- United Nations Service Medal
- Republic of Vietnam Campaign Medal
- Republic of Korea War Service Medal

== See also ==
- List of Victory ships
- Liberty ship
- Type C1 ship
- Type C2 ship
- Type C3 ship
