= USS Las Vegas Victory =

Cargo ship of the United States Navy

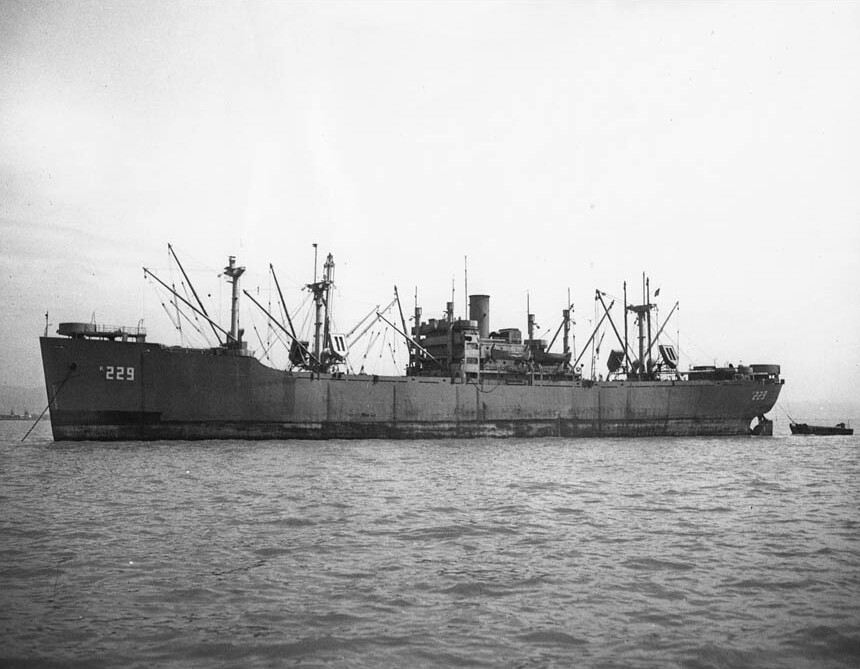
- USS Las Vegas Victory (AK-229) at anchor, probably in Puget Sound, at the end of 1945, or at San Francisco, after arriving there in February 1946.

History

United States
- Name: Las Vegas Victory
- Namesake: City of Las Vegas, Nevada
- Ordered: as type (VC2-S-AP2) hull, MCV hull 538
- Builder: Permanente Metals Corporation, Richmond, California
- Yard number: Yard No.1
- Laid down: 7 July 1944
- Launched: 16 September 1944
- Sponsored by: Mrs. E. W. Cragin
- Completed: 25 October 1944
- Commissioned: 25 October 1944
- Decommissioned: 8 April 1946
- Stricken: 17 April 1946
- Identification: Hull symbol: AK-229; IMO number: 5203798
- Honours and awards: one battle star for World War II service
- Fate: Scrapped, 22 December 1993

General characteristics
- Class & type: Boulder Victory-class cargo ship
- Displacement: 4,480 long tons (4,550 t) (standard); 15,580 long tons (15,830 t) (full load)
- Length: 455 ft (139 m)
- Beam: 62 ft (19 m)
- Draft: 29 ft 2 in (8.89 m)
- Installed power: 6,000 shp (4,500 kW)
- Propulsion: 1 × Westinghouse turbine; 2 × Foster Wheeler header-type boilers, 525psi 750°; double Westinghouse Main Reduction Gears; 1 × shaft
- Speed: 15.5 kn (17.8 mph; 28.7 km/h)
- Complement: 99 officers and enlisted
- Armament: 1 × 5 in (130 mm)/38-caliber dual-purpose gun; 1 × 3 in (76 mm)/50-caliber dual-purpose gun; 8 × 20 mm (0.79 in) Oerlikon cannons anti-aircraft gun mounts

USS Las Vegas Victory (AK-229) was a Boulder Victory-class cargo ship acquired by the U.S. Navy during World War II. She served in the Pacific Ocean theatre of operations through the end of the war earning one battle star, and then returned to the United States for disposal.

== Victory built in California ==
Las Vegas Victory, a cargo ship, was launched 1944, by Permanente Metals Corporation, Richmond, California; sponsored by Mrs. E. W. Cragin; acquired by the Navy 25 October 1944, and commissioned the same day.

== World War II operations ==
After shakedown along the U.S. West Coast. Las Vegas Victory departed Astoria, Oregon, 26 November for the Pacific islands. Sailing via Eniwetok and Ulithi, the cargo ship arrived Kossol Passage, Palau Islands, 31 December, laden with 7,600 tons of vital ammunition.

From January to March 1945, Las Vegas Victory shuttled ammunition among the Caroline Islands and the Marshall Islands, and replenished the fighting ships as they moved closer to the Japanese homeland. Departing Ulithi 25 March, she sailed for the rendezvous with units heading for Okinawa. Making her way through submarine infested waters, the cargo ship arrived off Okinawa on the 31st, and replenished two escort carriers with ammunition.

On 1 April the invasion of Okinawa started the removal of the last barrier "on the road to Japan". Under constant attack by Japanese suicide pilots, Las Vegas Victory passed ammunition to battleships, aircraft carriers, destroyers, and LCT's until late May. Arriving San Pedro, Leyte, 10 June, she loaded more ammunition and sailed for Eniwetok 19 July.

Upon her arrival 1 week later, she was assigned to the Pacific Service Force. Las Vegas Victory supported American forces in the Pacific Ocean until 7 November when she departed Eniwetok for the United States.

== Post-war decommissioning ==
The cargo ship arrived Port Discovery, Washington, 19 November; sailed for San Francisco, California, 15 February 1946; and decommissioned there 8 April for redelivery to the War Shipping Administration (WSA). She entered the National Defense Reserve Fleet and berthed at Puget Sound, Washington. On 25 February 2010, PMARS (Property Management and & Archive Record System) contact administrator advised that the USS Las Vegas Victory was sold for scrap in 1993.

== Honors and awards ==
Las Vegas Victory received one battle star for World War II service.
