= USS Lakewood Victory =

Cargo ship of the United States Navy

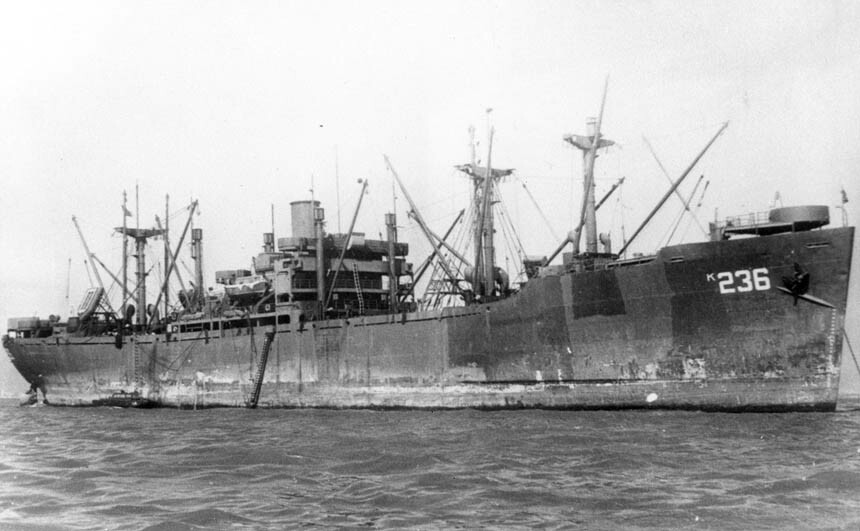
- USS Lakewood Victory (AK-236) at anchor, probably when she returned to San Francisco, in March 1946, after a postwar voyage to the Western Pacific. Her armament had been removed, probably during repair work at Puget Sound, in October and November 1945.

History

United States
- Name: Lakewood Victory
- Namesake: Lakewood, California, Lakewood, Colorado, Lakewood, New Jersey, Lakewood, New York, and; Lakewood, Ohio
- Ordered: as type (VC2-S-AP2) hull, MCV hull 545
- Builder: Permanente Metals Corporation, Richmond, California
- Yard number: 545
- Laid down: 16 September 1944
- Launched: 17 November 1944
- Sponsored by: Mrs. Edward A. Fitzgerald
- Commissioned: 11 December 1944
- Decommissioned: 16 May 1946
- Stricken: 5 June 1946
- Identification: Hull symbol: AK-236; IMO number: 5202718
- Honors and awards: two battle stars during World War II
- Fate: Sold for scrapping, 9 August 1993, to California Import Export Inc., for $368,512

General characteristics
- Class & type: Boulder Victory-class cargo ship
- Displacement: 4,480 long tons (4,550 t) (standard); 15,580 long tons (15,830 t) (full load)
- Length: 455 ft (139 m)
- Beam: 62 ft (19 m)
- Draft: 29 ft 2 in (8.89 m)
- Installed power: 6,000 shp (4,500 kW)
- Propulsion: 1 × Westinghouse turbine; 2 × Foster Wheeler header-type boilers, 525psi 750°; double Westinghouse Main Reduction Gears; 1 × shaft
- Speed: 15.5 kn (17.8 mph; 28.7 km/h)
- Complement: 99 officers and enlisted
- Armament: 1 × 5 in (130 mm)/38-caliber dual-purpose gun; 1 × 3 in (76 mm)/50-caliber dual-purpose gun; 8 × 20 mm (0.79 in) Oerlikon cannons anti-aircraft gun mounts

USS Lakewood Victory (AK-236) was a Boulder Victory-class cargo ship acquired by the U.S. Navy during World War II. She served in the Pacific Ocean theatre of operations through the end of the war, earning two battle stars, and then returned to the United States for disposal.

== Victory built in California ==
Lakewood Victory (AK-236) was laid down 16 September 1944, by Permanente Metals Corporation, Richmond, California, under a U.S. Maritime Commission contract; launched 17 November; sponsored by Mrs. Edward A. Fitzgerald; and commissioned 11 December.

== World War II operations ==
After shakedown, Lakewood Victory departed San Francisco, California, 18 January 1945 loaded with a cargo of ammunition, booms, and aircraft. Steaming via Pearl Harbor and Eniwetok, she reached the Mariana Islands in convoy 19 February and supplied combat ships with shells and powder.

Departing Saipan the 26th, she headed for Iwo Jima with Task Group 50.8. While the battle for Iwo Jima raged, she arrived the 28th and began supplying cruisers, destroyers, and landing craft with ammunition. She continued discharging her cargo until 8 March; then she sailed for the western Caroline Islands, arriving Ulithi the 11th.

On 3 April Lakewood Victory cleared Ulithi for logistics support operations off Okinawa. After reaching Kerama Retto 13 April, she supplied waiting destroyers, LSTs, and smaller landing craft with explosive cargo. She was the target of multiple Japanese Zero kamikaze attacks which war thwarted when American Destroyers and Battleships shot them out of the sky before they reached their targets. Her crew worked under cover of protective smoke to transfer ammunition before sailing 23 April for Ulithi, where she arrived the 28th.

Lakewood Victory sailed 20 May for the New Hebrides. Steaming via Manus, Admiralty Islands, she reached Espiritu Santo 28 May; loaded ammunition and fog oil; and departed 19 June for Leyte. She arrived San Pedro Bay the 28th and operated off Leyte for more than 2 months. After the Japanese surrender, she returned to the United States via the Mariana Islands and Pearl Harbor, arriving Puget Sound, Washington, 8 October.

After unloading her cargo, she sailed for the western Pacific Ocean 18 November. From 6 December to 2 March 1946 she loaded ammunition at Guam and Saipan.

== Post-war decommissioning and career ==
Returning to San Francisco 15 March, Lakewood Victory decommissioned 16 May and was turned over to the War Shipping Administration (WSA). Final disposition, sold for scrapping, 9 August 1993, to California Import Export Inc., for $368,512, removed from the Reserve Fleet anchorage, 25 September 1993.

== Honors and awards ==
Lakewood Victory received two battle stars for World War II service. Lakewood Victoryalso earned the American Campaign Medal, Asiatic-Pacific Campaign Medal, World War II Victory Medal and the Philippines Liberation Medal.
