= USNS Sgt. Archer T. Gammon =

Cargo ship of the United States Navy

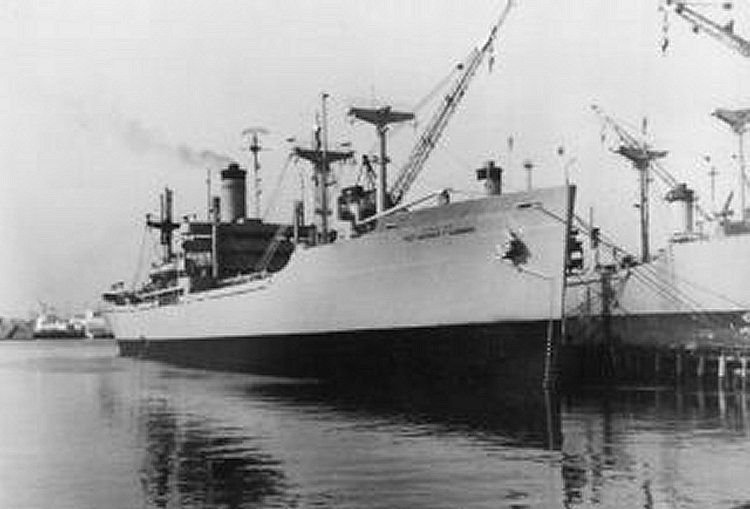
- USNS Archer T. Gammon (T-AK-243) moored pierside.

History

United States
- Name: Yale Victory; Sgt. Archer T. Gammon
- Namesake: Yale University; Archer T. Gammon awarded the Medal of Honor
- Ordered: as type (VC2-S-AP2) hull, MCV hull 725
- Builder: Permanente Metals Corporation, Richmond, California
- Laid down: 13 December 1944, as SS Yale Victory
- Launched: 31 January 1945
- Sponsored by: Mrs. Richard W. Owens
- Completed: 24 February 1945
- Acquired: 18 June 1946
- Commissioned: 31 October 1947 as USAT Sgt. Archer T. Gammon
- Decommissioned: 1 March 1950
- In service: 1 March 1950 as USNS Sgt. Archer T. Gammon (T-AK-243)
- Out of service: spring of 1973
- Stricken: 1 May 1973
- Identification: Hull symbol:T-AK-243
- Honours and awards: National Defense Service Medal
- Fate: Sold for scrapping, 9 November 1973, to Chi Shun Hua Steel Co., Ltd., of Kaohsiung, Taiwan

General characteristics
- Class & type: Boulder Victory-class cargo ship
- Displacement: 4,480 long tons (4,550 t) (standard); 15,580 long tons (15,830 t) (full load)
- Length: 455 ft (139 m)
- Beam: 62 ft (19 m)
- Draft: 29 ft 2 in (8.89 m)
- Installed power: 8,500 shp (6,300 kW)
- Propulsion: 1 × steam turbine; 1 × shaft
- Speed: 15.5 kn (17.8 mph; 28.7 km/h)
- Complement: 51 officers and enlisted
- Armament: none

USNS Sgt. Archer T. Gammon (T-AK-243) was a Boulder Victory-class cargo ship built at the end of World War II and served the war and its demilitarization as a commercial cargo vessel. From 1946 to 1950 she served the U.S. Army as a transport named USAT Sgt. Archer T. Gammon. In 1950 she was acquired by the United States Navy and assigned to the Military Sea Transportation Service. In 1973 she ended her career and was struck and scrapped.

== Victory ship built in California ==
Sgt. Archer T. Gammon was laid down under U.S. Maritime Commission contract as Yale Victory (MCV hull 725) on 13 December 1944 by the Permanente Metals Corporation, Richmond, California; launched on 31 January 1945; sponsored by Mrs. Richard W. Owens; and delivered to the U.S. Maritime Commission's War Shipping Administration (WSA) on 24 February for operation by the Olympic Steamship Company.

== U.S. Army service ==
On 18 June 1946, Yale Victory was transferred to the U.S. Army and commenced operations between San Francisco, California, and the Far East. Six months later, she changed her home port to Seattle, Washington; and, 31 October 1947, she was renamed Sgt. Archer T. Gammon. Two years later, the Military Sea Transportation Service (MSTS) was established; and, in March 1950, the cargo ship was transferred to the Navy for use in that organization and was placed in service as USNS Sgt. Archer T. Gammon (T-AK-243).

== Service with the MSTS ==
During the early 1950s, she operated out of Seattle to Japan, Korea and Alaska. After the end of the Korean War, her range was extended. In the mid and late 1950s, she operated out of San Francisco to central and western Pacific Ocean ports and, during the periods of conflict in the Middle East, to Caribbean and western and eastern Atlantic Ocean areas.

In 1961, administrative control of the ship was transferred to MSTS, Atlantic, at New York City; and, since that time, Sgt. Archer T. Gammon continued to carry cargo for the Navy's transportation service, since renamed the Military Sealift Command, until the spring of 1973 when she was transferred to the U.S. Maritime Administration for disposal

== Decommissioning ==
Her name was struck from the Navy List on 1 May 1973, and her hulk was sold to Chi Shun Hua Steel Co., Ltd., of Kaohsiung, Taiwan, on 19 November 1973.

== Honors and awards ==
Qualified vessel personnel were eligible for the following:

- National Defense Service Medal
- Korean Service Medal
- United Nations Service Medal
- Republic of Korea War Service Medal
