= USS Provo Victory =

Cargo ship of the United States Navy

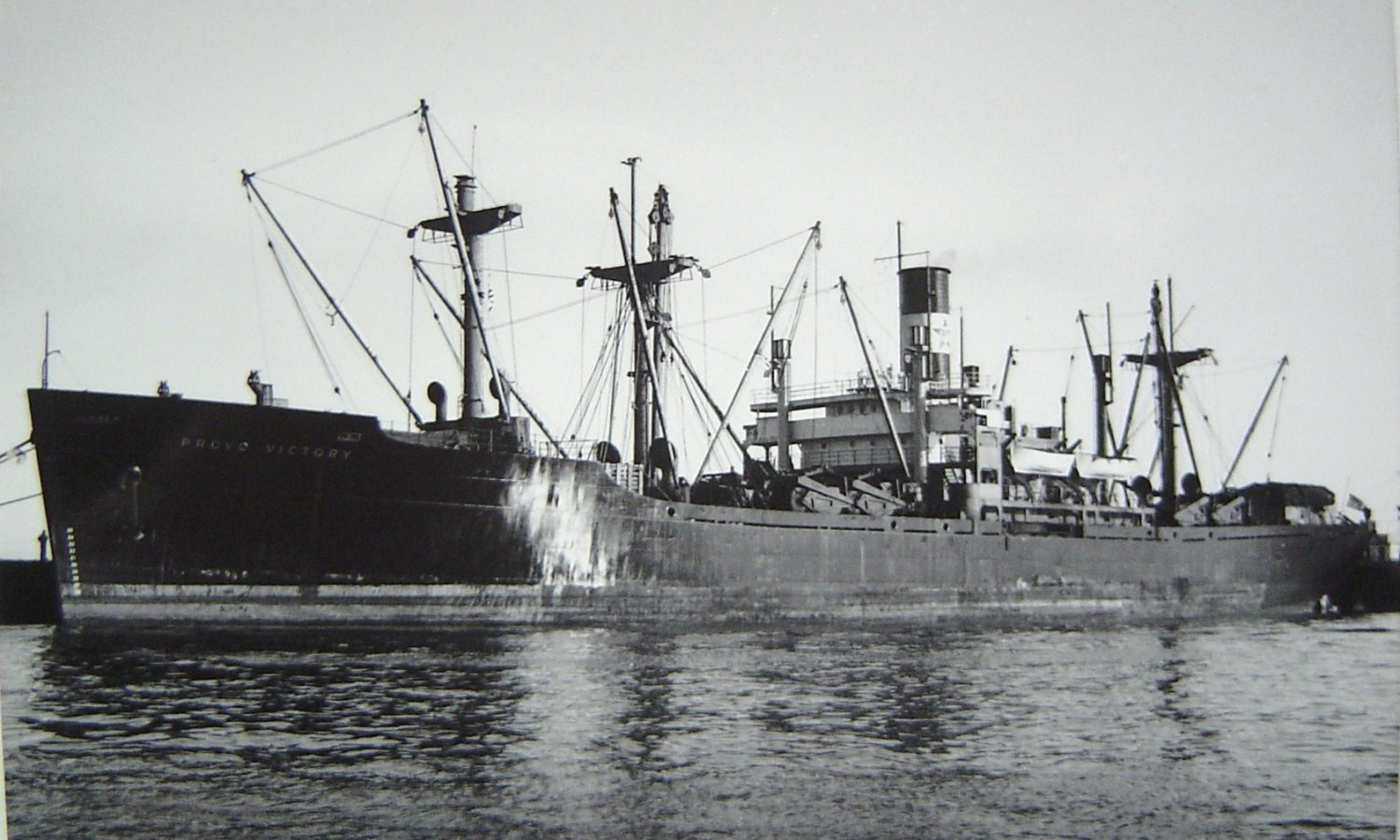
- Ex-USS Provo Victory (AK-228) in Pope & Talbot colors.

History

United States
- Name: Provo Victory
- Namesake: City of Provo, Utah
- Ordered: as type (VC2-S-AP2) hull, MCV hull 537
- Builder: Permanente Metals Corporation, Richmond, California
- Yard number: 537
- Laid down: 28 June 1944
- Launched: 9 September 1944
- Acquired: 18 October 1944
- Commissioned: 18 October 1944
- Decommissioned: 10 April 1946
- Stricken: 8 May 1946
- Home port: San Francisco
- Identification: Hull symbol: AK-228; IMO number: 5286219; Call sign: KSUS
- Fate: traded out for scrapping, 10 February 1984, to Nissho-Iwi Corp. Tokyo, Japan

General characteristics
- Class & type: Boulder Victory-class cargo ship
- Displacement: 4,480 long tons (4,550 t) (standard); 15,580 long tons (15,830 t) (full load)
- Length: 455 ft (139 m)
- Beam: 62 ft (19 m)
- Draft: 29 ft 2 in (8.89 m)
- Installed power: 6,000 shp (4,500 kW)
- Propulsion: 1 × Westinghouse turbine; 2 × Babcock & Wilcox header-type boilers, 525psi 750°; double Westinghouse Main Reduction Gears; 1 × shaft
- Speed: 15.5 kn (17.8 mph; 28.7 km/h)
- Complement: 99 officers and enlisted
- Armament: 1 × 5 in (130 mm)/38-caliber dual-purpose gun; 1 × 3 in (76 mm)/50-caliber dual-purpose gun; 8 × 20 mm (0.79 in) Oerlikon cannons anti-aircraft gun mounts

USS Provo Victory (AK-228) was a Boulder Victory-class cargo ship acquired by the U.S. Navy during World War II. She served in the Pacific Ocean theatre of operations through the end of the war, and then returned to the United States for disposal.

== Victory built in Richmond, California ==
Provo Victory (AK–228) was laid down 28 June 1944, by Permanente Metals Corporation #1, Richmond, California, as S.S. Provo Victory (MCV hull 537); launched 9 September 1944; acquired by the Navy 18 October, and commissioned 18 October 1944.

== World War II service ==
Following shakedown off California, Provo Victory (AK–228) reported for duty 8 November 1944. In 1944 she operated at San Francisco, California, in November, and then at Eniwetok, Ulithi, and the Palau Islands from December 1944 into February 1945.

During the remainder of 1945, her cargo duties took her to Guam and Pearl Harbor in March, Seattle, Washington, in April, Ulithi in May, Leyte from June to October, Eniwetok and Seattle in November.

== Post-war decommissioning ==
Decommissioned 10 April 1946, she was returned to the War Shipping Administration at Seattle, Washington, that day, and was struck from the Naval Vessel Register 8 May 1946.

== Korean War ==
She helped with the Hungnam Evacuation with the Military Sea Transportation Service and Merchant Ships participating in Hungnam Korea Redeployment.
