= USS Manderson Victory =

Cargo ship of the U.S. Navy during World War II

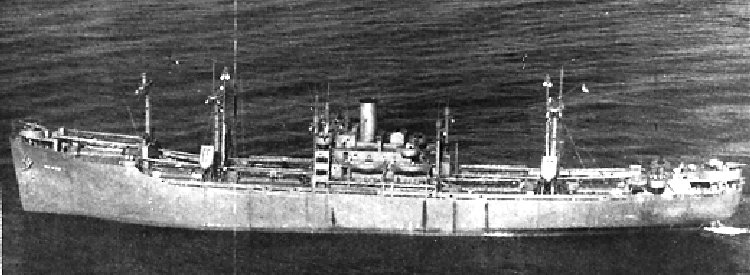
- USS Manderson Victory (AK-230) underway

History

United States
- Name: Manderson Victory
- Namesake: City of Manderson, Wyoming
- Ordered: as type (VC2-S-AP2) hull, MCV hull 539
- Builder: Permanente Metals Corporation, Richmond, California
- Yard number: Yard No.1
- Laid down: 4 July 1944
- Launched: 23 September 1944
- Sponsored by: Mrs. Florence Robertson
- Acquired: 3 November 1944
- Commissioned: 3 November 1944
- Decommissioned: 10 May 1946
- Stricken: date unknown
- Identification: Hull symbol: AK-230; IMO number: 5219175
- Honors and awards: one battle star for World War II service
- Fate: Sold for scrapping, 4 August 1993, to Nishant Import and Export Co.

General characteristics
- Class & type: Boulder Victory-class cargo ship
- Displacement: 4,480 long tons (4,550 t) (standard); 15,580 long tons (15,830 t) (full load)
- Length: 455 ft (139 m)
- Beam: 62 ft (19 m)
- Draft: 29 ft 2 in (8.89 m)
- Installed power: 6,000 shp (4,500 kW)
- Propulsion: 1 × Westinghouse turbine; 2 × Foster Wheeler header-type boilers, 525psi 750°; double Westinghouse Main Reduction Gears; 1 × shaft
- Speed: 15.5 kn (17.8 mph; 28.7 km/h)
- Complement: 99 officers and enlisted
- Armament: 1 × 5 in (130 mm)/38-caliber dual-purpose gun; 1 × 3 in (76 mm)/50-caliber dual-purpose gun; 8 × 20 mm (0.79 in) Oerlikon cannons anti-aircraft gun mounts

USS Manderson Victory (AK-230) was a Boulder Victory-class cargo ship acquired by the U.S. Navy during World War II. She served in the Pacific Ocean theatre of operations through the end of the war, earning one battle star, and then returned to the United States for disposal.

== Victory built in California ==
Manderson Victory (AK 230) was laid down 4 July 1944, by Permanente Metals Corporation, Yard No. 1, Richmond, California, under a U.S. Maritime Commission contract; launched 23 September 1944; sponsored by Mrs. Florence Robertson; transferred to the Navy 3 November 1944; and commissioned the same day at the Mare Island Navy Yard.

== World War II operations ==
After shakedown off San Pedro, California, Manderson Victory loaded ammunition and planes on board and sailed for Hawaii 5 December to join Service Squadron 10, U.S. Pacific Fleet. She arrived Pearl Harbor 11 December.

Discharging her cargo of planes, Manderson Victory departed for the Caroline Islands, arriving Ulithi Atoll 26 December. She transported ammunition in the western Pacific Ocean into June 1945, with two voyages to the Ryukyu Islands from 28 March to 17 June 1945 during the assault and occupation of Okinawa. Departing Ulithi for the Philippine Islands 19 June 1945, the cargo ship arrived San Pedro Bay in the Philippine Islands 22 June and resumed her logistic support.

On 3 November Manderson Victory left for the United States, arriving Seattle, Washington, 23 November. She continued on to the U.S. East Coast 17 February 1946 via the Panama Canal and Puerto Rico, docking at New York City 24 April.

== Post-war decommissioning ==
Manderson Victory decommissioned 10 May 1946 and was returned to the War Shipping Administration (WSA) the same day. She entered the Maritime Commission National Defense Reserve Fleet at James River Group, Virginia, 17 October 1953.

In July 1966 Manderson Victory was leased under General Agency Agreement to Farrell Lines, Inc., New York, New York, for service as a freighter.

== Honors and awards ==
Manderson Victory received one battle star for World War II service.
