= SS Red Oak Victory =

Victory ship of WWII

- SS Red Oak Victory

History

United States
- Name: Red Oak Victory
- Namesake: The city of Red Oak, Iowa
- Builder: Permanente Metals Corporation, Richmond, California
- Yard number: 544
- Laid down: 9 September 1944
- Launched: 7 November 1944
- Acquired: 5 December 1944
- Commissioned: 5 December 1944
- Decommissioned: 21 May 1946
- Out of service: 19 December 1969
- Stricken: 19 July 1946
- Identification: Hull symbol: AK-235; IMO number: 5291331; Callsign: KYVM
- Fate: Released from the National Defense Reserve Fleet, 19 September 1998 for restoration at the Richmond, California, Museum of History
- Status: Museum at Richmond, California

General characteristics
- Class & type: Boulder Victory-class cargo ship
- Displacement: 4,480 long tons (4,550 t) (standard); 15,580 long tons (15,830 t) (full load)
- Length: 455 ft (139 m)
- Beam: 62 ft (19 m)
- Draft: 29 ft 2 in (8.89 m)
- Installed power: 6,000 shp (4,500 kW)
- Propulsion: 1 × Westinghouse turbine; 2 × Babcock & Wilcox header-type boilers, 525psi 750°; double Westinghouse Main Reduction Gears; 1 × shaft
- Speed: 15.5 kn (17.8 mph; 28.7 km/h)
- Complement: 99 officers and enlisted
- Armament: 1 × 5 in (130 mm)/38 caliber dual purpose gun; 1 × 3 in (76 mm)/50 caliber dual purpose gun; 8 × 20 mm (0.79 in) Oerlikon cannons anti-aircraft gun mounts
- SS Red Oak Victory
- U.S. National Register of Historic Places
- SS Red Oak Victory as seen from the dock in 2006, before extensive restoration work was performed

- Location within California Location within the United States
- Location: Richmond, California
- Coordinates: 37°54′17.3″N 122°21′52″W
- Built: 1944
- NRHP reference No.: 00001674
- Added to NRHP: 30 January 2000

SS Red Oak Victory is a U.S. Victory ship of the Boulder Victory-class cargo ship used in the Second World War. She was preserved to serve as a museum ship in Richmond, California, and is managed by the Richmond Library of History and located near the Rosie the Riveter/World War II Home Front National Historical Park. She was one of 534 Victories built during World War II, but one of only a few of these ships to be transferred from the Merchant Marine to the United States Navy. She was named after Red Oak, Iowa, which suffered disproportionate casualties in early World War II battles. Montgomery County ranked third among Iowa counties in World War II casualties per capita. The ship was active during World War II, the Korean War, and the Vietnam War.

== History ==
Red Oak Victory was built by the Permanente Metals Corporation's Richmond Number 1 Yard in Richmond, California and launched on 9 November 1944. The ship is 455 feet (139 m) in length, and armed with one five-inch/38 caliber gun; one three-inch/50 caliber gun, and eight 20 mm guns.

The ship was acquired by the United States Navy on 5 December 1944, and commissioned the same day as USS Red Oak Victory (AK-235). Following a fitting-out period, Red Oak Victory was loaded with cargo and departed San Francisco for Pearl Harbor on 10 January 1945. Red Oak Victory departed Hawaii on 10 February loaded with munitions needed in the Marshall and Caroline islands. Sent onward from Enewetak, she arrived in Ulithi on 28 February and then began operating under Commander Service Squadron Ten. Operating out of the Philippines, she issued cargo and ammunition to various fleet ships through the war's end in August 1945. During a hazardous tour of duty in the Pacific, Red Oak Victory handled many tons of ammunition, supplying the fleet without a single casualty.

Red Oak Victory was decommissioned in 1946 and returned to the U.S. Maritime Commission. Red Oak Victory was used by the Luckenbach Steamship Company from 1947 through the 1950s, when the vessel went to Japan, Korea, Cuba, Pakistan, India, Singapore, and Japan again. Red Oak Victory was operated by American Mail Lines for the Military Sea Transport Service from 1966 to 1968, making a dozen voyages to Vietnam, Japan, and the Philippines carrying military supplies loaded at West Coast ports. From 1968 until 1998, she was laid up in the National Defense Reserve Fleet in Suisun Bay.

Destined to be scrapped, Red Oak Victory came to the attention of the Richmond Museum Association in 1993. In 1996 Congress passed legislation authorizing the ship's conveyance to the Museum Association. Red Oak Victory was turned over to the Richmond Museum of History and towed to a new home in Richmond Shipyard 3 (near the location where Shipyard 1 was, where the ship was actually built in 1944) on 20 September 1998. She is being restored and operated by the Richmond Museum of History and is associated with the Rosie the Riveter World War II Home Front National Historical Park.

== See also ==
- National Register of Historic Places listings in Contra Costa County, California
