= Gammans =

Gammans is a surname. Notable people with the surname include:

- David Gammans (1895–1957), British politician
- Muriel Gammans (1898–1989), British politician, wife of David

== See also ==
- Gammans Baronets
- Gamman
- Gammons
