= Boulder Victory–class cargo ship =

Class of US Navy cargo ship late 1940s

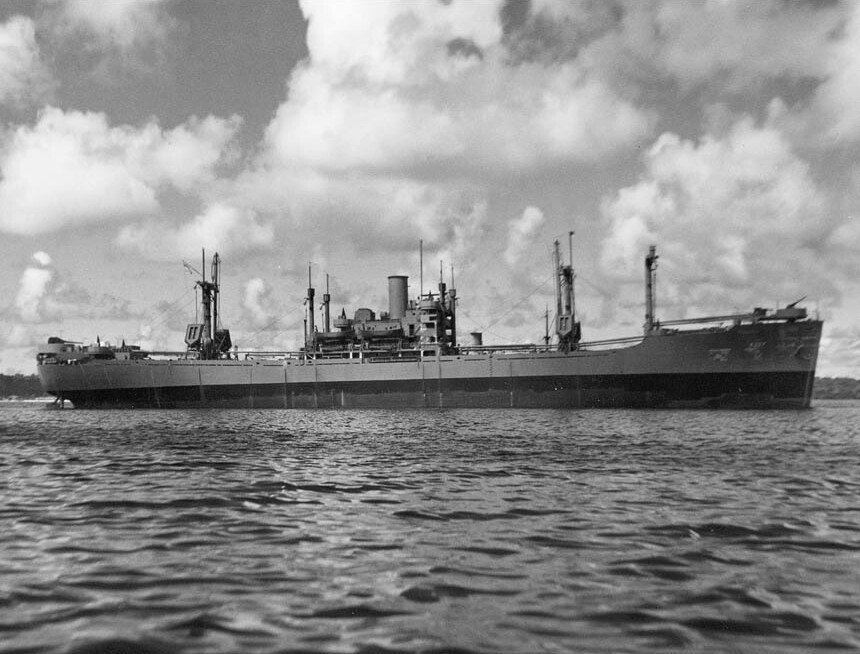
- USS Boulder Victory (AK-227) at Ulithi, 9 June 1945, lead ship of class.

Class overview
- Name: Boulder Victory class
- Builders: California Shipbuilding; Bethlehem Shipbuilding Corporation; Permanente Metals
- Preceded by: Liberty ships
- Succeeded by: Greenville Victory class
- Built: 1944–1945
- In commission: October 1944 – October 1945
- Completed: 20
- Retired: 19
- Preserved: 1

General characteristics
- Type: Cargo ship
- Tonnage: 7,607 GRT
- Displacement: 4,480 long tons (4,550 t) (standard); 15,580 long tons (15,830 t) (full load)
- Length: 455 ft (139 m)
- Beam: 62 ft (19 m)
- Draft: 29 ft 2 in (8.89 m)
- Installed power: 2 × Babcock & Wilcox header-type boilers, 525psi 750°; 6,000 shp (4,500 kW)
- Propulsion: 1 × Westinghouse turbine; double Westinghouse Main Reduction Gears; 1 × shaft
- Speed: 15.5 kn (17.8 mph; 28.7 km/h)
- Capacity: 7,800 t (7,700 long tons) DWT; 453,210 cu ft (12,833 m^{3}) (non-refrigerated)
- Complement: 99 officers and enlisted
- Armament: 1 × 5 in (127 mm)/38-caliber dual-purpose gun; 1 × 3 in (76 mm)/50-caliber dual-purpose gun; 8 × 20 mm (0.8 in) Oerlikon anti-aircraft (AA) gun mounts

The Boulder Victory–class cargo ship was a cargo ship design shipping use during World War II by the United States Navy. The Boulder Victory–class design is the same as the Victory ships built for the World War II United States Merchant Navy. A total of 20 Boulder Victory–class cargo ships were built in 1944 and 1945. Some of the ships were launched as Victory ships and then acquired by the United States Navy for the war effort. Some of the vessels were acquired by the United States Army and used in the U.S. Army Transportation Service. A few of the Boulder Victory–class cargo ships also served in the Korean War. Only one ship survived being scrapped, SS Red Oak Victory, now a museum ship at Richmond, California. Some the Boulder Victory–class cargo ships also served in the Military Sea Transportation Service of the United States Navy after World War II. Arriving late in the war, most of the Boulder Victory–class cargo ships operated in the Pacific theater, delivering needed supplies to the US Navy, US Army and United States Marine Corps. The ships were built under the Emergency Shipbuilding program for the War Shipping Administration. The ships were given the prefix of "AK" for auxiliary ship cargo. The lead ship in the class the, Boulder Victory was commissioned on 12 October 1944. Boulder Victory operated first as an ammunition ship, then a general supply ship. After the war Boulder Victory served as a seagoing cowboys ship helping with War Relief to war torn Europe.

== Ships in class ==
A total of 20 Boulder Victory–class cargo ships were built and commissioned:

- USS Boulder Victory (AK-227), damaged by mine on 20 December 1944, scrapped in 1984 after US Navy service and merchant ship service.
- USS Bedford Victory (AK-231), scrapped 28 March 1972 after war relief and merchant ship service.
- USNS Lt. Robert Craig (T-AK-252), built as SS Bowling Green Victory, scrapped in 1974 after U.S. Army Transportation Service and US Navy Ship use.
- USS Bucyrus Victory (AK-234), scrapped in October 1969 after merchant ship service.
- USNS Sgt. Truman Kimbro (T-AK-254) built as SS Hastings Victory, scrapped in 1982 after merchant ship service, US Navy service and Military Sea Transportation Service.
- USS Lakewood Victory (AK-236) scrapped in 1993 after US Navy service and merchant ship service.
- USS Las Vegas Victory (AK-229) scrapped in 1993 after US Navy service and merchant ship service.
- USS Manderson Victory (AK-230) scrapped in 1993 after US Navy service and merchant ship service.
- USS Mayfield Victory (AK-232) scrapped in 1993 after US Navy service and merchant ship service.
- USNS Sgt. Morris E. Crain (T-AK-244) built as SS Mills Victory, scrapped in 1975 after merchant ship service, US Army Transportation Service and Military Sea Transportation Service.
- USS Newcastle Victory (AK-233) scrapped in 1992 after US Navy service and merchant ship service.
- USNS Private Joe E. Mann (T-AK-253) (USNS Richfield) built at SS Owensboro Victory, scrapped in 1976 after merchant ship service and US Army Transportation Corps service.
- USS Provo Victory (AK-228) scrapped in 1984 after US Navy service and merchant ship service.
- USNS Sgt. Andrew Miller (T-AK-242) built as SS Radcliffe Victory scrapped in 1983 after merchant ship service and US Army Transportation Service.
- USNS Red Oak Victory (T-AK-235) built as SS Red Oak Victory, Museum Ship at Richmond, California after merchant ship service, US Navy and merchant ship service.
- USNS Sgt. Sylvester Antolak (T-AP-192) built as SS Stetson Victory scrapped in 1972 after merchant ship service and Military Sea Transportation Service.
- USNS Private Joe P. Martinez (T-AP-187) built as SS SS Stevens Victory scrapped in 1971 after merchant ship service, United States Army Transportation Service and Military Sea Transportation Service.
- Private Francis X. McGraw built as SS Wabash Victory scrapped in 1974 after merchant ship service, United States Army Transportation Service and Military Sea Transportation Service.
- Lt. George W. G. Boyce built as SS Waterville Victory scrapped in 1974 after merchant ship service, United States Army Transportation Service and Military Sea Transportation Service.
- Sgt. Archer T. Gammon built as SS Yale Victory scrapped in 1973 after merchant ship service, United States Army Transportation Service and Military Sea Transportation Service.

== Design ==
Victory ships replace the numerous built Liberty ships. Victory ship/Boulder Victory–class cargo ships are fast and better built than the Liberty ships, with a top speed of 15–17 knots (28–31 km/h; 17–20 mph). Liberty ships had a top speed of only 11–11.5 knots (20.4–21.3 km/h; 12.7–13.2 mph). Victory ships had more powerful steam turbine engines compared to the Liberty ship's triple-expansion steam engine. Victory ships are also slightly larger than the Liberty ships. Both Liberty ships and Boulder Victory ships have large hatches on the holds, and kingpost with large capacity booms cranes. This allowed the ship to unload and load without a dock crane.

- The USNS Private Joe E. Mann (T-AK-253) was later upgraded to be a Longview-class missile range instrumentation ship (T-AGM) in 1960.

== Builders ==
- Fifteen built by Permanente Metals at Richmond Shipyards in Richmond, California.
- Three built by Bethlehem-Fairfield Shipyard, Inc. at Baltimore, Maryland.
- Two built by California Shipbuilding at Terminal Island in Los Angeles, California.
- Other shipyards built Merchant Victory ships.

== Crew ==
Boulder Victory–class cargo ships were crewed by 99 officers and enlisted. This included: captain, executive officer (XO), radioman, signalman, navigation officer, engineering officer, deckhands, chefs, stewards, boatswain's mate (BM), and quartermasters, gunners and fire controlman for the one stern 5 in (127 mm)/38-caliber dual-purpose gun; the one bow 3 in (76 mm)/50-caliber dual-purpose gun; and the eight 20 mm (0.79 in) Oerlikon anti-aircraft (AA) autocannon.

== Gallery ==
USNS Red Oak Victory (T-AK-235) built as SS Red Oak Victory now a Museum Ship at Richmond, California

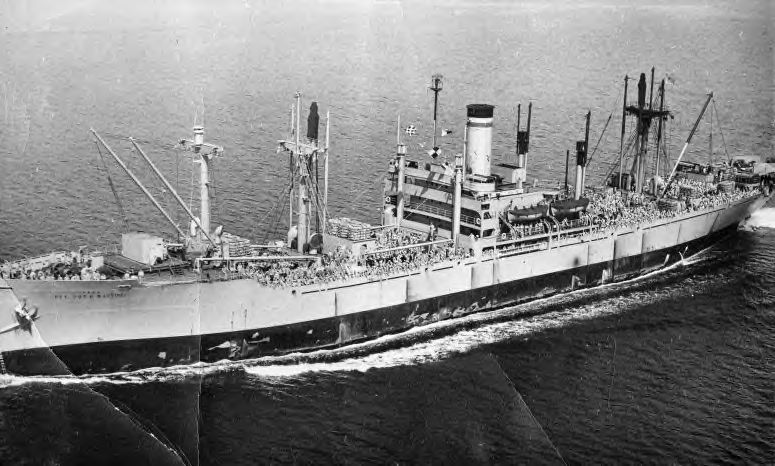
USNS Private Joe P. Martinez (T-AP-187) arriving in Seattle, WA., 27 Dec 1951 with Korean War veterans

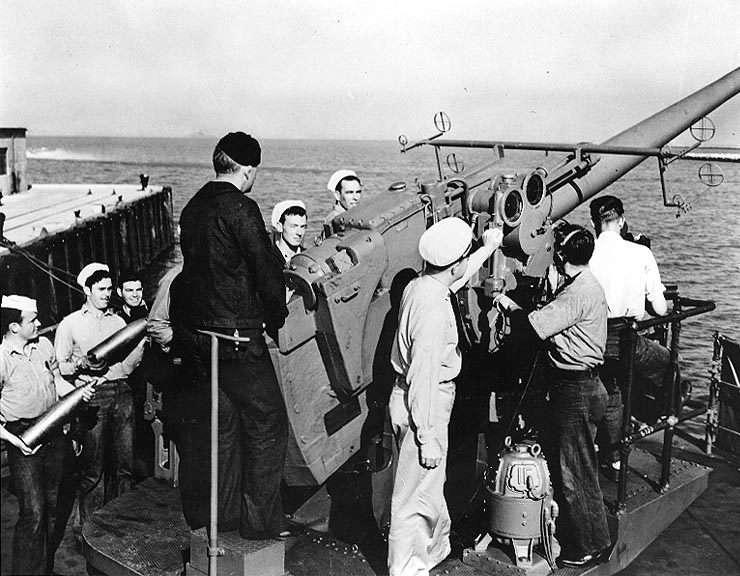
A Mk 21 5"/38 caliber open pedestal mount like the one on the stern of a Boulder Victory Class cargo ship.

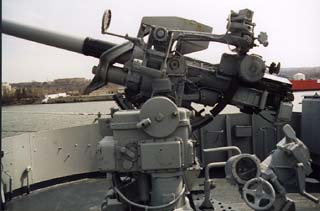
A 3 in (76 mm)/50-caliber dual-purpose gun like the one on the bow of a Boulder Victory Class cargo ship.

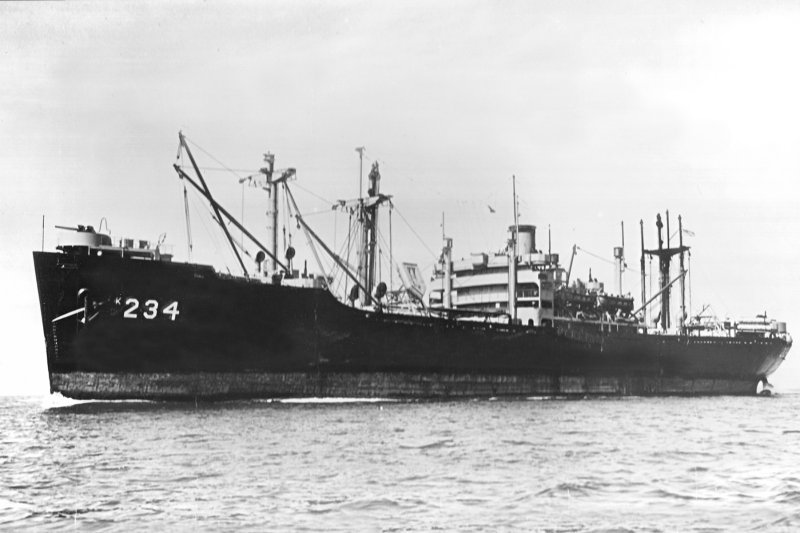
USS Bucyrus Victory (AK-234) probably photographed when she returned to San Francisco from the Western Pacific in December 1945.

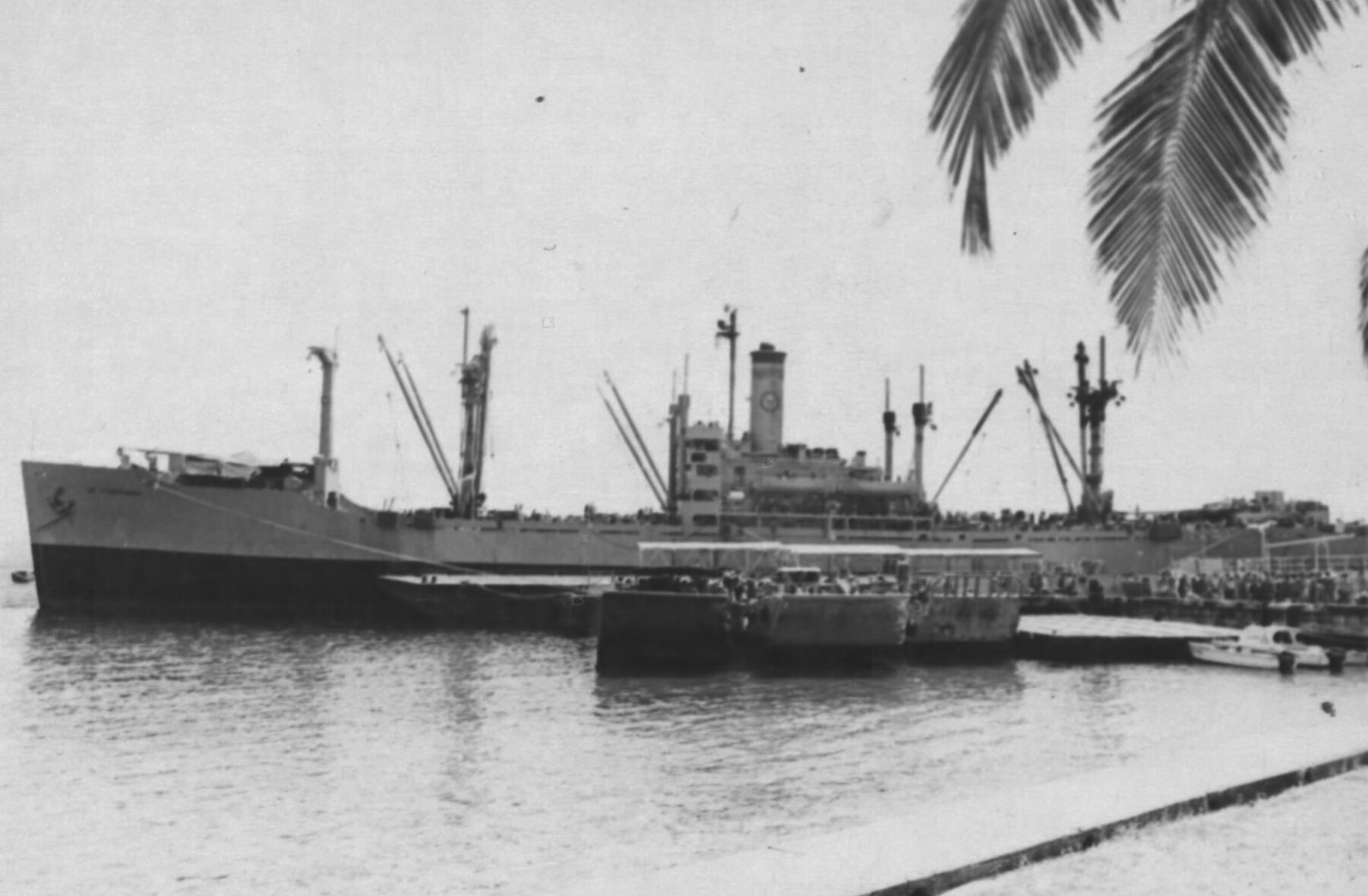
USNS Sgt. Truman Kimbro at Subic Bay in May 1975

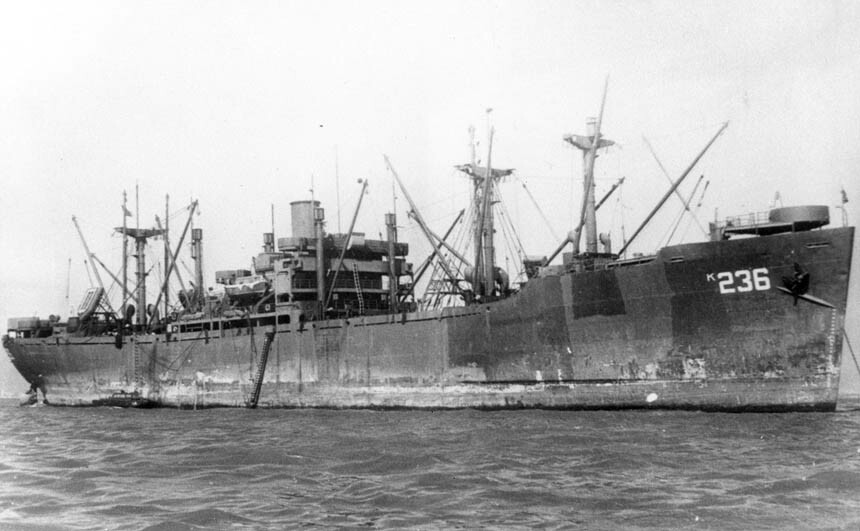
USS Lakewood Victory (AK-236) at anchor, probably when she returned to San Francisco, in March 1946, after a postwar voyage to the Western Pacific. Her armament had been removed, probably during repair work at Puget Sound, in October and November 1945.

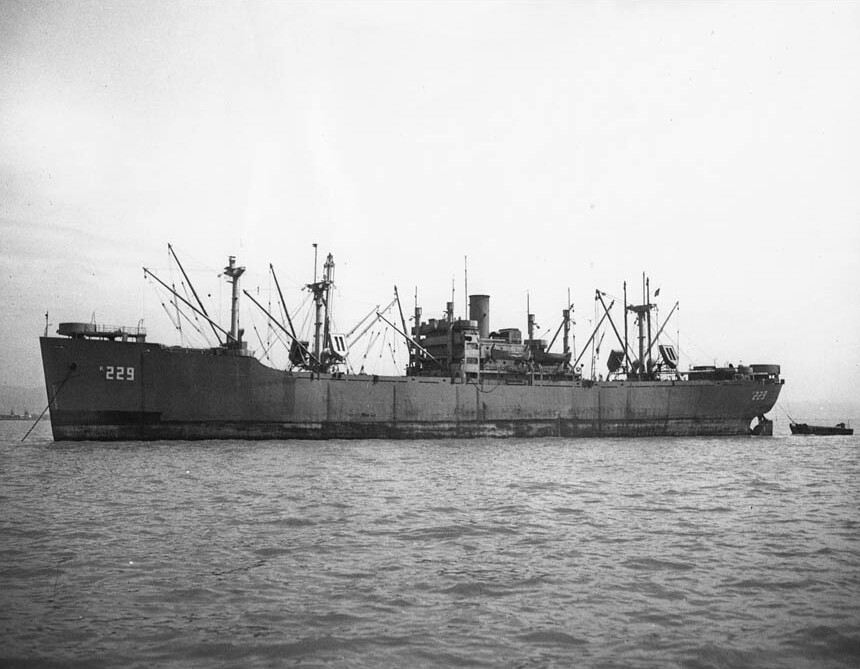
USS Las Vegas Victory (AK-229) at anchor, probably in Puget Sound, at the end of 1945, or at San Francisco, after arriving there in February 1946.

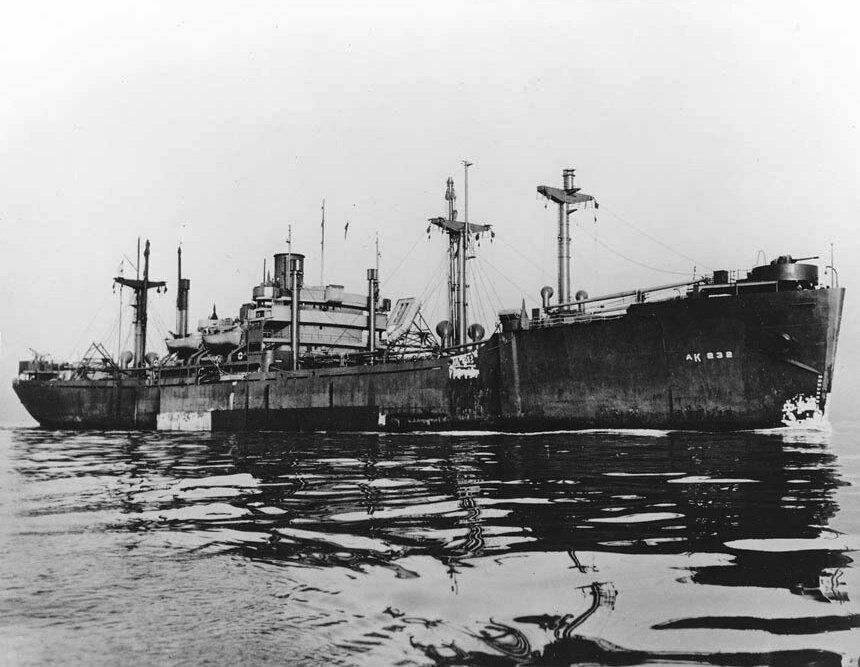
USS Mayfield Victory (AK-232)

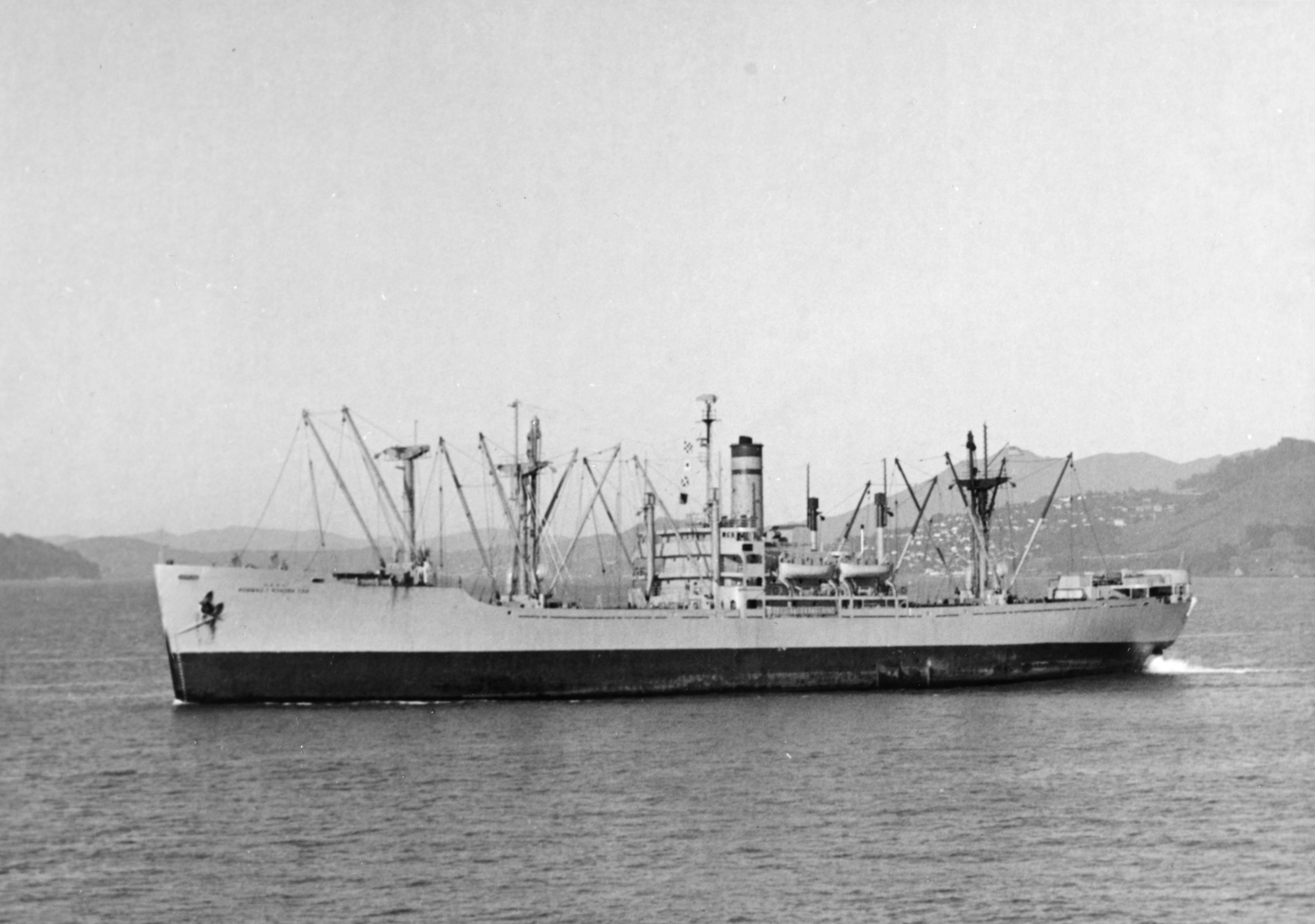
USNS Sgt. Andrew Miller (T-AK-242) riding high in ballast, circa the 1960s

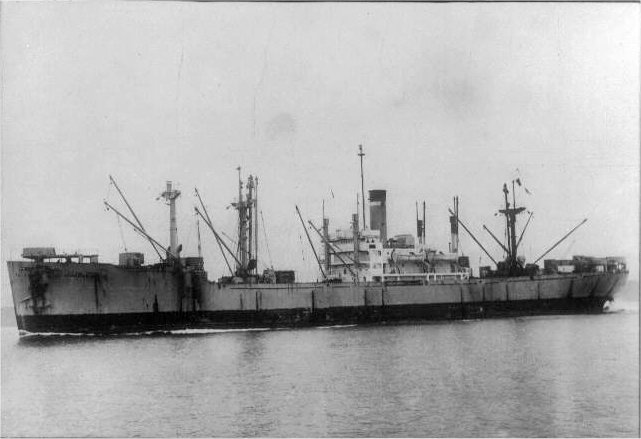
USAT Sgt. Sylvester Antolak underway, 1947

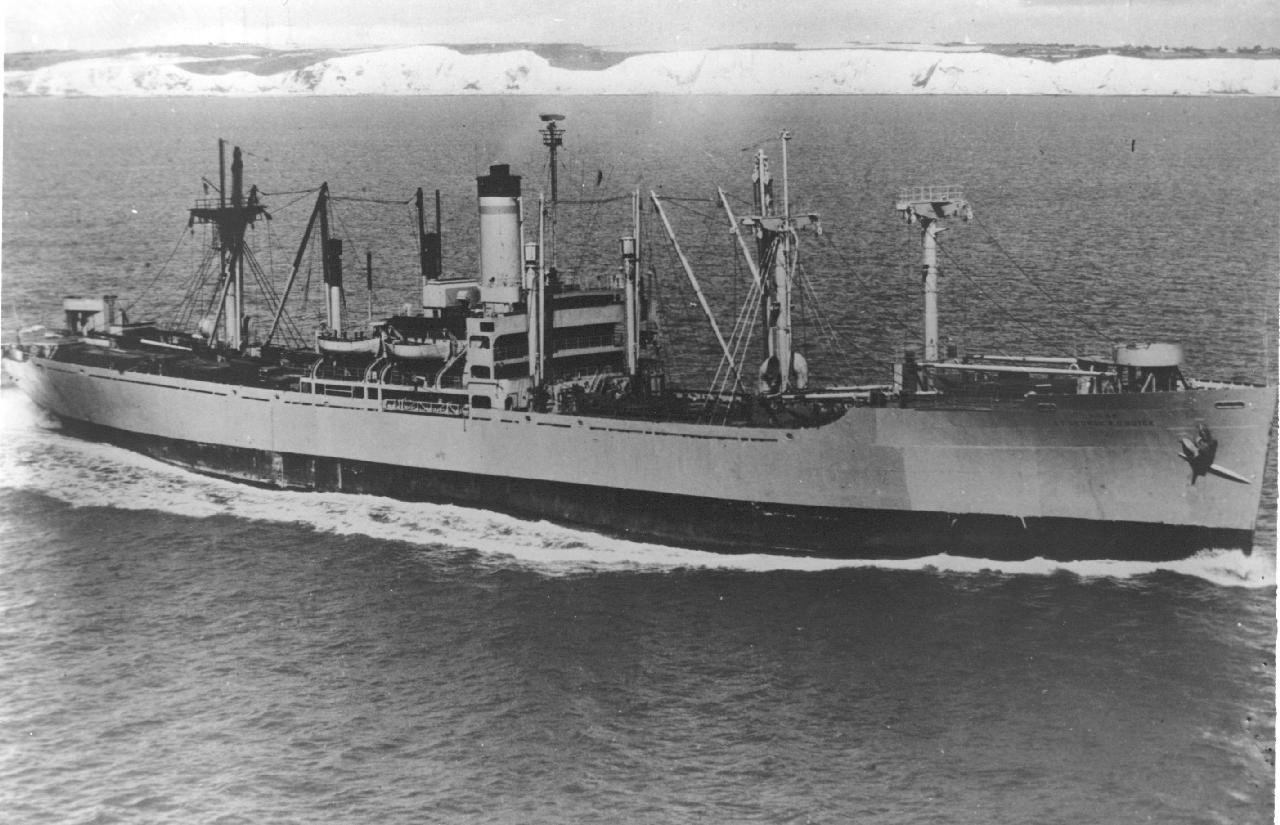
USNS Lt. George W. G. Boyce (T-AK-251) underway.

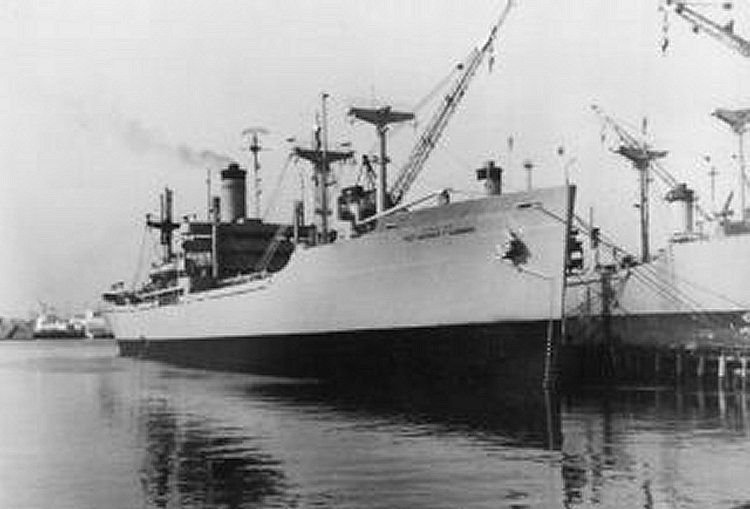
USNS Archer T. Gammon (T-AK-243) moored pierside

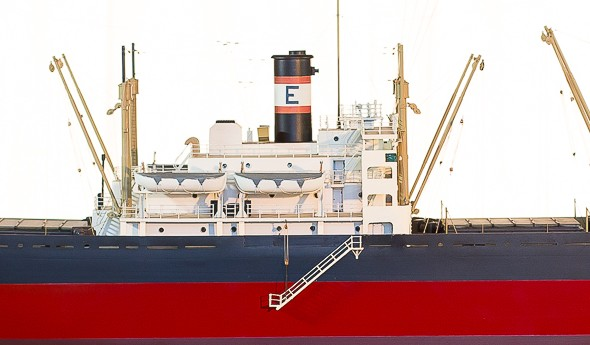
Boulder Victory–class cargo ship superstructure and center boom cranes

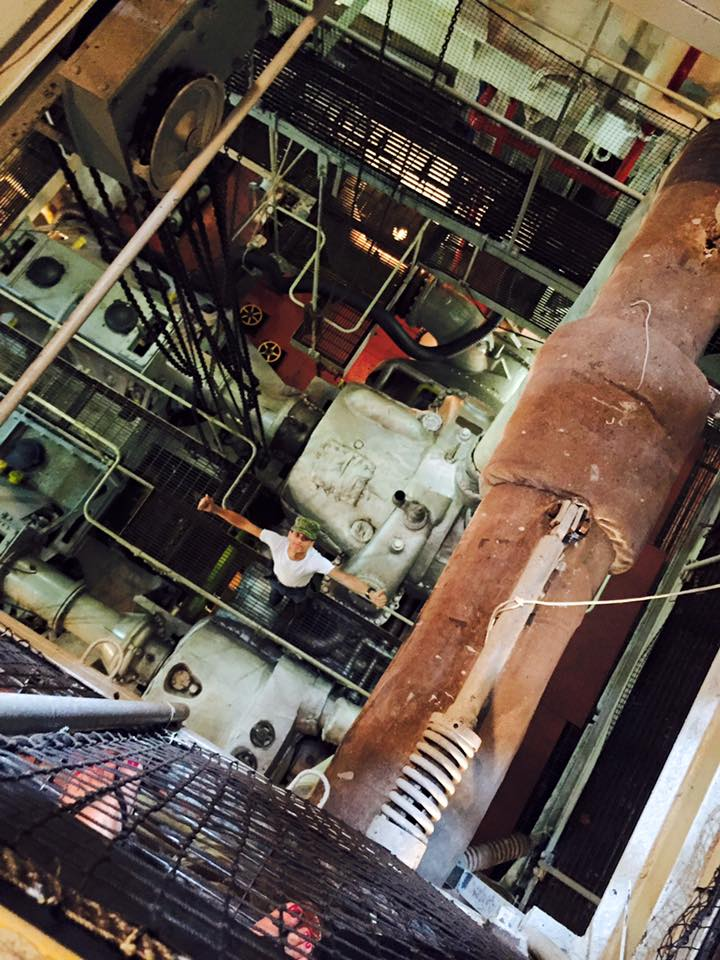
Looking down on the engine room of a Boulder Victory–class cargo ship

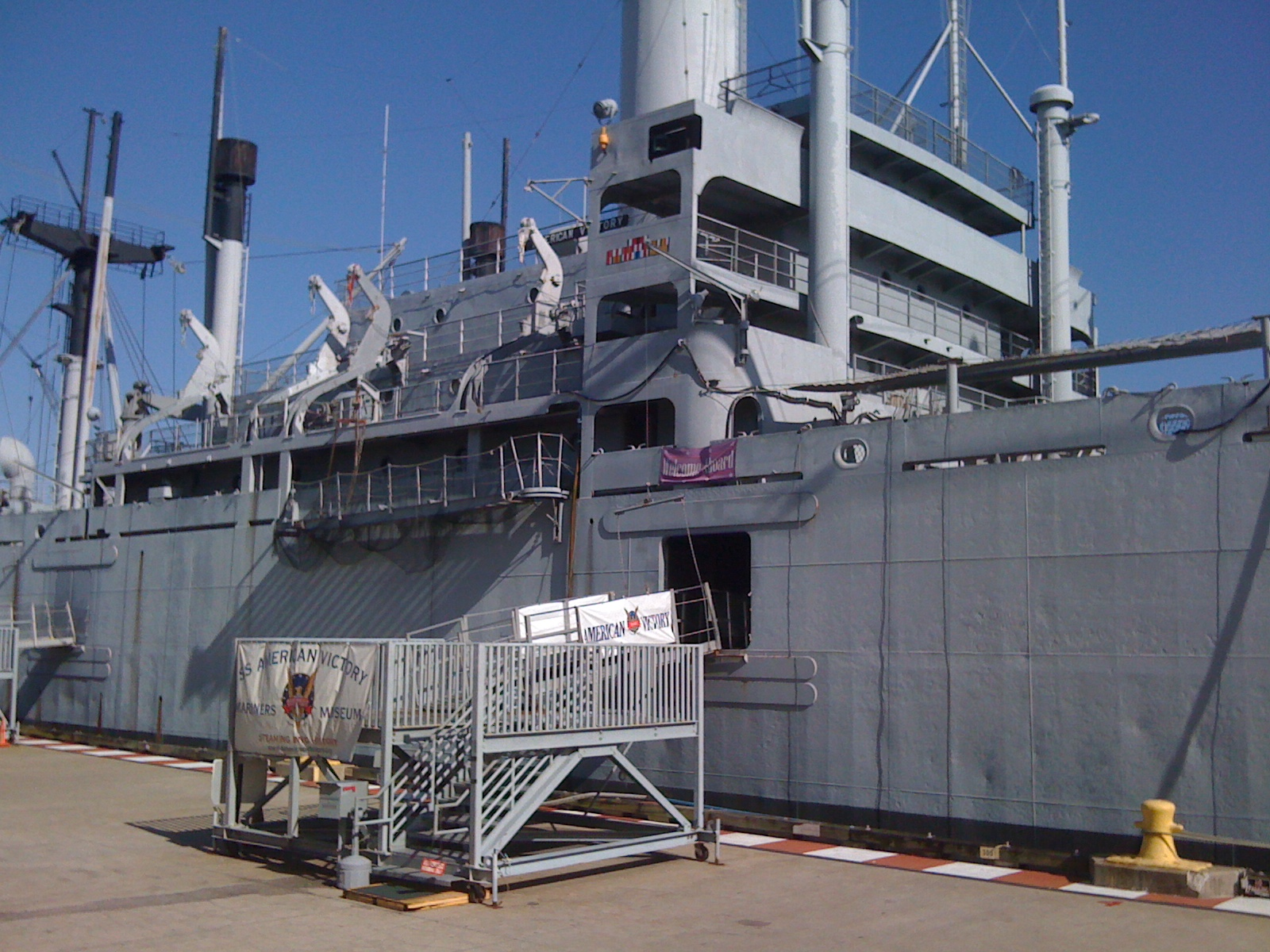
Victory ship Starboard side

== See also ==
- Empire ships
- List of auxiliaries of the United States Navy
- List of Victory ships
- T2 tanker
- Type C1 ship
- Type C2 ship
- Type C3 ship
