= USNS Private Joe P. Martinez =

Cargo ship of the United States Navy

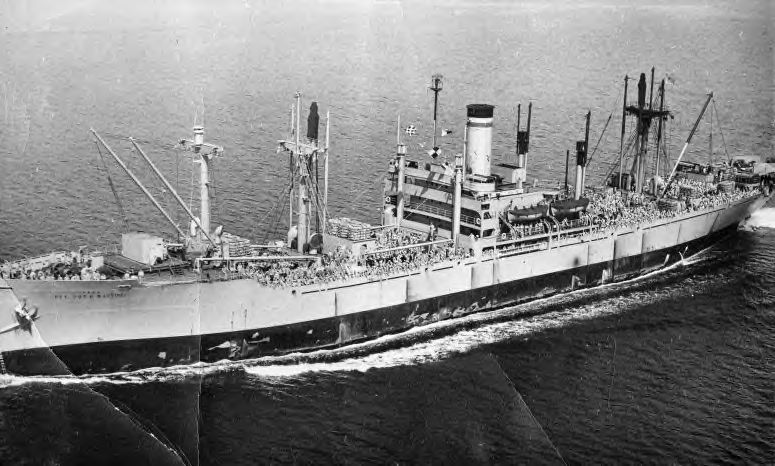
- USNS Private Joe P. Martinez (T-AP-187) arriving in Seattle, WA., 27 Dec 1951 with Korean War veterans.

History

United States
- Name: Stevens Victory; Private Joe P. Martinez
- Namesake: Stevens Institute of Technology; Joe P. Martinez awarded the Medal of Honor
- Ordered: as type (VC2-S-AP2) hull, MCV hull 825
- Builder: Bethlehem-Fairfield Shipyard, Inc., Baltimore, Maryland
- Laid down: 13 April 1945, as SS Stevens Victory
- Launched: 29 May 1945
- Sponsored by: Mrs. Harvey N. Davis
- Completed: 25 June 1945
- Acquired: 5 September 1946, by the U.S. Army
- Commissioned: 3 October 1947, as USAT Private Joe P. Martinez
- Decommissioned: 1 March 1950
- In service: 1 March 1950, as USNS Private Joe P. Martinez (T-AP-187)
- Out of service: 1 September 1952
- Stricken: 6 November 1952
- Identification: Hull symbol:T-AP-187
- Honors and awards: four battle stars for Korean War service
- Fate: Scrapped in 1971

General characteristics
- Class & type: Boulder Victory-class cargo ship
- Displacement: 4,480 long tons (4,550 t) (standard); 15,580 long tons (15,830 t) (full load)
- Length: 455 ft (139 m)
- Beam: 62 ft (19 m)
- Draft: 29 ft 2 in (8.89 m)
- Installed power: 8,500 shp (6,300 kW)
- Propulsion: 1 × cross compound steam turbine; 1 × shaft
- Speed: 15.5 kn (17.8 mph; 28.7 km/h)
- Troops: 1,259
- Complement: 96 officers and enlisted
- Armament: none

USNS Private Joe P. Martinez (T-AP-187) was a Boulder Victory-class cargo ship built for the United States Navy during the closing period of World War II. The ship was named after Private Joe P. Martinez, a Medal of Honor recipient.

== Career ==
The ship was laid down as Victory Ship SS Stevens Victory on 13 April 1945 and delivered to the United States Maritime Commission on 25 June 1945 for conversion to a troop ship. As Stevens Victory, the ship was operated by Grace Lines out of New York City in the Atlantic sea lanes. Her ports of call included Boston and Newport, as well as Downs, Antwerp, Marseilles, Gibraltar, Bremerhaven, Le Havre, Liverpool, and Southampton.

The ship was transferred from the Maritime Commission to the US Army on 5 September 1946. She was renamed Private Joe P. Martinez on 3 October 1947 and operated by the Army Transportation Service.

Private Joe P. Martinez transferred to the Navy on 1 March 1950 at New York. With the outbreak of war in Korea in June, there was a great need for transport tonnage in the Pacific. Shifting to San Francisco, Private Joe P. Martinez steamed for Okinawa and Yokohama on 31 July 1950, returning to Seattle on 2 September.

She immediately took on troops and supplies and again steamed for the Western Pacific, operating out of Japanese, Okinawan, and Korean ports. Private Joe P. Martinez made three additional cruises to the Western Pacific, departing Korean waters for the last time on 5 January 1951. She was laid up 1 September 1952 at Olympia. She was transferred from the Navy to the Maritime Administration on 30 September 1952 and struck from the Navy List on 6 November. Into 1970 she was laid up at Olympia in the National Defense Reserve Fleet; her ultimate fate is unknown.

USS Private Joe P. Martinez received four battle stars for Korean service.
