= Gamman =

Gamman is a surname. Notable people with the surname include:

- Lorraine Gamman (born 1957), English design professor
- Louise Gamman (born 1983), English basketball player

== See also ==
- Gammans
- Hamman
