= Morris E. Crain =

- Born: October 7, 1924; Bandana, Kentucky, U.S.
- Died: March 13, 1945 (aged 20); Haguenau, France †
- Burial place: Mount Pleasant Church Cemetery, La Center, Kentucky
- Military career
- Allegiance: United States
- Branch: United States Army
- Service years: 1943–1945
- Rank: Technical Sergeant
- Units: 141st Infantry Regiment, 36th Infantry Division
- Conflicts: World War II
- Awards: Medal of Honor

Morris E. Crain (October 7, 1924 – March 13, 1945) was a United States Army soldier and a recipient of the United States military's highest decoration—the Medal of Honor—for his actions in World War II.

== Biography ==
Crain joined the Army from Paducah, Kentucky in March 1943, and by March 13, 1945, was serving as a technical sergeant in Company E, 141st Infantry Regiment, 36th Infantry Division. On that day, he led his platoon during urban combat against a German force in Haguenau, France. He repeatedly braved hostile fire to lead and encourage his men, procure ammunition, and carry messages. When a house defended by some of his men came under intense attack from German soldiers and a tank, he ordered the men to withdraw while he held the position alone. He was killed when the house was destroyed by German fire. For these actions, he was posthumously awarded the Medal of Honor a year later, on February 13, 1946.

Crain, aged 20 at his death, was buried in Mount Pleasant Church, La Center, Kentucky.

== Medal of Honor citation ==
Technical Sergeant Crain's official Medal of Honor citation reads:

He led his platoon against powerful German forces during the struggle to enlarge the bridgehead across the Moder River. With great daring and aggressiveness he spearheaded the platoon in killing 10 enemy soldiers, capturing 12 more and securing its objective near an important road junction. Although heavy concentrations of artillery, mortar, and self-propelled gunfire raked the area, he moved about among his men during the day, exhorting them to great efforts and encouraging them to stand firm. He carried ammunition and maintained contact with the company command post, exposing himself to deadly enemy fire. At nightfall the enemy barrage became more intense and tanks entered the fray to cover foot troops while they bombarded our positions with grenades and rockets. As buildings were blasted by the Germans, the Americans fell back from house to house. T/Sgt. Crain deployed another platoon which had been sent to his support and then rushed through murderous tank and small-arms fire to the foremost house, which was being defended by 5 of his men. With the enemy attacking from an adjoining room and a tank firing pointblank at the house, he ordered the men to withdraw while he remained in the face of almost certain death to hold the position. Although shells were crashing through the walls and bullets were hitting all around him, he held his ground and with accurate fire from his submachinegun killed 3 Germans. He was killed when the building was destroyed by the enemy. T/Sgt. Crain's outstanding valor and intrepid leadership enabled his platoon to organize a new defense, repel the attack and preserve the hard-won bridgehead.

== Honored in ship naming ==
The USAT Morris E. Crain, a United States Army ship which served at the end of World War II, was named in his honor.

== See also ==
- List of Medal of Honor recipients
- List of Medal of Honor recipients for World War II
