= USNS Lt. George W. G. Boyce =

Cargo ship of the United States Navy

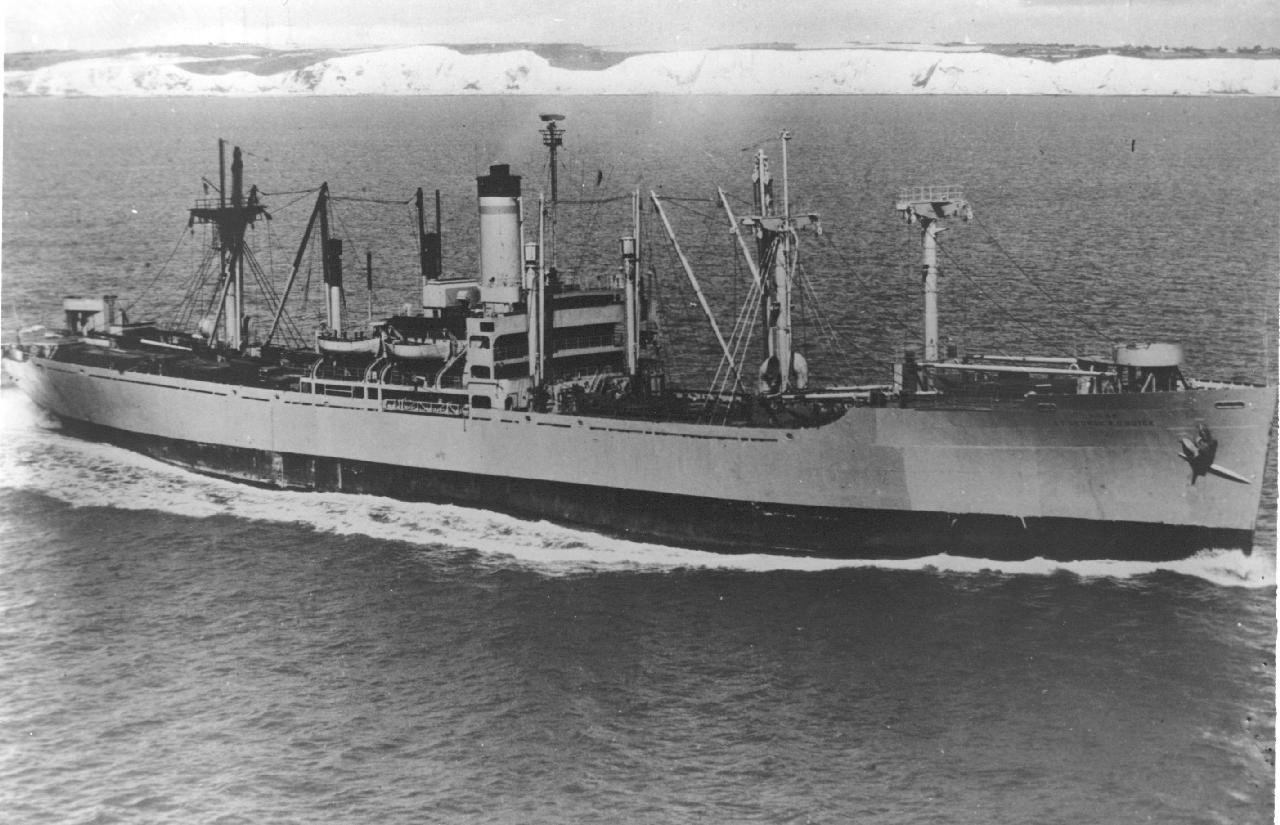
- USNS Lt. George W. G. Boyce (T-AK-251) underway.

History

United States
- Name: Waterville Victory; Lt. George W. G. Boyce
- Namesake: Ten cities in as many States in the United States have the name Waterville; Lt. George W. G. Boyce, awarded the Medal of Honor
- Ordered: as type (VC2-S-AP2) hull, MCV hull 852
- Builder: Bethlehem-Fairfield Shipyard, Inc., Baltimore, Maryland
- Laid down: 13 July 1945, as SS Waterville Victory
- Launched: 19 September 1945
- Sponsored by: Mrs. Christine M. Roundy
- Completed: 15 October 1945
- Commissioned: 1946, as USAT Lt. George W. G. Boyce
- Decommissioned: February 1950
- In service: 9 August 1950, as USNS Lt. George W. G. Boyce (T-AK-251)
- Out of service: 15 July 1973
- Stricken: 15 July 1973
- Identification: Hull symbol:T-AK-251
- Honors and awards: four battle stars for service during the Korean War
- Fate: Sold for scrapping, 1 October 1974 at Portland, OR.

General characteristics
- Class & type: Boulder Victory-class cargo ship
- Displacement: 4,480 long tons (4,550 t) (standard); 15,580 long tons (15,830 t) (full load)
- Length: 455 ft (139 m)
- Beam: 62 ft (19 m)
- Draft: 29 ft 2 in (8.89 m)
- Installed power: 8,500 shp (6,300 kW)
- Propulsion: 1 × cross compound steam turbine; 1 × shaft
- Speed: 15.5 kn (17.8 mph; 28.7 km/h)
- Complement: 49 officers and enlisted
- Armament: none

USNS Lt. George W. G. Boyce (T-AK-251) was a Boulder Victory-class cargo ship built for the U.S. Maritime Commission during the final months of World War II.

She was acquired by the U.S. Army in 1946 as USAT Lt. George W. G. Boyce and served the Army until 1950 when she was acquired by the United States Navy during the start of the Korean War. After serving the Navy during the war and earning four battle stars, she continued serving the Navy's needs until 1973 when she was struck and subsequently scrapped.

== Victory built in Maryland ==
Lt. George W. G. Boyce (T AK 251) was laid down as Waterville Victory under Maritime Commission contract by Bethlehem Fairfield Shipyard, Inc., Baltimore, Maryland, 13 July 1945; launched 19 September 1945; sponsored by Mrs. Christine M. Roundy; and delivered to her operator, Parry Navigation Company, Baltimore, Maryland, 15 October 1945 as a World War II United States Merchant Navy ship.

== U.S. Army service ==
Waterville Victory operated under the control of the War Shipping Administration until July 1946 when she was transferred to the Army Transportation Service and renamed USAT Lt. George W. G. Boyce. She was inactivated in February 1950 and entered the Maritime Commission Reserve Fleet at Olympia, Washington.

== U.S. Navy service ==
=== Korean War service ===
Following the Communist invasion of South Korea in June 1950, Lt. George W. G. Boyce underwent reactivation. She was acquired by the Navy from the Maritime Commission on 9 August and assigned to the Military Sea Transportation Service (MSTS).

Crewed by civilians, she departed Seattle, Washington, 29 September and steamed to the Far East with military cargo. During much of the period in the Korean War, she bolstered the seaborne supply line between the United States and the Far East carrying supplies to ports in Japan, South Korea, Formosa, and Okinawa. In addition she supplied American bases in the Aleutian Islands.

=== Post-Korean War service ===
On 25 January 1954 Lt. George W. G. Boyce departed Bangor, Washington, for MSTS duty in the Atlantic Ocean. She steamed via San Juan, Puerto Rico, to ports in West Germany and France, thence returned to New York City 30 March. During May and June she expanded her scope of operations to include ports in the Mediterranean.

Over the next 6 years she maintained a busy, wide-ranging schedule of supply runs in support of the defense of the United States and the free world. In addition to numerous transatlantic voyages to ports in western Europe, she operated from Greenland to the troubled Middle East. In August and September 1957 and again in 1958 she made logistics runs to the Red Sea and the Indian Ocean. And she operated in the eastern Mediterranean during the summer of 1958 following American peacekeeping operations in troubled Lebanon.

Departing New York 14 January 1960, Lt. George W. C. Boyce sailed on a 6-month, round the world deployment which sent her via the Mediterranean and the Indian Ocean to ports in South Vietnam, Formosa, South Korea, Japan, and the Philippine Islands. Thence, after touching American bases in the Mariana Islands and the Marshall Islands, she returned to the U.S. East Coast 29 June and resumed transatlantic service. The veteran cargo ship made a second run to the Far East and back later that year, and from 22 April to 31 August 1961 she circumnavigated the earth for the second time in little more than a year.

During the next 2 years she cruised primarily to the Mediterranean and Europe with additional assignments sending her to the Caribbean and to the Pacific coast of the United States. From September 1963 to February 1964, she steamed via the west coast to the Far East and back to supply American forces in that unsettled area. She resumed transatlantic runs in April and In December deployed once again to the Far East.

=== Vietnam support ===
From 1964 Lt. George W. G. Boyce alternated supply runs to European and Middle Eastern ports with logistics deployments in support of America's growing commitment in South Vietnam. This role continued into 1969.

== Post-war decommissioning and career ==
The vessel was placed out of service on 15 July 1973 and struck from the Navy List on the same day. She was placed in the reserve fleet, and, on 1 October 1974, sold for scrapping in Portland, Oregon.

== Honors and awards ==
Lt. George W. G. Boyce received four battle stars for service during the Korean War:

First UN Counter Offensive - 5 to 21 April 1951
Communist China Spring Offensive - 22 April to 5 May 1951 - 4 to 11 October 1951
First UN Summer-Fall - 4 to 11 October 1951 - 15 December 1951 to 3 January 1952 - 14 to 21 February 1952 - 8 to 29 April 1952
Second Korean Winter - 15 December to 3 January 1952 - 23 to 29 April 1952

Qualified personnel were authorized the following:

National Defense Service Medal (2)
Korean Service Medal (4)
Vietnam Service Medal (1)
United Nations Service Medal
Republic of Vietnam Campaign Medal
Republic of Korea War Service Medal (retroactive)
