= Gammons =

Gammons is a surname. Notable people with the surname include:

- J. A. Gammons (1876–1963), American baseball and football player and coach
- Peter Gammons (born 1945), American sportswriter, media personality, and musician

== See also ==
- Gammans
- Hammons
