= Archer T. Gammon =

United States Army Medal of Honor recipient

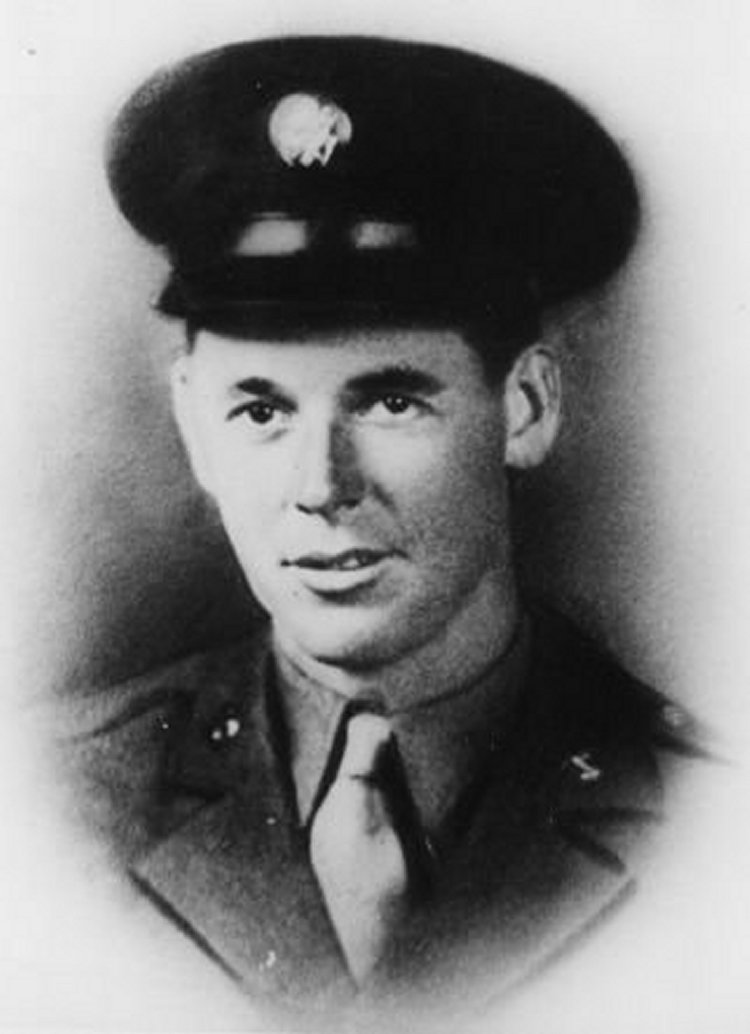
- Archer T. Gammon, Medal of Honor recipient
- Born: September 11, 1918; Chatham, Virginia, U.S.
- Died: January 11, 1945 (aged 26) near Bastogne, Belgium
- Burial place: Mountain View Cemetery, Danville, Virginia
- Military career
- Allegiance: United States of America
- Branch: United States Army
- Service years: 1942 - 1945
- Rank: Staff Sergeant
- Units: 9th Armored Infantry Battalion, 6th Armored Division
- Conflicts: World War II
- Awards: Medal of Honor; Purple Heart

Archer T. Gammon (September 11, 1918 – January 11, 1945) was a United States Army soldier and a recipient of the United States military's highest decoration—the Medal of Honor—for his actions in World War II.

Gammon joined the Army from Roanoke, Virginia, in March 1942, and by January 11, 1945, was serving as a staff sergeant in Company A, 9th Armored Infantry Battalion, 6th Armored Division. On that day, near Bastogne, Belgium, he destroyed a German machine gun position before beginning a one-man assault on a Tiger Royal tank. He silenced a supporting machine gun emplacement and killed two infantrymen before he was killed by a shot from the tank. For these actions, he was posthumously awarded the Medal of Honor a year later, on February 13, 1946.

Gammon, aged 26 at his death, was buried in Mountain View Cemetery, Danville, Virginia.

== Medal of Honor citation ==
Staff Sergeant Gammon's official Medal of Honor citation reads from, https://www.cmohs.org/recipients/archer-t-gammon:

He charged 30 yards through hip-deep snow to knock out a machinegun and its 3-man crew with grenades, saving his platoon from being decimated and allowing it to continue its advance from an open field into some nearby woods. The platoon's advance through the woods had only begun when a machinegun supported by riflemen opened fire and a Tiger Royal tank sent 88mm. shells screaming at the unit from the left flank. S/Sgt. Gammon, disregarding all thoughts of personal safety, rushed forward, then cut to the left, crossing the width of the platoon's skirmish line in an attempt to get within grenade range of the tank and its protecting foot troops. Intense fire was concentrated on him by riflemen and the machinegun emplaced near the tank. He charged the automatic weapon, wiped out its crew of 4 with grenades, and, with supreme daring, advanced to within 25 yards of the armored vehicle, killing 2 hostile infantrymen with rifle fire as he moved forward. The tank had started to withdraw, backing a short distance, then firing, backing some more, and then stopping to blast out another round, when the man whose single-handed relentless attack had put the ponderous machine on the defensive was struck and instantly killed by a direct hit from the Tiger Royal's heavy gun. By his intrepidity and extreme devotion to the task of driving the enemy back no matter what the odds, S/Sgt. Gammon cleared the woods of German forces, for the tank continued to withdraw, leaving open the path for the gallant squad leader's platoon.

== Badges ==
Badge	Combat Infantryman Badge		
1st row	Medal of Honor		
2nd row	Bronze Star Medal	Purple Heart	Army Good Conduct Medal
3rd row	American Campaign Medal	European–African–Middle Eastern Campaign Medal with 1 campaign star	World War II Victory Medal

== Honored in ship naming ==
The USAT Sgt. Archer T. Gammon which served the United States Army at the end of World War II was named in his honor.

== See also ==
- List of Medal of Honor recipients for World War II
