= James Gammon (engraver) =

English engraver of portraits

James Gammon (fl. 1660–1670), was an English engraver of portraits.

Gammon's works were for the most part copies of better known engravings. Joseph Strutt described his works as being executed "in a stiff, tasteless style".

He lived in London, and was employed mainly by booksellers. Among his engravings were portraits of James I, Charles I, Charles II, Catherine of Braganza, James, duke of York, Henry, duke of Gloucester, Mary, princess of Orange, the Duke and Duchess of Monmouth, Richard Cromwell, George Monck, Duke of Albemarle (a copy from Loggan's print), Sir Tobias Mathew (prefixed to his Letters, 1660), Edward Mascall the painter, and others.

A portrait of Ann, duchess of Albemarle, was "sold by" a Richard Gammon "against Exeter House in ye Strand", probably a relative of James. The engraving can be seen on the National Portrait Gallery webpages. Another Gammon in the story is Leonard Gammon whose engraving by William Faithorne appears on the National Portrait Gallery webpages. Leonard Gammon possibly also a relation of James. Leonard Gammon was the Clerk of the Works at Greenwich. Leonard's father was almost certainly Richard Gammon who was married to Elizabeth Jones, kinswoman of Inigo Jones. The Richard Gammon of the "sold by" reference is probably a younger brother of Leonard.
