= Hammons =

Hammons is a surname. Notable people with the surname include:

- David Hammons (born 1943), American artist
- David Hammons (Maine politician) (1808–1888), American politician
- Debbie Hammons (born 1950), American politician
- E. W. Hammons (1882–1962), American film producer
- Edden Hammons (1876–1955), American fiddler
- Foy Hammons (1894–1961), American football player and coach
- John Tyler Hammons (born 1988), American politician
- Joseph Hammons (1787–1836), American politician
- Sophia Hammons (born 2006), American actress

== See also ==
- Hammon (disambiguation)
