= Roland Gammon =

Roland I. Gammon
- Born: November 17, 1915; Caribou, Maine
- Died: April 8, 1981 (aged 65)
- Occupations: writer publicist founder of World Authors, Ltd.
- Notable work: Truth Is One; The Story of the World's Great Living Religions in Pictures and Text; All Believers Are Brothers; Faith Is a Star; A God For Modern Man; Nirvana Now
- Parents: Charles C. Gammon (father); Helen Fern (mother)

Roland I. Gammon (November 17, 1915 – April 8, 1981) was an American writer, publicist, and founder of World Authors, Ltd.

== Early life ==
Roland Irvine Gammon was born on November 17, 1915, to Charles C. Gammon and Helen Fern (Irvine) Gammon in Caribou, Maine. Charles Gammon worked as a druggist in Caribou, but his ancestors had lived in Canada for multiple generations. Roland Gammon resided in Caribou until he entered Colby College about 1933 and after graduation continued his studies at Oxford University.

== Career in writing ==
By the time he joined the military during World War II he listed his occupation as writer. He served with the United States Air Corps, and after the war became a reporter for Time-Life. He married Jean Thompson in 1947 and was divorced in 1960. Jean was described as a "women's representative" for Scandinavian Airlines System (SAS) and wrote travel brochures under the name "Sally Ann Simpson."

== Religious writings ==
In 1954 he co-authored with Henry James Forman the book Truth Is One; The Story of the World's Great Living Religions in Pictures and Text.

In the 1960s and 1970s, Gammon devoted increasing amounts of time to writing, resulting in four more books on religion: All Believers Are Brothers, Faith Is a Star, A God For Modern Man. and Nirvana Now, Nirvana Now was seven years in preparation and was his final work.

== New York City ==
In the 1950s, Gammon was part of a publicity team in mid-town Manhattan, whose clients included Joseph P. Kennedy and his son, Senator John F. Kennedy. Gammon was president of Editorial Communications Inc. He was also past president of the Fourth Universalist Church in New York City and dean of its all-faith chapel. Notable contacts in Gammon's life as a writer included Walt Disney and Albert Schweitzer, the latter assisted by Gammon in preparing a statement of his philosophy just weeks before his death in 1965. Near the end of his life he founded World Authors Ltd.

== Philosophy of life ==
Gammon was clearly religious and had worked out his philosophy of life, as quoted in a newspaper article announcing his death.

Because in my view, there is no separation in death, I feel that death is a part of life and that life continues as the divine adventure. . . In reality, life and death are one [and but] different aspects of harmony and happiness.

Gammon reportedly collapsed and died on April 8, 1981, near his residence in Manhattan. He was 65.
