= Permanente Metals =

- Industry: Metal refining
- Headquarters: Richmond, California, United States

Permanente Metals Corporation (PMC) is best known for having managed the Richmond Shipyards in Richmond, California, owned by one of industrialist Henry J. Kaiser's many corporations, and also engaged in related corporate activities. These four of the seven west coast Kaiser Shipyards were known for their construction of Liberty ships and later Victory ships.

== History ==
The company was formed on 9 December 1940 as the Todd California Shipbuilding Corporation. The name was changed to Permanente Metals Corp. on 8 November 1941. In February 1942, the Todd Corporation acquired Kaiser's interests in the Seattle-Tacoma Shipbuilding Corporation and Kaiser acquired Todd's interests in Permanente Metals. The seven-way shipyard in Richmond that was built to fulfill a contract for 30 Ocean ships was complete by August 1941 and Permanente Metals completed the contract for the ships.

The company was originally a major producer of magnesium during World War II and derives its name from the Permanente Creek in Santa Clara County, California where mining operations commenced in the early 1930s. To make use of its major product, powdered magnesium, PMC also developed and supplied an incendiary bomb mixture of magnesium powder, asphalt, gasoline, and other components (known as "goop," with similar characteristics to napalm); 17,000 short tons of goop-filled bombs were used in World War II (approximately eight percent of the total tonnage of incendiaries that were dropped during that conflict). Permanente ranked 42nd among United States corporations in the value of World War II military production contracts.

After the war, Kaiser went into the aluminum business, starting out with war surplus plants in Washington State and Louisiana. In 1949, the company name was changed. Permanente Metals was henceforth the Kaiser Aluminum & Chemicals Corporation.
