= List of Victory ships (M) =

This is a list of Victory ships with names beginning with M.

== Description ==
A Victory ship was a cargo ship. The cargo ships were 455 feet 3 inches (138.76 m) overall, 436 feet 6 inches (133.05 m) between perpendiculars They had a beam of 62 feet 0 inches (18.90 m), a depth of 38 feet 0 inches (11.58 m) and a draught of 28 feet 0 inches (8.53 m). They were assessed at 7,612 GRT, 4,555 NRT and 10,750 DWT.

The ships were powered by a triple expansion steam engine, driving a steam turbine via double reduction gear. This gave the ship a speed of 15.5 knots (28.7 km/h) or 16.5 knots (30.6 km/h), depending on the machinery installed.

Liberty ships had five holds. No. 1 hold was 57 feet 6 inches (17.53 m) long, with a capacity of 81,715 cubic feet (2,313.9 m^{3}), No. 2 hold was 45 feet 0 inches (13.72 m) long, with a capacity of 89,370 cubic feet (2,531 m^{3}), No. 3 hold was 78 feet 0 inches (23.77 m) long, with a capacity of 158,000 cubic feet (4,500 m^{3}), No. 4 hold was 81 feet 0 inches (24.69 m) long, with a capacity of 89,370 cubic feet (2,531 m^{3}) and No. 5 hold was 75 feet 0 inches (22.86 m) long, with a capacity of 81,575 cubic feet (2,309.9 m^{3}).

In wartime service, they carried a crew of 62, plus 28 gunners. The ships carried four lifeboats. Two were powered, with a capacity of 27 people and two were unpowered, with a capacity of 29 people.

== Macalester Victory ==
Macalester Victory was built by Oregon Shipbuilding Corporation, Portland, Oregon. Her keel was laid on 16 March 1945. She was launched on 28 April and delivered on 29 May. Built for the War Shipping Administration (WSA), she was operated under the management of Northland Transportation Company. Laid up at Wilmington, North Carolina in 1948. Later transferred to Mobile, Alabama. Sold in 1963 to Winco Tankers Inc., Wilmington, Delaware and renamed Windsor Victory. Sold in 1972 to Mercury Steamship Co., New York. A barge ran into her rudder and propeller at Saigon, Vietnam on 13 June 1972. On 18 March 1973, she experienced propeller shaft vibration whilst on a voyage from Houston, Texas to Saigon. It was found that the blades of her propeller were fractured. She arrived at Kaohsiung, Taiwan for scrapping in April 1973.

== MacMurray Victory ==
MacMurray Victory was built by Permanente Metals Corporation, Richmond, California. Her keel was laid on 22 March 1945. She was launched on 28 April and delivered on 30 June. Built for the WSA, she was operated under the management of American President Lines. Sold in 1946 to N.V. Nederlandsche Stoomvaarts Maatschappi Oceaan, Amsterdam, Netherlands and renamed Polyphemus. Sold in 1960 to Ocean Steamship Company, Liverpool, United Kingdom and renamed Tantalus. Operated under the management of Alfred Holt & Co. Sold in 1969 to Mecenas Compania Navigation S.A., Piraeus, Greece and renamed Pelops. She was scrapped at Kaohsiung in April 1970.

== Madawaska Victory ==
Madawaska Victory was a troop transport built by Bethlehem Fairfield Shipyard, Baltimore, Maryland. Her keel was laid on 29 June 1944. She was launched on 16 September and delivered on 20 October. Built for the WSA, she was operated under the management of A. H. Bull & Company. Laid up in the Hudson River in 1946. Sold in 1947 to Corporation Peruana de Vapores, Callao, Peru and renamed Amazonas. She was sold for scrapping in 1968. On 11 December, she sustained boiler damage and flooding whilst on a voyage from Callao to Kaohsiung and was towed in to Naha, Japan by a United States Army tug. She departed on 24 December but requested another tow on 27 December. She was subsequently towed in to Okinawa, Japan. On 4 March 1969, she was again in distress with boiler and engine problems. She was towed to Kaohsiung by the tug Mississippi. She was scrapped at Kaohsiung in May 1969.

== Madeia ==
Madeia was to have been built by Oregon Shipbuilding Corporation for the United States Navy. The order was cancelled on 14 August 1945.

== Magoffin ==
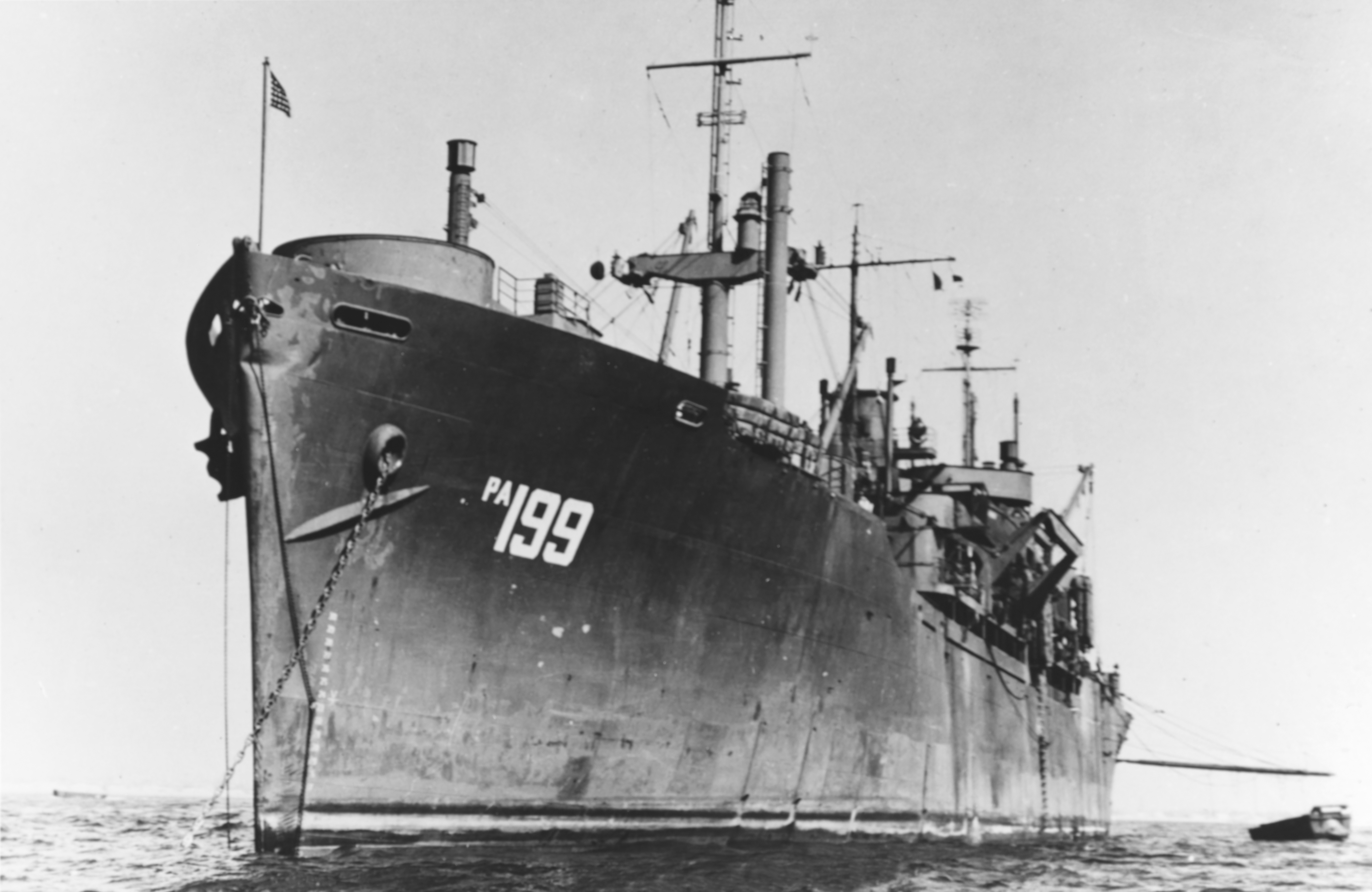
USS Magoffin

Magoffin was built by Kaiser Company, Vancouver, Washington. Her keel was laid on 20 June 1944. She was launched on 4 October and delivered on 25 October. Built for the United States Navy. She was decommissioned in 1946. Recommissioned in 1950 due to the Korean War. Laid up in Suisun Bay in 1969. She was scrapped in 1980.

== Mahanoy City Victory ==
Mahanoy City Victory was a troop transport built by Bethlehem Fairfield Shipyard. Her keel was laid on 5 January 1945. She was launched on 24 February and delivered on 26 March. Built for the WSA, she was operated under the management of North Atlantic & Gulf Steamship Company. Laid up in Suisun Bay in 1946. Sold in 1947 to Stanhope Steamship Company, London, United Kingdom and renamed Stanmore. Sold later that year to Peninsular & Oriental Steam Navigation Company, London and renamed Khyber. Sold in 1964 to Dragon Steamship Co., Liberia and renamed Comet Victory. Sold in 1968 to Republic Steamship Co., Liberia and renamed Ocean Comet. She suffered a boiler explosion on 12 August 1969 whilst on a voyage from Puerto Somoza, Nicaragua to Balboa, Panama. She put in to Galveston, Texas, United States. Cracks in her hull were discovered on 19 September at Santos She put in to Durban, South Africa due to engine problems on 10 November whilst on a voyage from Recife, Brazil to Saigon. She subsequently resumed her voyage. She was scrapped at Kaohsiung in January 1970.

== Malden Victory ==
Malden Victory was built by Bethlehem Fairfield Shipyard. Her keel was laid on 16 August 1944. She was launched on 22 October and delivered on 22 November. Built for the WSA, she was operated under the management of American Export Line. Laid up at Mobile in 1949. Later transferred to Suisun Bay. She was scrapped in China in 1993.

== Mandan Victory ==
Mandan Victory was built by Oregon Shipbuilding Corporation. Her keel was laid on 15 April 1944. She was launched on 26 May and delivered on 19 June. Built for the WSA, she was operated under the management of Isthmian Steamship Company. She was chartered to Waterman Steamship Company. Laid up at Wilmington, North Carolina in 1947. To the United States Army Transportation Corps in 1948 and renamed Sgt. Jack J. Pendleton. To the United States Navy in 1950. Operated by the Military Sea Transportation Service. She ran aground off Triton Island, Japan on 25 September 1973 and was declared a constructive total loss. She was scrapped in 1974.

== Manderson Victory ==
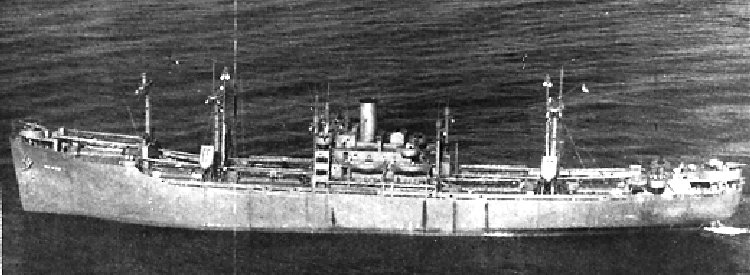
USS Manderson Victory

Manderson Victory was built by Permanente Metals Corporation. Her keel was laid on 4 July 1944. She was launched on 23 September and delivered on 3 November. Built for the United States Navy. To the United States Maritime Commission (USMC) in 1946. Laid up in the Hudson River. Recommissioned in 1950 due to the Korean War. Laid up in the James River in 1953. Returned to service in 1966 due to the Vietnam War. Operated under the management of Farrell Lines. Laid up in the James River in 1973. She was scrapped at Alang, India in 1993.

== Mankato Victory ==
Mankato Victory was built by Oregon Shipbuilding Corporation. Her keel was laid on 5 July 1945. She was launched on 29 August and delivered on 14 November. Built for the WSA, she was operated under the management of American Mail Line. Sold in 1949 to Victory Carriers Inc. She was scrapped in Kaohsiung in 1973.

== Marathon ==
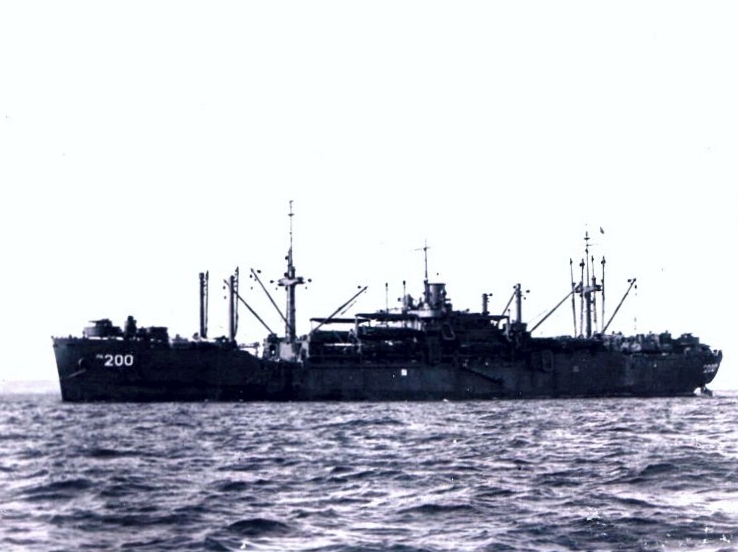
USS Marathon

Marathon was built by Kaiser Company. Her keel was laid on 4 July 1944. She was launched on 7 October and delivered on 27 October. Built for the United States Navy. To the USMC in 1946 and laid up in Suisun Bay. She was scrapped in the United States in 1975.

== Maricopa ==
Maricopa was to have been built by Oregon Shipbuilding Corporation for the United States Navy. The order was cancelled on 14 August 1945.

== Maritime Victory ==
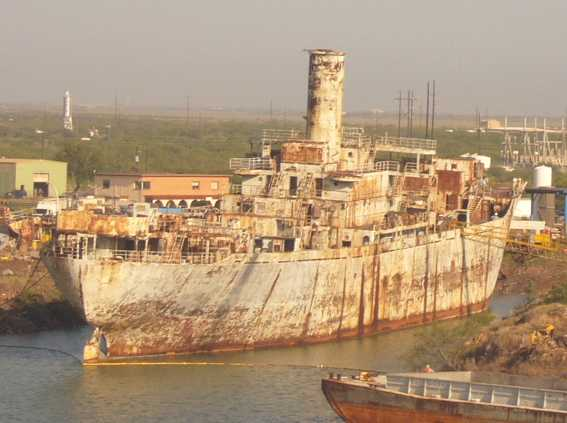
Maritime Victory

Maritime Victory was a troop transport built by Bethlehem Fairfield Shipyard. Her keel was laid on 7 April 1945. She was launched on 22 May and delivered on 18 June. Built for the WSA, she was operated under the management of American South African Line. To the United States Army Transportation Corps in 1947 and renamed Pvt. Frederick E. Murphy. To the United States Department of Commerce in 1950. Laid up at Beaumont, Texas. She was scrapped at Brownsville, Texas in 2007.

== Marquette Victory ==
Marquette Victory was built by Permanente Metals Corporation. Her keel was laid on 29 March 1945. She was launched on 9 May and delivered on 2 June. Built for the WSA, she was operated under the management of Hammond Shipping Company. Laid up at Beaumont in 1950. Later transferred to Olympia, Washington. Sold to shipbreakers in Portland, Oregon in February 1972. Resold, she was converted to a non-propelled fish processing ship at Tacoma, Washington in April 1972.

== Marshall Victory ==
Marshall Victory was built by Bethlehem Fairfield Shipyard. Her keel was laid on 4 April 1945. She was launched on 21 May and delivered on 15 June. Built for the WSA, she was operated under the management of J. H. Winchester & Company. To the United States Army Transportation Corps in 1947 and renamed Lt. Raymond O. Baudoin. To the United States Department of Commerce in 1949, laid up in Suisun Bay. To the United States Navy in 1950. Operated by the Military Sea Transportation Service. To the United States Department of Commerce in 1952. Laid up at Olympia. She was scrapped at San Chong City, Taiwan in February 1972.

== Marshfield Victory ==
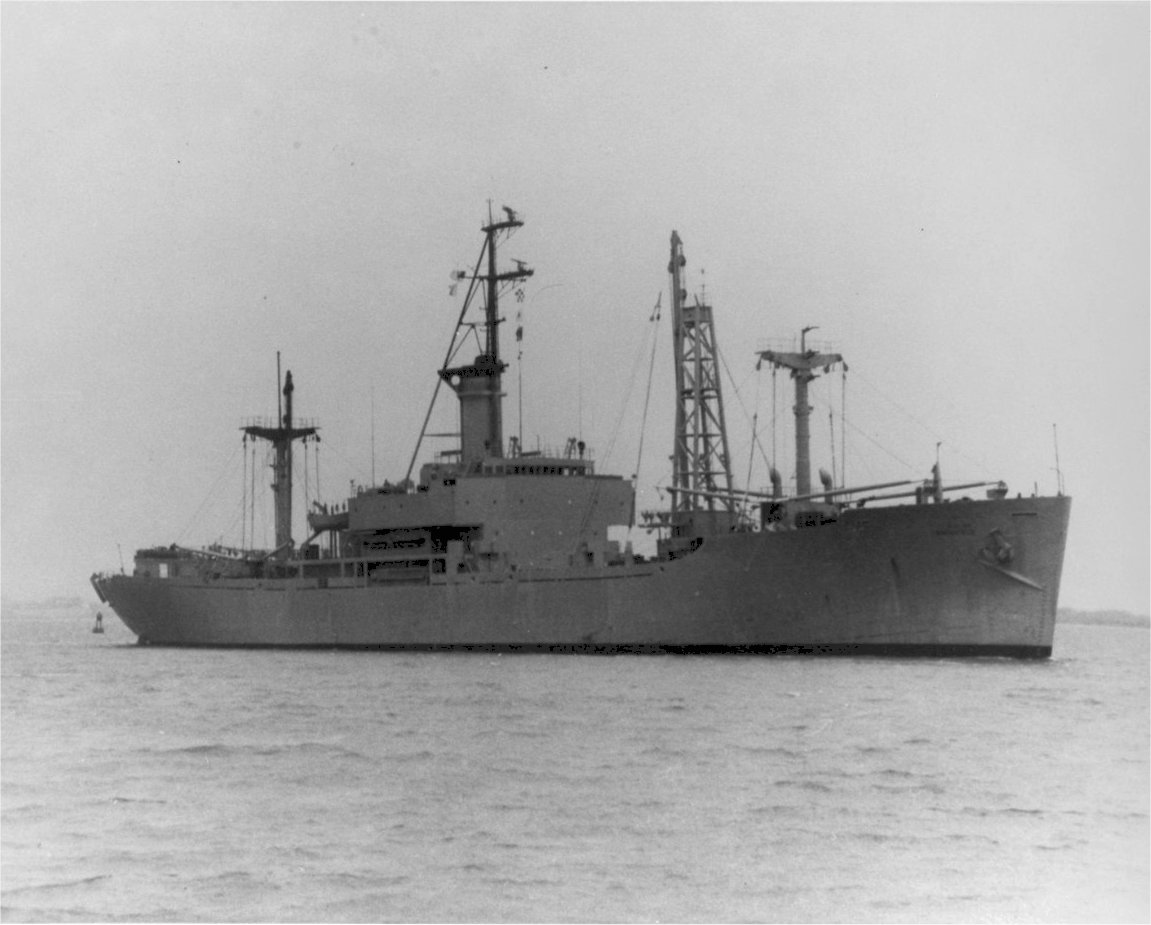
USNS Marshfield

Marshfield Victory was built by Oregon Shipbuilding Corporation. Her keel was laid on 1 April 1944. She was launched on 15 May and delivered on 7 June. Built for the WSA, she was operated under the management of American Mail Line. Laid up in the James River in 1953. To the United States Navy in 1968 and renamed Marshfield. Operated by the Military Sea Transportation Service. To the United States Maritime Administration in 1992. Laid up in the James River. She was scrapped at Chesapeake, Virginia in 2006.

== Marvin H. McIntyre ==
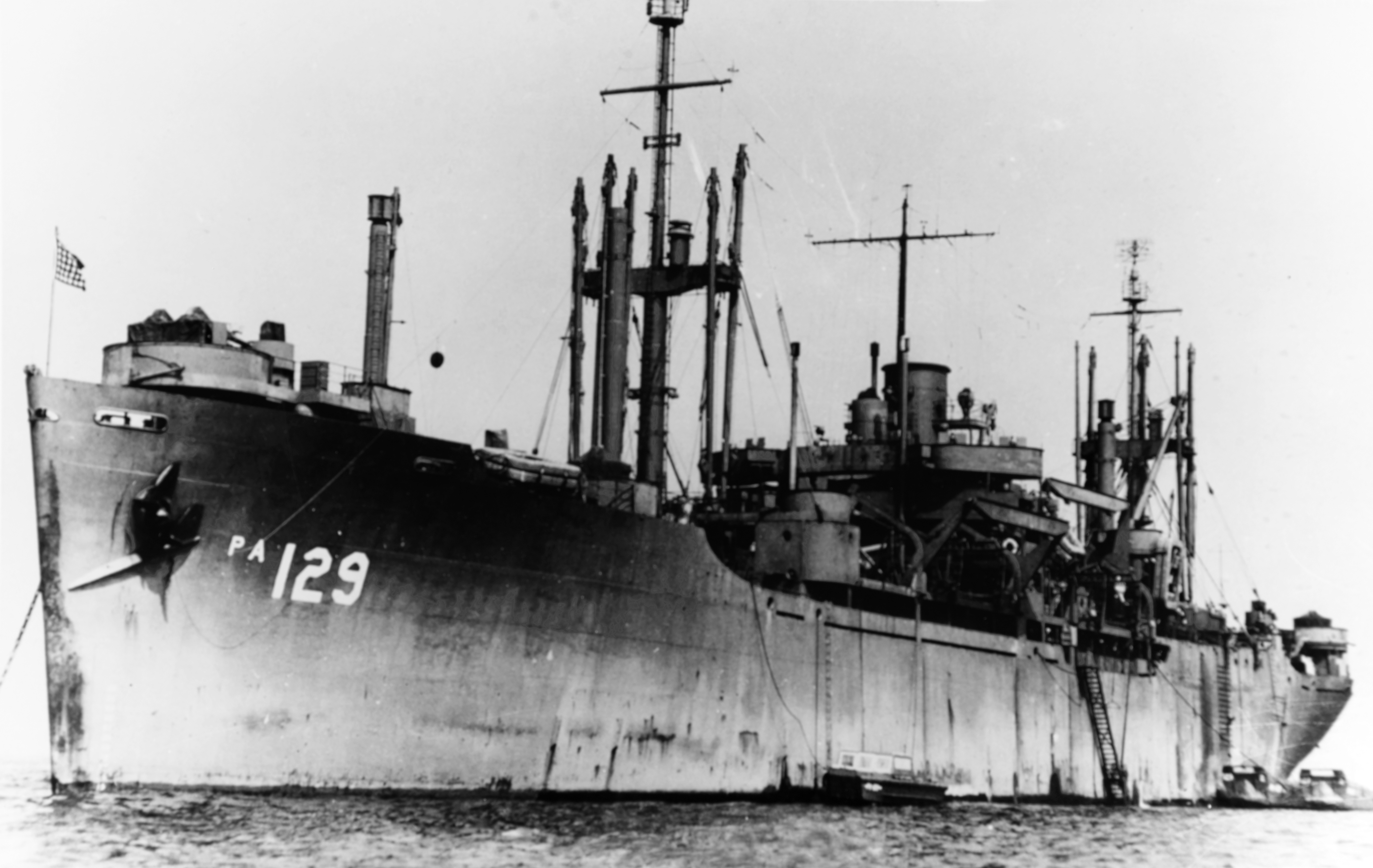
USS Marvin H. McIntyre

Marvin H. McIntyre was built by California Shipbuilding Corporation, Terminal Island, Los Angeles, California. Her keel was laid down as Arlington on 25 May 1944. She was launched on 21 September and delivered as Marvin H. McIntyre on 18 August. Built for the United States Navy. To the USMC in 1946. Laid up in the James River. She was sold to New York shipbreakers in April 1973.

== Maryville Victory ==
Maryville Victory was a troop transport built by California Shipbuilding Corporation. Her keel was laid on 28 December 1944. She was launched on 22 February 1945 and delivered on 19 March. Built for the WSA, she was operated under the management of McCormick Steamship Co. Laid up in the James River in 1946. She was sold to Unisphere Tankers Corp., Los Angeles in 1967 and renamed Oceanic Victory. Sold in 1968 to Chatham Shipping Copr., Los Angeles. Sold in 1969 to Resolute Marine Associates, Los Angeles. Sold at auction in September 1969 by United States Marshals Service. Buyers were Windjammer Shipping Inc., Wilmington, Delaware. Renamed Windjammer Polly. Sold in 1970 to Transworld Shipping Ltd., Panama and renamed Pernod. Detained at Singapore in 1971. Sold by auction in April 1971 on orders of the Supreme Court of Singapore. She departed under tow on 1 July and was scrapped at Kaohsiung in September 1971.

== Massilon Victory ==
Massilon Victory was built by Permanente Metals Corporation. Her keel was laid on 19 October 1944. She was launched on 16 December and delivered on 23 January 1945. Built for the WSA, she was operated under the management of American President Lines. Laid up in the Hudson River in 1946. Returned to service in 1950 due to the Korean War. Laid up in the James River in 1953. Later transferred to Suisun Bay. She was scrapped in China in 1994.

== Mayfield Victory ==
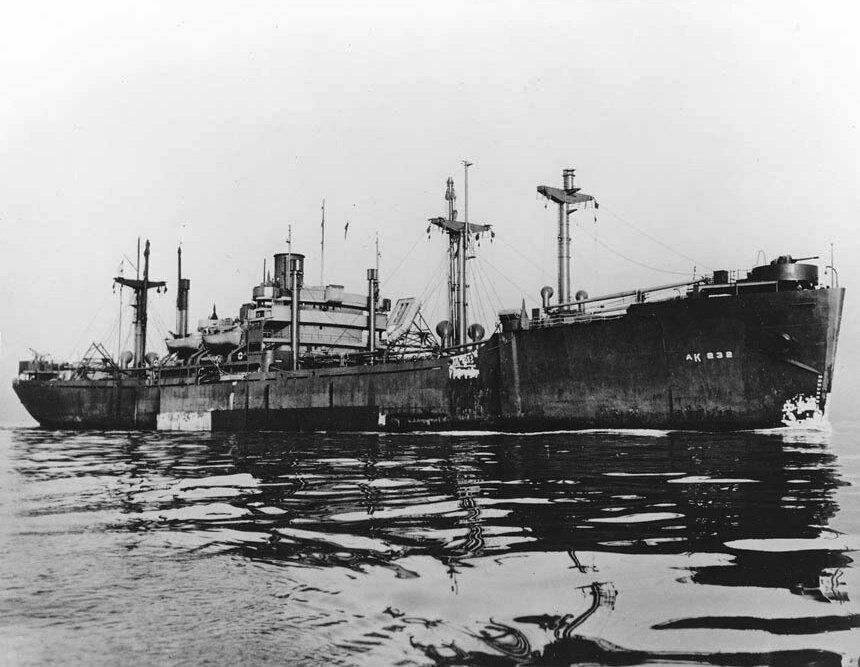
USS Mayfield Victory

Mayfield Victory was built by Permanente Metals Corporation. Her keel was laid on 10 August 1944. She was launched on 10 October and delivered on 16 November. Built for the United States Navy. To the United States Maritime Commission in 1947. Laid up at Wilmington, North Carolina. Entered merchant service in 1966 due to the Vietnam War. Operated under the management of American Mail Line. Laid up in Suisun Bay in 1973. She was scrapped in China in 1994.

== McCracken ==
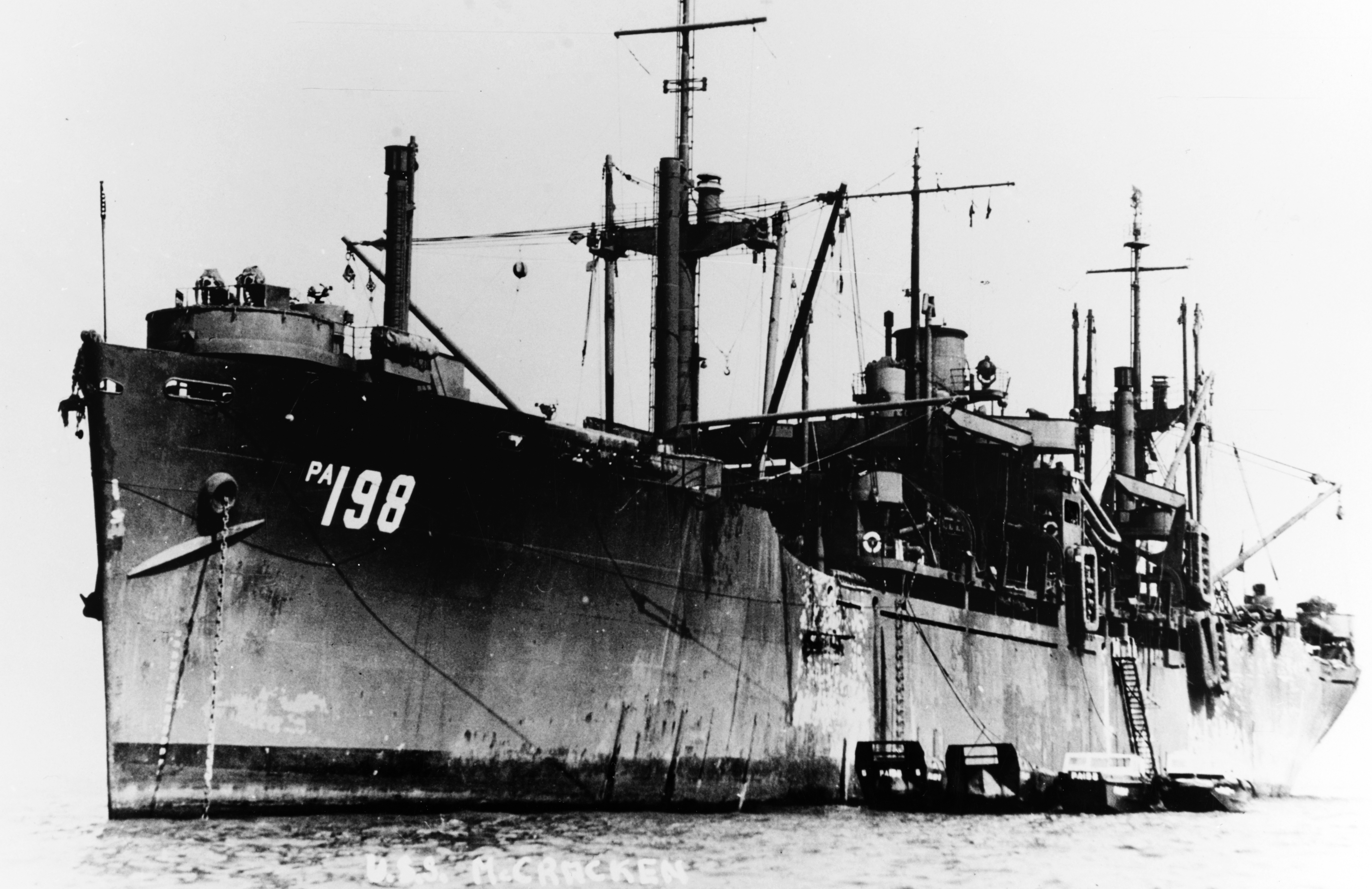
USS McCracken

USS McCracken was built by Kaiser Company. Her keel was laid on 8 June 1944. She was launched on 29 September and delivered on 21 October. Built for the United States Navy. Decommissioned in 1946. To the United States Maritime Administration in 1958. Laid up in Suisun Bay. She was scrapped in the United States in 1975.

== McLennan ==
McLennan was to have been built by Oregon Shipbuilding Corporation for the United States Navy. The order was cancelled on 14 August 1945.

== Mecklenburg ==
Mecklenburg was to have been built by Oregon Shipbuilding Corporation for the United States Navy. The order was cancelled on 14 August 1945.

== Medina Victory ==
Medina Victory was a troop carrier built by Permanente Metals Corporation. Her keel was laid on 22 December 1944. She was launched on 10 February 1945 and delivered on 7 March. Built for the WSA, she was operated under the management of Marine Transport Line. To the Ministry of Transport, London in June 1946. Operated under the management of Donaldson, Brothers & Black Ltd. Sold in September 1947 to Donaldson Atlantic Line Ltd. Converted to a cargo line by Barclay, Curle & Co. Ltd., Glasgow and renamed Laurentia. Converted to a passenger ship in 1948. To Donaldson Line in 1954. She arrived at Valencia, Spain for scrapping on 4 January 1967.

== Mellette ==
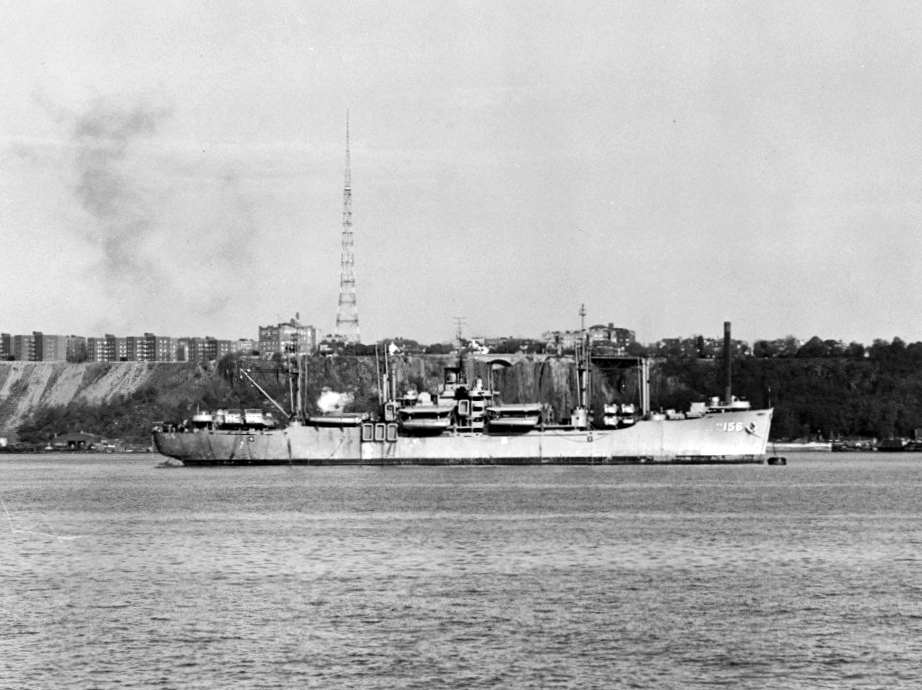
USS Mellette

Mellette was built by Oregon Shipbuilding Corporation. Her keel was laid on 3 June 1944. She was launched on 4 August and delivered on 27 September. Built for the United States Navy. Decommissioned in 1946 and placed in reserve at Yorktown, Virginia. Recommissioned in 1950. Decommissioned in 1955. Laid up in reserve at Charleston, South Carolina. Laid up in the James River in 1960. She was scrapped at Kaohsiung in 1988.

== Menard ==
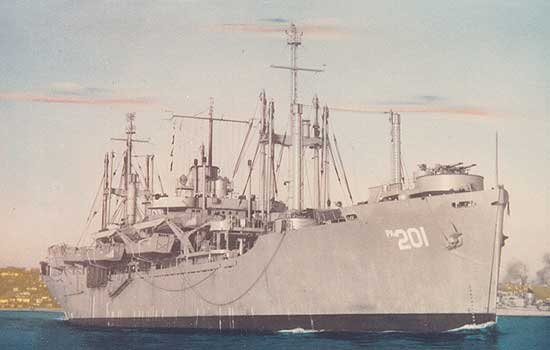
USS Menard

Menard was built by Kaiser Company. Her keel was laid on 12 July 1944. She was launched on 11 October and delivered on 31 October. Built for the United States Navy. Decommissioned in 1948. Laid up in reserve at Stockton, California. Recommissioned in 1950. Decommissioned in 1955. To the United States Maritime Administration in 1961. Laid up in Suisun Bay. She was scrapped in the United States in 1975.

== Menifee ==
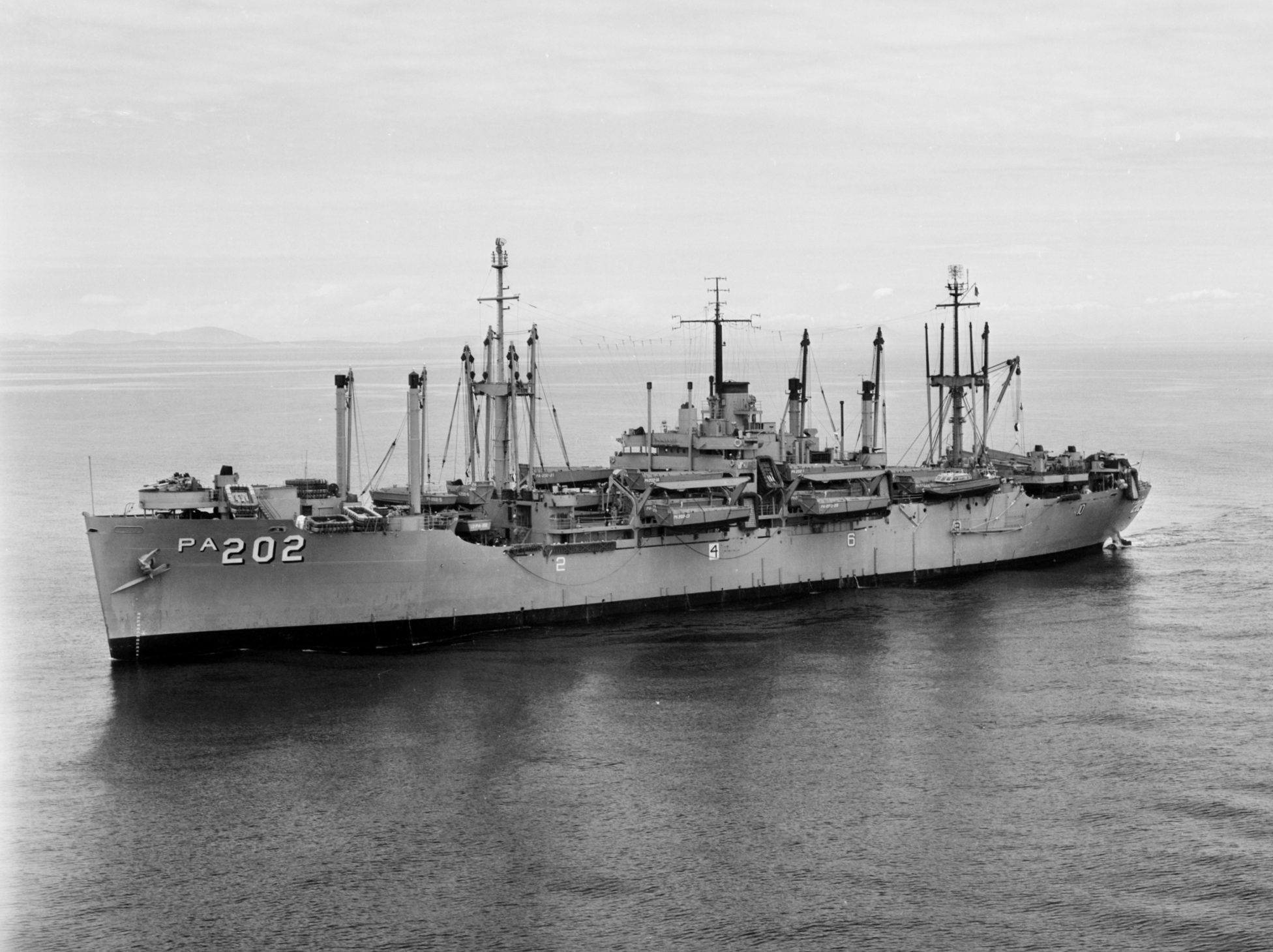
USS Menifee

Menifee was built by Kaiser Company. Her keel was laid on 21 July 1944. She was launched on 15 October and delivered on 4 November. Built for the United States Navy. Decommissioned in 1946. Laid up in reserve at Stockton. Recommissioned in 1950. Decommissioned in 1955. To the United States Maritime Administration in 1959. Laid up in Suisun Bay. She was scrapped in the United States in 1975.

== Mercer Victory ==
Mercer Victory was built by Permanente Metals Corporation. Her keel was laid on 26 January 1945. She was launched on 14 March and delivered on 11 April. Built for the WSA, she was operated under the management of States Marine Lines, Inc. Laid up at Wilmington, North Carolina in 1948. Returned to service in 1966 due to the Vietnam War. Operated under the management of American President Lines. Laid up in Suisun Bay in 1973. She was scrapped in Kaohsiung in 1988.

== Meredith Victory ==
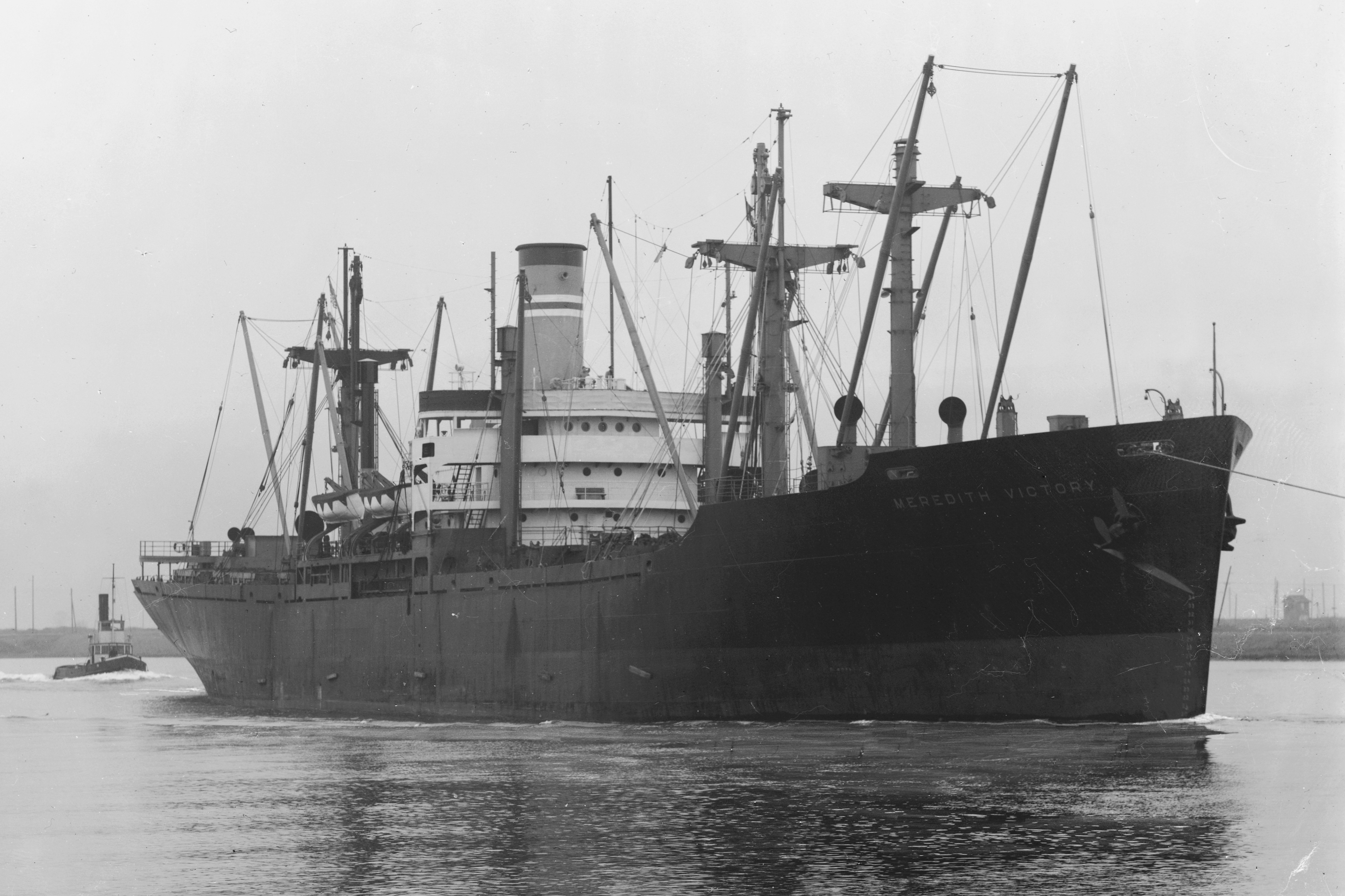
Meredith Victory

Meredith Victory was built by California Shipbuilding Corporation. Her keel was laid on 1 May 1945. She was launched on 23 June and delivered on 24 July. Built for the WSA, she was operated under the management of American President Lines. Laid up at Olympia in 1950. Returned to service in 1966 due to the Vietnam War. Operated under the management of American President Lines. Laid up in Suisun Bay in 1973. She was scrapped in China in 1993.

== Meridian Victory ==
Meridian Victory was built by California Shipbuilding Corporation. Her keel was laid on 26 April 1944. She was launched on 20 June and delivered on 5 August. Built for the WSA, she was operated under the management of Matson Navigation Co. Laid up in the Hudson River in 1948. Later transferred to Beaumont. She was scrapped at Tuxpan, Mexico in 1985.

== Meriwether ==
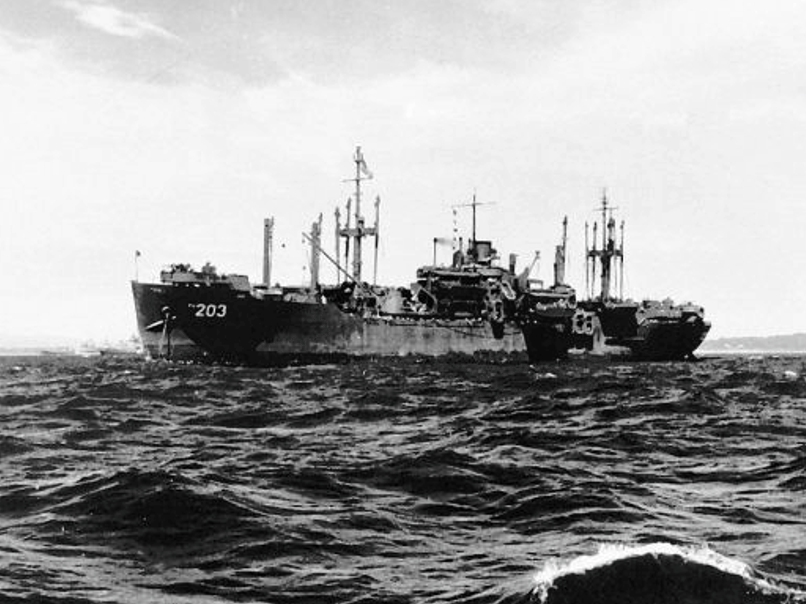
USS Meriwether

Meriwether was built by Kaiser Company. Her keel was laid on 27 July 1944. She was launched on 18 October and delivered on 7 November. Built for the United States Navy. Decommissioned in 1946. Laid up in reserve at Stockton. To the United States Maritime Administration in 1958. Laid up in Suisun Bay. She was scrapped in the United States in 1975.

== Mesa Victory ==
Mesa Victory was built by California Shipbuilding Corporation. Her keel was laid on 28 June 1945. She was launched on 6 September and delivered on 5 October. Built for the WSA, she was operated under the management of Olympic Steamship Company. Laid up in the James River in 1948. Sold in 1951 to Atlantic Ocean Transport Corp., New York and renamed Atlantic Victory. Sold in 1962 to Continental-Atlantic Corp., New York. Sold to American Union Transport Inc., New York in 1965 and renamed Transcaribbean. She was driven ashore on Bermuda on 30 September 1965. She was scrapped at Kaohsiung in October 1970.

== Mexico Victory ==
Mexico Victory was built by California Shipbuilding Corporation. Her keel was laid on 26 January 1944. She was launched on 27 March and delivered on 19 May. Built for the WSA, she was operated under the management of Luckenbach Steamship Co., Inc. Laid up in Suisun Bay in 1947. Sold later that year to Gdynia America Line, Gdańsk, Poland and renamed Kilinski. to Polish Ocean Lines, Gdańsk in 1951. She collided with the British yacht Tammie-Norrie in the Elbe on 18 August 1961. The yacht sank with the loss of five of the eight people on board. Laid up at Haiphong, Vietnam in 1972. Sold to Poul Christensen, Denmark in 1973 and renamed Lin. She was scrapped at Kaohsiung that year.

== Middlebury Victory ==
Middlebury Victory was built by Permanente Metals Corporation. Her keel was laid on 16 December 1944. She was launched on 3 February 1945 and delivered on 1 March. Built for the WSA, she was operated under the management of General Steamship Company. She ran aground on the Île de Planier, France on 27 January 1947 whilst on a voyage from Haifa, Palestine to New York. She was abandoned on 3 February and was declared a constructive total loss in October.

== Middlesex Victory ==
Middlesex Victory was built by Oregon Shipbuilding Corporation. Her keel was laid on 8 May 1945. She was launched on 26 June and delivered on 24 July. Built for the WSA, she was operated under the management of Pacific-Atlantic Steamship Company. Sold in 1948 to States Steamship Company, Tacoma and renamed Wyoming. To the United States Department of Commerce in 1961 and laid up. To the United States Navy in 1963 and renamed Cheyenne. Operated by the Military Sea Transportation Service. she was scrapped at Kaohsiung in 1974.

== Midland Victory ==
Midland Victory was built by Oregon Shipbuilding Corporation. Her keel was laid on 24 April 1945. She was launched on 12 June and delivered on 11 July. Built for the WSA, she was operated under the management of Northland Transportation Company. Sold in 1948 to Black Diamond Steamship Company, New York and renamed Black Eagle. Sold in 1949 to Coral Steamship Corp., New York. Renamed Seaclipper in 1951. Sold in 1952 to American-Hawaiian Steamship Company, New York and renamed Alaskan. Sold in 1956 to Matson Navigation Co. and renamed Hawaiian Tourist. Sold in 1962 to Tourist Shipping Corp., Wilmington, Delaware and renamed Smith Tourist. Renamed U.S. Tourist in 1965. Sold in 1967 to AEC Shipping Corp., Wilmington, Delaware. She was scrapped at Kaohsiung in March 1970.

== Mifflin ==
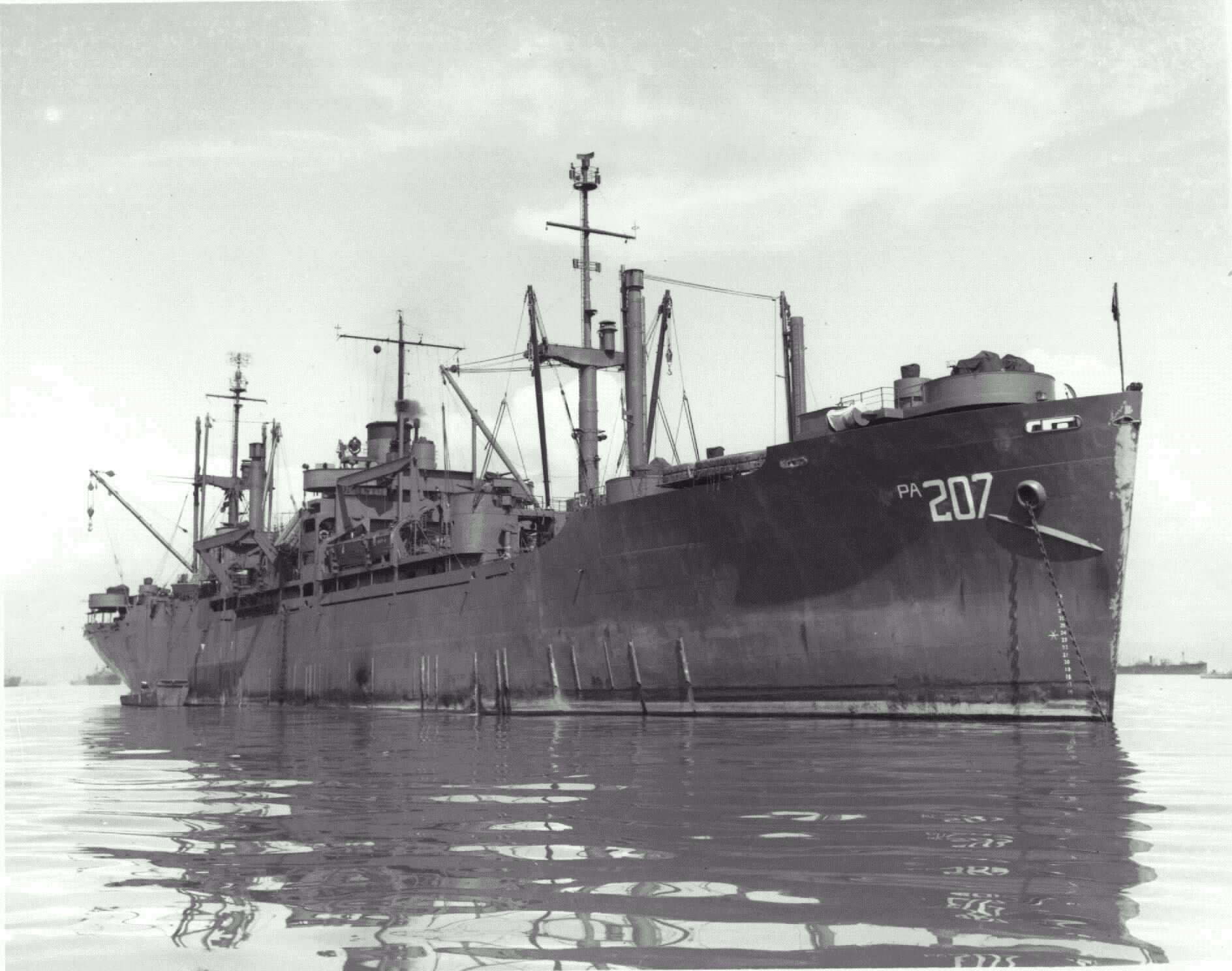
USS Mifflin

Mifflin was built by Permanente Metals Corporation. Her keel was laid on 15 May 1944. She was launched on 7 August and delivered on 11 October. Built for the United States Navy. Decommissioned in 1946 and laid up at Stockton. To the United States Maritime Administration in 1959. Laid up in Suisun Bay. She was sold to West Waterway Lumber Co., Seattle in 1975 for non-transportation use.

== Milford Victory ==
Milford Victory was a troop transport built by Bethlehem Fairfield Shipyard. Her keel was laid on 22 December 1944. She was launched on 19 February 1945 and delivered on 20 March. Built for the WSA, she was operated under the management of Grace Line Inc. Sold in 1946 to Holland-Amerika Lijn, Rotterdam, Netherlands and renamed Abbedijk. Renamed Abbedyk in 1954. Sold in 1957 to Persian Shipping Services, London and renamed John L. Manta. Owners later renamed to Iranian Shipping Services. Sold in 1967 to Naviran S.A., Iran and renamed Cyrus II. She was damaged by fire at Durban on 11 November 1968. She was seized by Durban Port Authority in 1969 as likely to become an obstruction, wreck or derelict. Sold at auction in May to Durban scrap merchants. Resold, she departed under tow of the tug Groningen on 9 October 1969. She was scrapped at Kaohsiung in January 1970.

== Mills Victory ==
Mills Victory was built by Permanente Metals Corporation. Her keel was laid on 14 February 1945. She was launched on 28 March and delivered on 21 April. Built for the WSA, she was operated under the management of American-Hawaiian Steamship Company. To the United States Army Transportation Corps in 1947 and renamed Sgt. Morris E. Crain. To the United States Navy in 1950. Operated by the Military Sea Transportation Service. She was sold for scrapping at Tacoma in 1975.

== Minot Victory ==
Minot Victory was built by Oregon Shipbuilding Corporation. Her keel was laid on 27 October 1944. She was launched on 4 December and delivered on 1 February 1945. Built for the WSA, she was operated under the management of American Mail Line. Laid up at Wilmington, North Carolina in 1948. Later transferred to Beaumont. She was scrapped at Tuxpan in 1985.

== Missoula ==
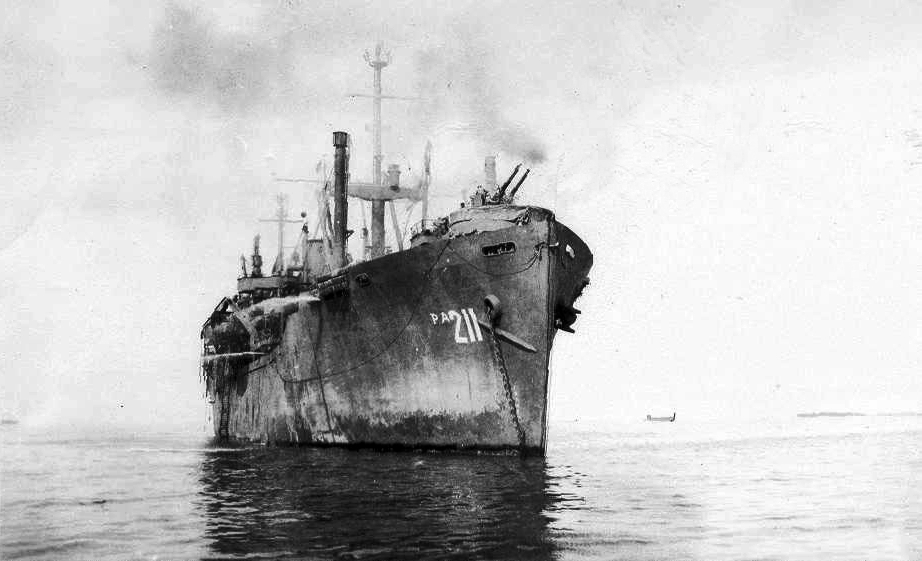
USS Missoula

Missoula was built by Permanente Metals Corporation. Her keel was laid on 20 June 1944. She was launched on 6 September and delivered on 27 October. Built for the United States Navy. Decommissioned in 1946. Laid up in reserve at Mare Island, California. To the United States Maritime Administration in 1958. Laid up in Suisun Bay. She was scrapped in the United States in 1975.

== M. I. T. Victory ==
M. I. T. Victory was a troop transport built by Bethlehem Fairfield Shipyard. Her keel was laid on 23 March 1945. She was launched on 12 May and delivered on 5 June. Built for the WSA, she was operated under the management of T. J. Stevenson & Company, Inc. To the United States Army Transportation Corps in 1947 and renamed Lt. Alexander R. Nininger. To the United States Department of Commerce in 1949 and laid up in the Hudson River. Later transferred to the James River. She was scrapped at Rotterdam in 1974.

== Moline Victory ==
Moline Victory was built by Permanente Metals Corporation. Her keel was laid on 16 December 1944. She was launched on 31 January 1945 and delivered on 28 February. Built for the WSA, she was operated under the management of W. R. Chamberlin & Company. Laid up at Wilmington, North Carolina in 1948. Sold in 1951 to Prudential Steamship Corporation. New York. To Prudential Lines Inc., New York in 1963. To United States Department of Commerce in 1965. Laid up in the Hudson River. She was scrapped at Philadelphia in November 1968.

== Monroe Victory ==
Monroe Victory was built by California Shipbuilding Corporation. Her keel was laid on 1 December 1944. She was launched on 24 January 1945 and delivered on 23 February. Built for the WSA, she was operated under the management of Isthmian Steamship Company. Laid up at Mobile in 1950. Later transferred to Suisun Bay. Sold to Union Minerals and Alloys Corporation, New York in 1974 for non-transportation use.

== Montclair Victory ==
Montclair Victory was a troop transport built by Bethlehem Fairfield Shipyard. Her keel was laid on 22 September 1944. She was launched on 16 November and delivered on 13 December. Built for the WSA, she was operated under the management of Agwilines Inc. Laid up in Suisun Bay in 1946. She was scrapped at Portland, Oregon in 1975.

== Montrose ==
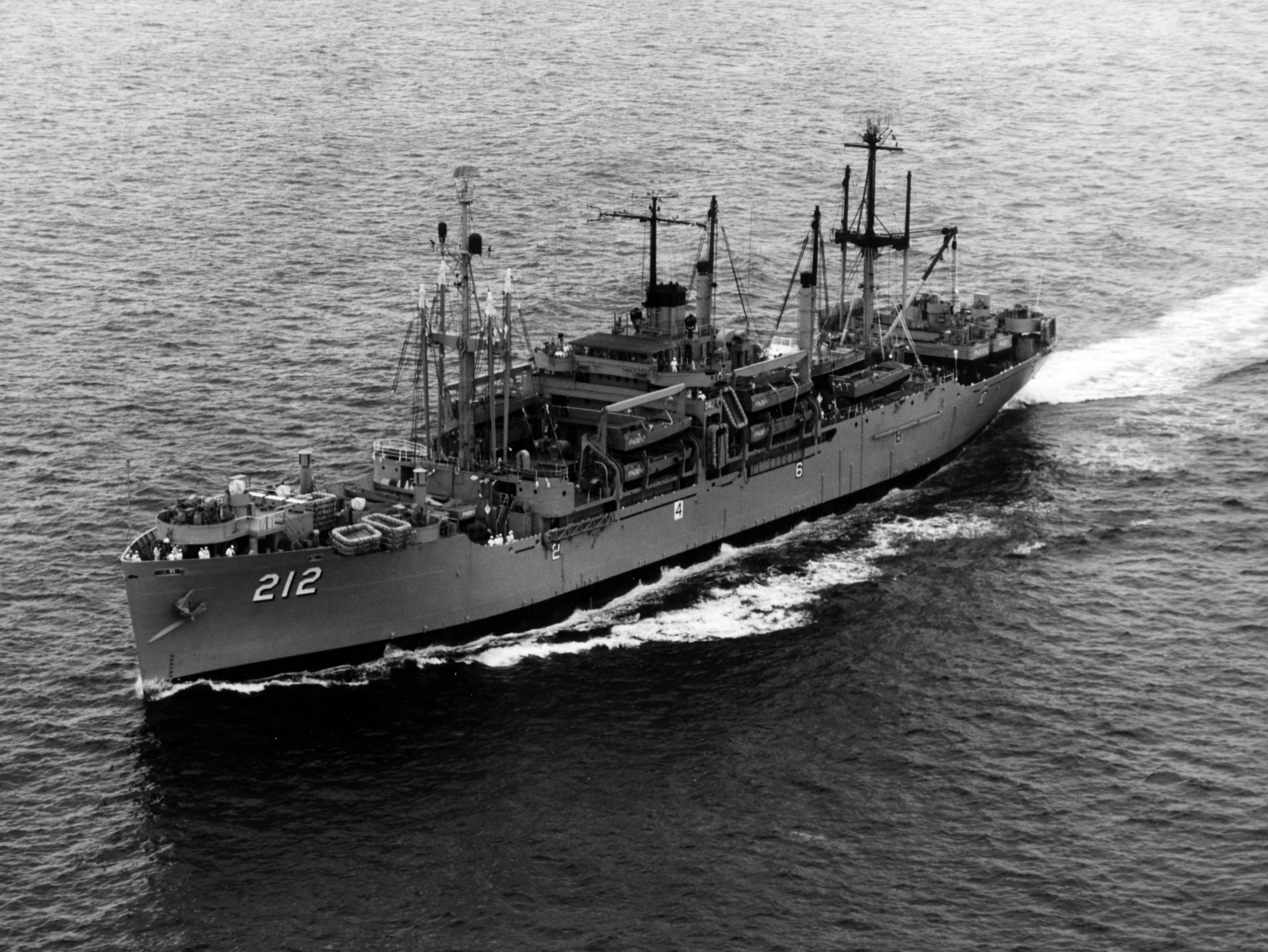
USS Montrose

Montrose was built by Permanente Metals Corporation. Her keel was laid on 17 June 1944. She was launched on 13 September and delivered on 2 November. Built for the United States Navy. Decommissioned in 1946. Laid up in reserve at Stockton. Recommissioned in 1950. Decommission in 1969. She was scrapped at Portland, Oregon in 1970.

== Morgantown Victory ==
Morgantown Victory was built by Bethlehem Fairfield Shipyard. Her keel was laid on 12 December 1944. She was launched on 5 February 1945 and delivered on 28 February. Built for the WSA, she was operated under the management of States Marine Lines, Inc. Laid up in Suisun Bay in 1946. Returned to service in 1966 due to the Vietnam War. Operated under the management of Pacific Far East Line. Laid up in Suisun Bay in 1973. She was scrapped at Kaohsiung in 1984.

== Mount Holyoke Victory ==
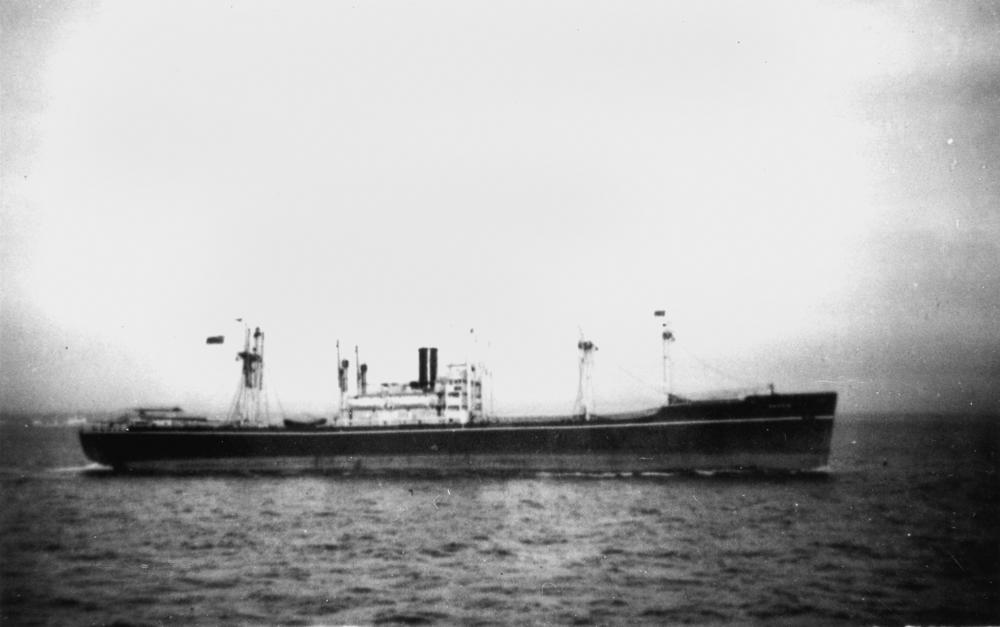
Nankin

Mount Holyoke Victory was built by Permanente Metals Corporation. Her keel was laid on 5 January 1945. She was launched on 17 February and delivered on 14 March. Built for the WSA, she was operated under the management of Alaska Packers' Association. Sold in 1947 to Eastern & Australian Steamship Co., London and renamed Nankin. Sold in 1966 to Universal Mariners S.A., Panama and renamed Bolina. She was scrapped at Kaohsiung in March 1972.

== Mountrail ==
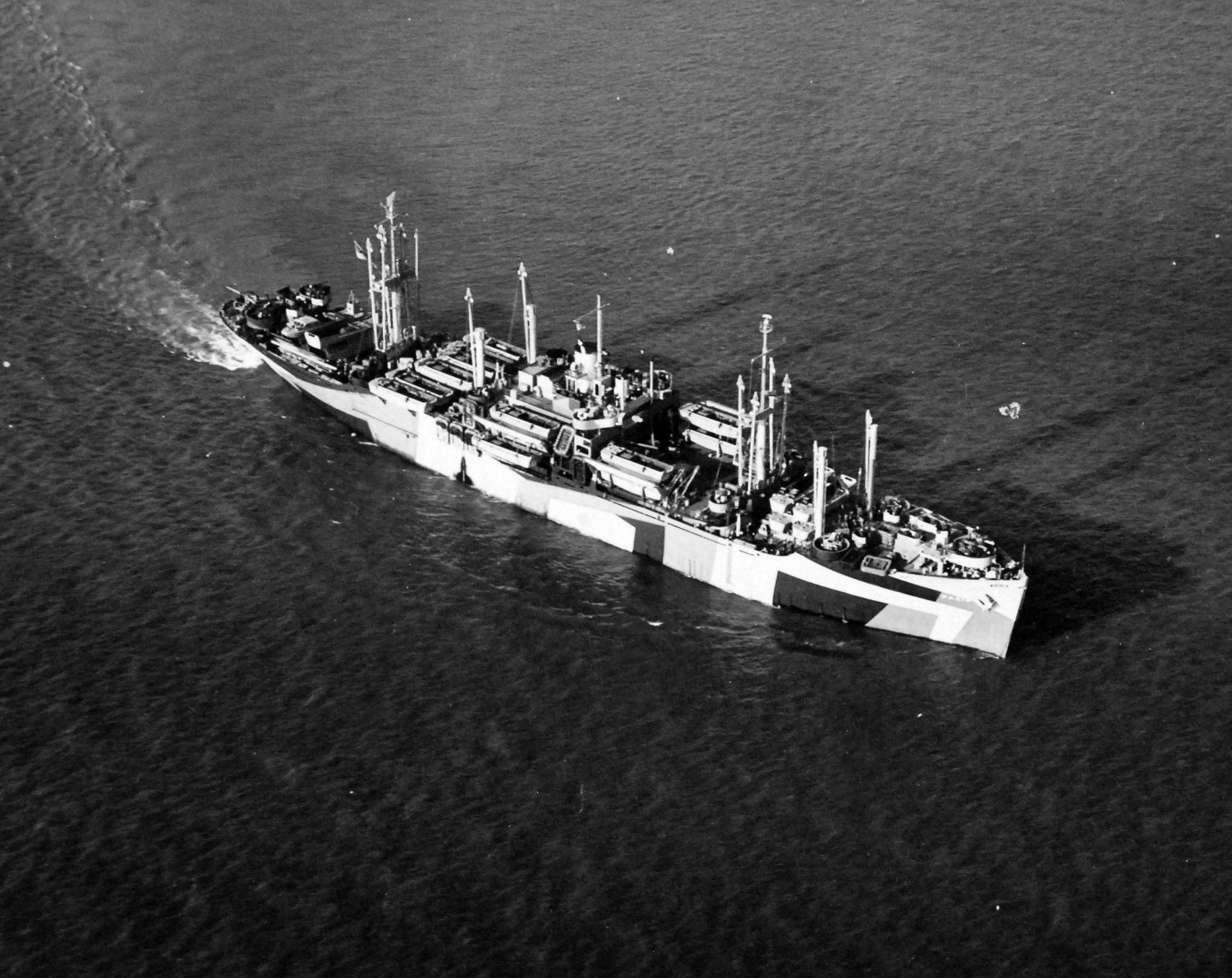
USS Mountrail

Mountrail was built by Permanente Metals Corporation. Her keel was laid on 24 June 1944. She was launched on 20 September and delivered on 16 November. Built for the United States Navy. Decommissioned in 1950. Laid up in reserve at Stockton. Recommissioned in 1950. Decommissioned in 1955. To United States Maritime Administration in 1959. To United States Navy in 1961. To United States Maritime Administration in 1969. Laid up in the James River. She was scrapped at Alang in 1990.

== Muhlenberg Victory ==
Muhlenberg Victory was built by Bethlehem Fairfield Shipyard. Her keel was laid on 23 May 1945. She was launched on 12 July and delivered on 15 August. Built for the WSA, she was operated under the management of Smith & Johnson. Built as a standard cargo ship, she was converted to a troop carrier by Todd Shipyards, Brooklyn, New York in 1945. Converted to a livestock carrier by Todd Shipyards in 1946. Laid up at Wilmington, North Carolina in 1948. Returned to service in 1966 due to the Vietnam War. Operated under the management of Matson Navigation Company. Laid up in Suisun Bay in 1973. She was scrapped in 1993.

== Muncie Victory ==
Muncie Victory was built by Permanente Metals Corporation. Her keel was laid on 9 October 1944. She was launched on 7 December and delivered on 14 January 1945. Built for the WSA, she was operated under the management of Sudden & Christenson. Laid up in the James River in 1947. Sold in 1951 to Moore-McCormack Lines, New York and renamed Mormacspruce. Sold in 1955 to Black Dragon Steamship Corp., New York and renamed Black Dragon. Operated under the management of Isbrandtsen Co. Sold in 1957 to Compania Maritime Unidas, Liberia and renamed Tappanzee. Sold in 1959 to Central Gulf Steamship Corp., New Orleans, Louisiana and renamed Green Island. Lengthened by 90 feet (27 m) in 1962 by Deutsche Werft, Hamburg, West Germany in 1962. Now 545 feet 0 inches (166.12 m) long, 9,465 GRT, 13,987 DWT. She was scrapped at Kaohsiung in December 1971.
