= SS Park Victory =

WWII American cargo ship

- Typical Victory Ship.

History

United States
- Name: Park Victory
- Namesake: Park University in Parkville, Missouri
- Owner: War Shipping Administration
- Operator: Seas Shipping Company
- Builder: Permanente Metals, Richmond, California
- Yard number: Richmond Shipyards #2
- Laid down: 11 March 1945
- Launched: 21 April 1945
- Acquired: 16 May 1945
- Recommissioned: In 1946 was converted to livestock carrier.
- Fate: Sank after accidental grounding in the Gulf of Finland on December 25, 1947

General characteristics
- Class & type: VC2-S-AP3 Victory ship
- Tonnage: 7,612 GRT, 4,553 NRT
- Displacement: 15,200 tons
- Length: 455 ft (139 m)
- Beam: 62 ft (19 m)
- Draught: 28 ft (8.5 m)
- Installed power: 8,500 shp (6,300 kW)
- Propulsion: HP & LP turbines geared to a single 20.5-foot (6.2 m) propeller
- Speed: 16.5 knots (30.6 km/h; 19.0 mph)
- Boats & landing craft carried: 4 lifeboats
- Complement: 62 Merchant Marine and 28 US Naval Armed Guards
- Armament: 1 × 5-inch (127 mm)/38 caliber gun; 1 × 3-inch (76 mm)/50 caliber gun; 8 × 20 mm Oerlikon; Removed in 1947

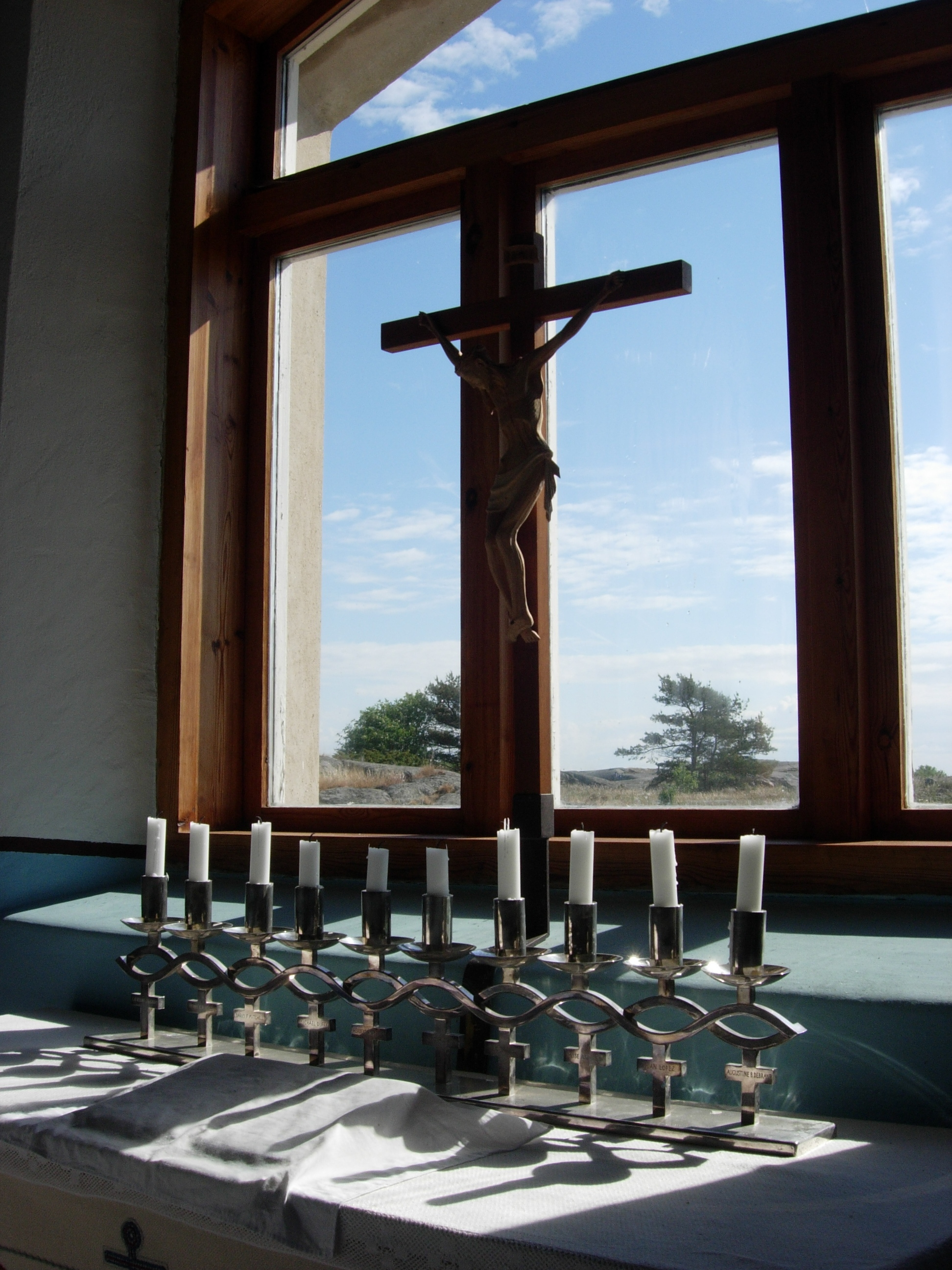
Park Victory commemorative candle holder in Utö Chapel

SS Park Victory was a Victory-class cargo ship built during World War II under the Emergency Shipbuilding program. The ship was operated by the Seas Shipping Company. The ship launched on April 21, 1945, near the end of the war.

The ship was named in honor of Park College (now Park University), one of 150 educational institutions that had Victory ships named after them. Park College was selected as a training center for the V-12 Navy College Training Program from 1943 to 1945. This partnership between the Navy and Park College may have led to the naming of a ship in the college's honor. In reciprocation, Park College donated $300 to buy 120 books for the library aboard the Park Victory. The launching ceremony on April 21, 1945, was attended by several Park alumni.

In 1946, the SS Park Victory was converted to livestock carrier, manned by sea cowboys. The Park Victory loaded up with 485 horses and 322 heifers and steamed out of Baltimore on October 25, 1945. She arrived in Trieste, Italy, and unloaded the livestock. The livestock were then transported by train and trucks to Yugoslavia.

From 1945 to 1947 the United Nations Relief and Rehabilitation Administration and the Brethren Service Committee of the Church of the Brethren sent livestock to war-torn countries. These "seagoing cowboys" made about 360 trips on 73 different ships. The Heifers for Relief project was started by the Church of the Brethren started in 1942, in 1953 this became Heifer International program. The SS Carroll Victory was also one of these ships, known as a cowboy ship, as she moved livestock across the Atlantic Ocean. The SS Park Victory moved horses, heifers, and mules also a few chicks, rabbits, and goats.

SS Park Victory, heading to Helsinki with a cargo of coal, sank near Utö in the outer Archipelago Sea on Christmas night, about 02.15 AM local time (UTC+2), December 25, 1947 after running aground on rocks when the anchor failed in a storm. The rock opened a hole in the engine room and a boiler explosion followed. The ship sank just off the Utö Lighthouse, at about 59.780947°N 21.368122°E The Master of the ship, Allen Zepp, initially lost his license when a Coast Guard examiner said that Zepp failed to maintain an adequate anchor watch. The decision was overturned on appeal.

Thirty-eight crew members of total of 48 survived the ordeal. The survivors underwent severe hardship, as the winter storm brought with it up to three feet of snow, through which the survivors had to make their way after having been brought ashore, many of them bare foot.

The Park Victory sinking was the first exposure of the Utö pilot and lighthouse crew community to contemporary American culture. The interracial relations on Park Victory shocked them and sparked legends that were shared for decades.

The 38 survivors along with 2 bodies left Utö island on December 26 and headed back to the United States. After the crew returned home, the helpful islanders were sent coffee and sugar to thank the people who brought them to the shore and took them to shelter in their homes. The villagers sold the gift sugar and coffee, which was scarce just after the war, and with the money, they went on to order a special commemorative silver candle holder that holds 10 candles. On the candle holder are engraved the names of crew members who perished in the accident. Every Christmas Eve, the candles are lit in the Utö church chapel in memory of the accident and the lives that were lost that night. The U.S. government publicly acknowledged its appreciation to the community of Utö for the rescue, housing and food give to the survivors, thank you letters are framed hung on the wall of the chapel in the lighthouse.

== See also ==
- List of Victory ships
- Liberty ship
- Type C1 ship
- Type C2 ship
- Type C3 ship

== Sources ==
- Sawyer, L.A. and W.H. Mitchell. Victory ships and tankers: The history of the ‘Victory’ type cargo ships and of the tankers built in the United States of America during World War II, Cornell Maritime Press, 1974, 0-87033-182-5.
- United States Maritime Commission:
- Victory Cargo Ships
