= USNS Clemson =

1945 victory-class cargo ship

- Typical Victory ship

History

United States
- Name: Lindenwood Victory
- Namesake: Lindenwood University
- Builder: Permanente Metals Yard No. 2, Richmond, California
- Laid down: 12 May 1945
- Launched: 23 June 1945
- In service: 25 July 1945
- Out of service: 19 January 1970
- Identification: IMO number: 5208891
- Fate: Sold for scrapping, 22 February 1994

General characteristics
- Class & type: VC2-S-AP3 Victory ship
- Tonnage: 7,612 GRT, 4,553 NRT
- Displacement: 15,200 tons
- Length: 455 ft (139 m)
- Beam: 62 ft (19 m)
- Draught: 28 ft (8.5 m)
- Installed power: 8,500 shp (6,300 kW)
- Propulsion: HP & LP turbines geared to a single 20.5-foot (6.2 m) propeller
- Speed: 16.5 knots (30.6 km/h; 19.0 mph)
- Boats & landing craft carried: 4 lifeboats
- Complement: 62 Merchant Marine and 28 US Naval Armed Guards
- Armament: 1 × 5-inch (127 mm)/38 caliber gun; 1 × 3-inch (76 mm)/50 caliber gun; 8 × 20 mm Oerlikon

SS Lindenwood Victory was a Victory-class cargo ship built during World War II. Lindenwood Victory was a type VC2-S-AP2 victory ship built by Permanente Metals Corporation, Yard 2, of Richmond, California. The Maritime Administration cargo ship was the 766th ship built. Her keel was laid on May 12, 1945. Lindenwood Victory was an armed cargo ship She was built in just 70 days, under the Emergency Shipbuilding program for World War II. Lindenwood Victory was an armed cargo ship, named for Lindenwood University in St. Charles, Missouri, one of 150 educational institutions that had Victory ships named after them. The 10,600-ton ship was constructed for the Maritime Commission.

Victory ships were designed to replace the earlier Liberty ships. Liberty ships were designed to be used just for World War II. Victory ships were designed to last longer and serve the US Navy after the war. The Victory ship differed from a Liberty ship in that they were: faster, longer and wider, taller, a thinner stack set farther toward the superstructure and had a long raised forecastle.

== World War II ==
For World War II the Lindenwood Victory was operated by the Alcoa Steamship Company under the United States Merchant Marine act for the War Shipping Administration. She had United States Navy Armed Guard to man the deck guns. She took cargo to support troops in the Pacific War. The goods were for the Battle of Okinawa operations, that lasted from 1 April until 22 June 1945. On 9 May 1945 at Okinawa

== War relief and Seacowboys ==
In 1946 after World War II the Lindenwood Victory was converted to a livestock ship, also called a cowboy ship. From 1945 to 1947 the United Nations Relief and Rehabilitation Administration and the Brethren Service Committee of the Church of the Brethren sent livestock to war-torn countries. These "seagoing cowboys" made about 360 trips on 73 different ships. The Heifers for Relief project was started by the Church of the Brethren in 1942; in 1953 this became Heifer International. The SS Lindenwood Victory was one of these ships, known as cowboy ships, as she moved livestock across the Atlantic Ocean. In the April and June of 1946 she took 780 horses, several thousand baby chicks and hay bales to Poland on each trip. Lindenwood Victory moved horses, heifers, and mules as well as some chicks, rabbits, and goats.

In 1947 with her war and relief work done she was laid up in the James River as part of the National Defense Reserve Fleet. In 1950 a new war was starting in the Far East so she was removed from the Reserve Fleet.

== Korean War ==
SS Lindenwood Victory served as merchant marine ship supplying goods for the Korean War. About 75 percent of the personnel taking to Korea for the Korean War came by the merchant marine ship. SS Lindenwood Victory transported goods, mail, food and other supplies. About 90 percent of the cargo was moved by merchant marine naval to the war zone. SS Lindenwood Victory made trips between 1950 and 1952, helping American forces engaged against Communist aggression in South Korea. In 1952 she was returned to the National Defense Reserve Fleet.

== Vietnam War ==
In 1966 she was reactivated for Vietnam War and operated by Matson Nav.Company. Many of her trips were to deliver bombs for the B-52 bombers.

In 1973 she was laid up at Suisun Bay. In 1994 she was scrapped in China.

== US Navy ==
USNS Clemson (T-AG-184) was one of 12 ships scheduled to be acquired by the United States Navy in February 1966 and converted into Forward Depot Ships and placed into service with the Military Sea Transport Service, The Lindenwood Victory (MCV-766) was chosen for this conversion and assigned the name Clemson but the program was canceled and the ships were not acquired by the Navy.

== See also ==
- List of Victory ships
- Liberty ship
- Type C1 ship
- Type C2 ship
- Type C3 ship

== Sources ==
- Sawyer, L. A. and W. H. Mitchell. Victory ships and tankers: The history of the 'Victory' type cargo ships and of the tankers built in the United States of America during World War II, Cornell Maritime Press, 1974, 0-87033-182-5.
- United States Maritime Commission: Victory Ships built by the U.S. Maritime Commission during World War II: Alphabetical List
- Victory Cargo Ships—WWII US Navy Armed Guard Veterans (armedguard)
