= Utö (Finland) =

Island in Pargas, Finland

Coordinates: 59°47′N 021°22′E

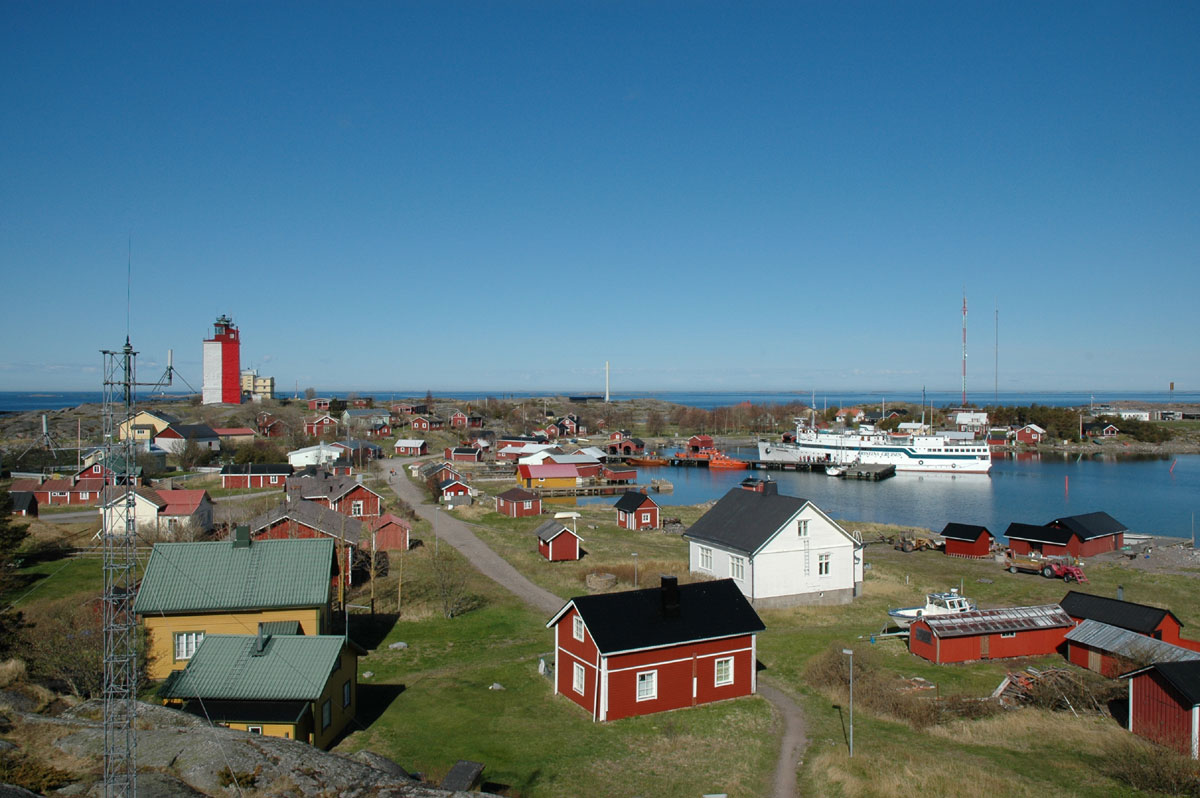
Utö

Utö Lighthouse

Utö (Finland Swedish: [ˈʉːtøː]) is a small island in the Archipelago Sea in the Baltic Sea and belongs to Finland's Pargas municipality. It is the southernmost year-round inhabited island in Finland. Utö has an area of 0.81 square kilometres (5/16 square mile) and the population was c. 40 (as of 2005).

== Name ==
The name of the island, Utö, means "outer island" in Swedish.

== Description ==
The island has a lighthouse, pilot station, a small guest harbour, a shop and a post office. The island is also known from the marine weather observations that began in 1881. Due to the remoteness of the island, the island has its own local school. In former times, the Finnish Defence Forces kept a small station on the island, but left the island in 2005. The island is also known as the first rescue station of the Estonia disaster in September 1994, and also helped rescue the survivors of the SS Park Victory sinking.

The Utö lighthouse is painted to resemble the signal flag "H", indicating the maritime pilot station. Its light signal is four short flashes, the same as the Morse code "H".

== Climate ==
The annual average temperature (1981–2010 data) at Utö is 6.5 °C (43.7 °F), with mean annual precipitation 549 mm (21.61 inches). Average snow-covered period last from 23 January to 15 March. The open sea areas around Utö are covered by ice only approximately every five years.

Utö has a humid continental climate (Dfb) (0˚C, 32˚F isotherm) or an oceanic climate (Cfb) (-3˚C, 26,6˚F isotherm) with mild summers and moderately cold and relatively long but late winters compared to the nearby southern mainland Finland because of seasonal lag caused by the Baltic Sea.

Climate data for Utö (1991-2020 normals, records 1959-present, snowy days 1996-2023)
Month	Jan	Feb	Mar	Apr	May	Jun	Jul	Aug	Sep	Oct	Nov	Dec	Year
Record high °C (°F)	7.7 (45.9)	6.7 (44.1)	11.6 (52.9)	15.9 (60.6)	24.3 (75.7)	25.9 (78.6)	29.2 (84.6)	27.1 (80.8)	22.3 (72.1)	17.0 (62.6)	12.8 (55.0)	9.2 (48.6)	29.2 (84.6)
Mean maximum °C (°F)	5.1 (41.2)	3.9 (39.0)	5.2 (41.4)	10.3 (50.5)	17.1 (62.8)	20.4 (68.7)	23.9 (75.0)	23.3 (73.9)	19.1 (66.4)	14.0 (57.2)	9.4 (48.9)	6.7 (44.1)	24.6 (76.3)
Mean daily maximum °C (°F)	1.4 (34.5)	0.2 (32.4)	1.8 (35.2)	5.6 (42.1)	10.7 (51.3)	15.6 (60.1)	19.8 (67.6)	19.6 (67.3)	15.3 (59.5)	9.9 (49.8)	5.9 (42.6)	3.5 (38.3)	9.1 (48.4)
Daily mean °C (°F)	−0.1 (31.8)	−1.4 (29.5)	0.0 (32.0)	3.2 (37.8)	7.9 (46.2)	13.0 (55.4)	17.3 (63.1)	17.4 (63.3)	13.4 (56.1)	8.4 (47.1)	4.6 (40.3)	2.0 (35.6)	7.1 (44.9)
Mean daily minimum °C (°F)	−1.8 (28.8)	−3.1 (26.4)	−1.6 (29.1)	1.4 (34.5)	5.8 (42.4)	11.1 (52.0)	15.4 (59.7)	15.7 (60.3)	11.9 (53.4)	7.0 (44.6)	3.2 (37.8)	0.5 (32.9)	5.5 (41.8)
Mean minimum °C (°F)	−9.1 (15.6)	−10.3 (13.5)	−7.0 (19.4)	−2.1 (28.2)	2.1 (35.8)	7.5 (45.5)	12.0 (53.6)	11.9 (53.4)	7.8 (46.0)	1.4 (34.5)	−2.1 (28.2)	−5.0 (23.0)	−12.5 (9.5)
Record low °C (°F)	−31.3 (−24.3)	−28.0 (−18.4)	−21.7 (−7.1)	−15.3 (4.5)	−1.2 (29.8)	0.8 (33.4)	7.0 (44.6)	7.4 (45.3)	0.6 (33.1)	−4.5 (23.9)	−9.9 (14.2)	−22.4 (−8.3)	−31.3 (−24.3)
Average precipitation mm (inches)	44 (1.7)	34 (1.3)	32 (1.3)	24 (0.9)	29 (1.1)	42 (1.7)	48 (1.9)	58 (2.3)	57 (2.2)	66 (2.6)	62 (2.4)	57 (2.2)	553 (21.6)
Average precipitation days (≥ 0.1 mm)	17	15	12	10	9	10	9	12	12	16	18	19	159
Average snowy days	16.0	16.9	14.0	2.3	0.0	0.0	0.0	0.0	0.0	0.1	3.4	10.3	63.1
Average relative humidity (%)	86	86	85	83	82	82	81	80	81	82	85	86	83
Mean monthly sunshine hours	37	61	152	222	318	315	326	272	188	98	34	26	2,049
Source 1: FMI climatological normals for Finland 1991–2020 Weatheronline.co.uk
Source 2: record highs and lows

== See also ==
- Bogskär
- Märket
- Nuorgam
- Virmajärvi
