= Seagoing cowboys =

Humanitarian aid mission after World War II

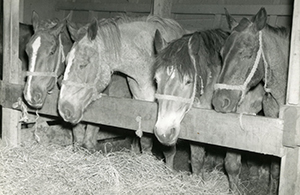
Horses on board the SS Cedar Rapids Victory

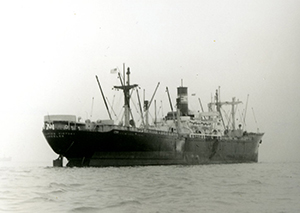
The livestock ship SS Cedar Rapids Victory

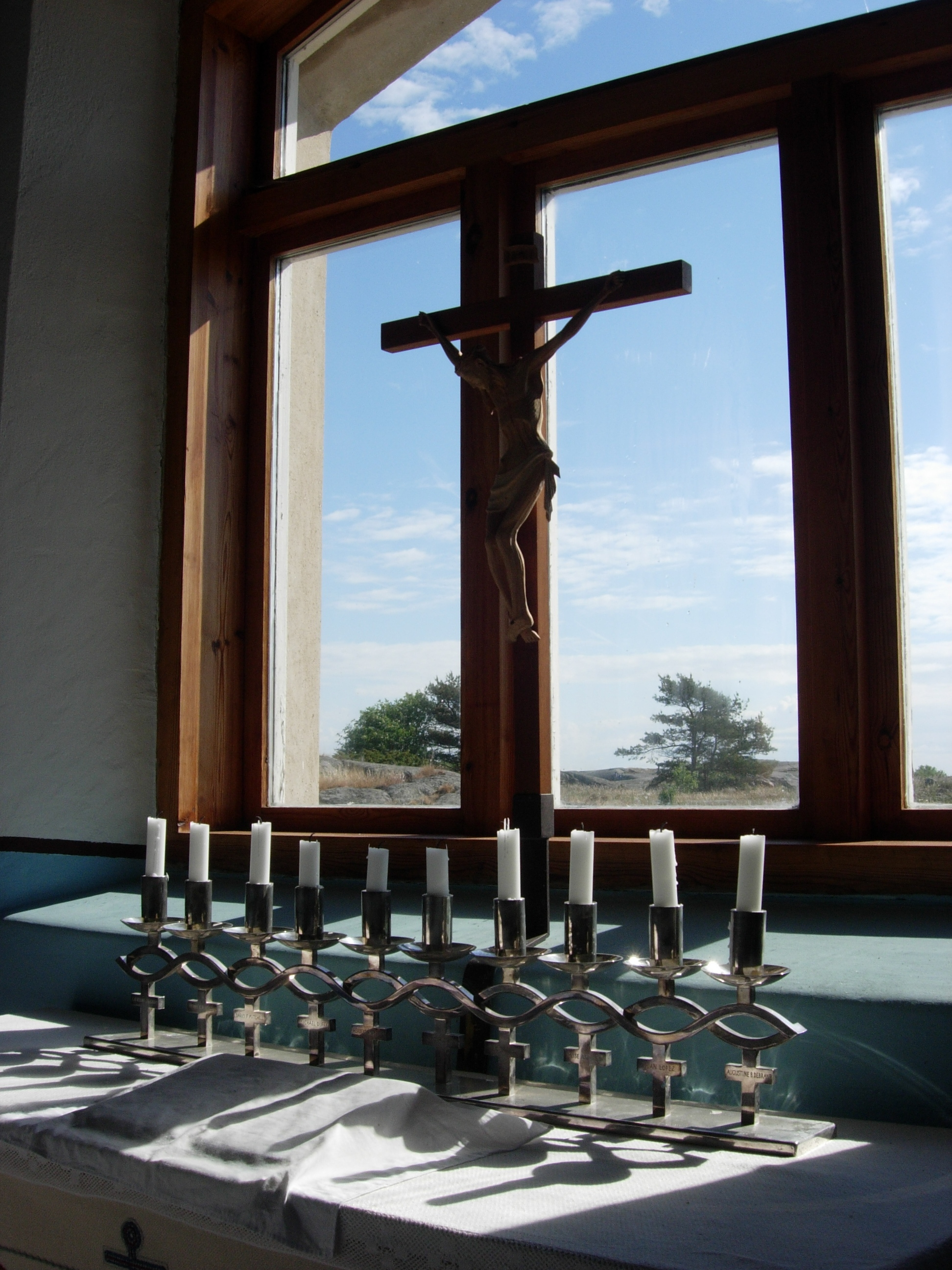
SS Park Victory commemorative candle holder in Utö Chapel, remembering the 10 lost Seagoing cowboys

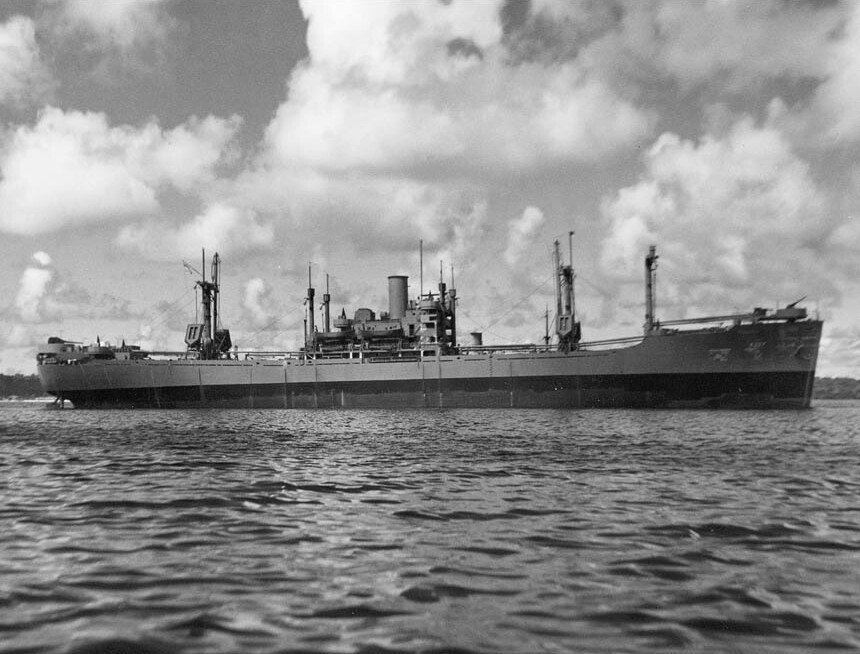
SS Boulder Victory Seagoing cowboys ship in 1946 and 1947. Boulder Victory made six trips moved horses, heifers, mules, chicks, rabbits, and goats across the Atlantic.

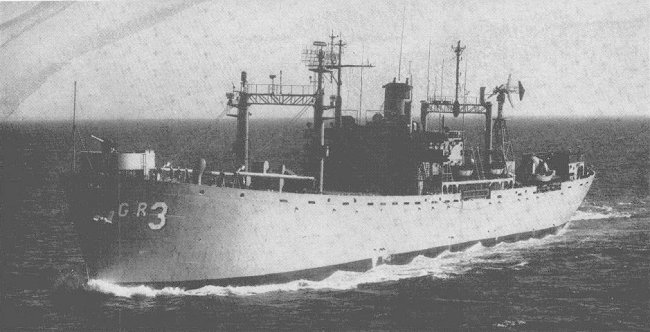
Liberty ship SS Raphael R. Rivera use as Seagoing cowboys ship

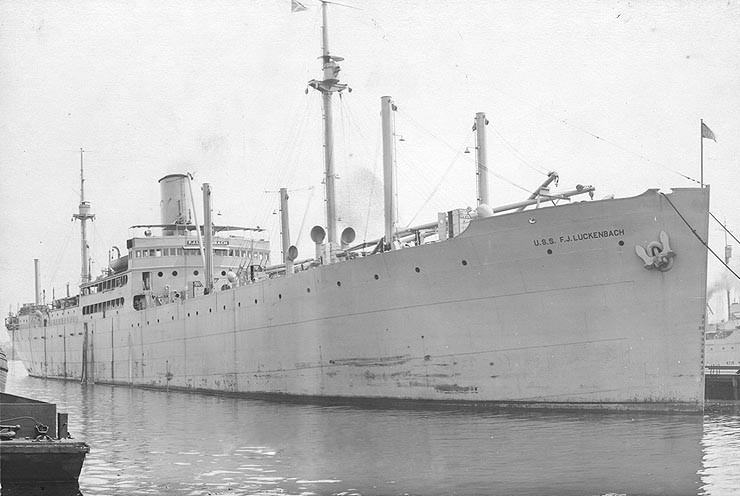
USS F. J. Luckenbach, WW1 Mule ship, used for Seagoing cowboys after WW2

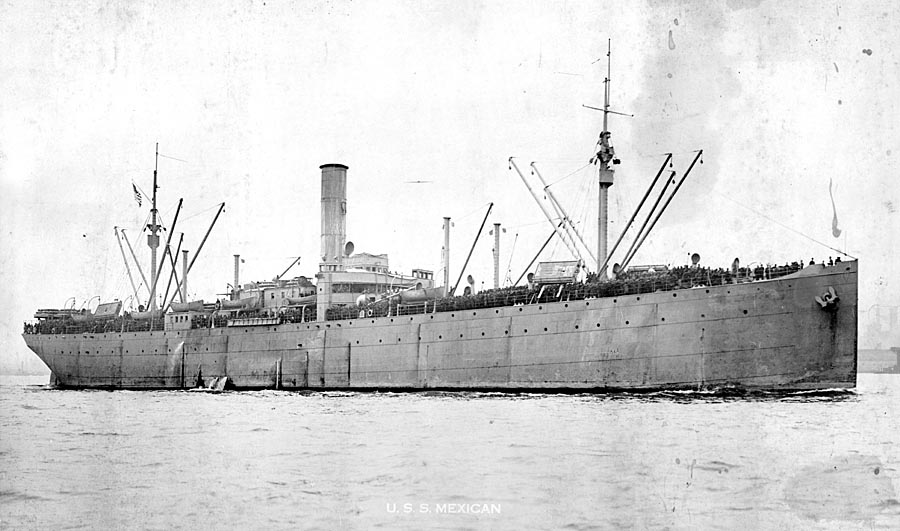
USS Mexican, WW1 Mule ship, used for Seagoing cowboys after WW2

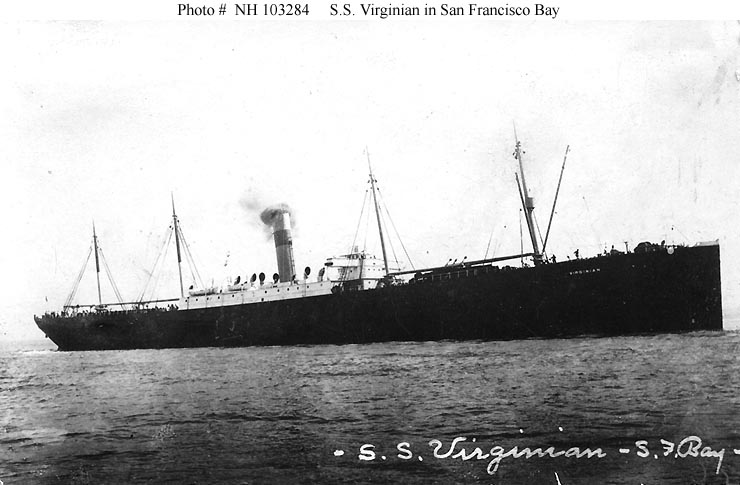
USS Virginian, WW1 Mule ship, used for Seagoing cowboys after WW2

Seagoing cowboys is a term used for men and ships used from 1945 to 1947 for United Nations Relief and Rehabilitation Administration and the Brethren Service Committee of the Church of the Brethren that sent livestock to war-torn countries. These seagoing cowboys made about 360 trips on 73 different ships. Most of the ships were converted World War II cargo ships with added cages and horse stalls. The Heifers for Relief project was started by the Church of the Brethren in 1942; in 1953 this became Heifer International. In the wake of the destruction caused by the Second World War, the historical peace churches in the United States (Church of the Brethren, the Society of Friends or "Quakers," and the Mennonites) sponsored relief missions to war-ravaged Europe, typically in cooperation with the United Nations Relief and Rehabilitation Administration (UNRRA). These relief missions usually took the form of transporting farm animals (such as heifers or horses), by transatlantic ship, to Poland and other countries where much of the livestock had been killed in the war. The men who tended the animals aboard these boats were called seagoing cowboys. These ships moved horses, heifers, and mules as well as chicks, rabbits, and goats. Ten seagoing cowboys died on the SS Park Victory when it sank after accidental grounding in the Gulf of Finland on December 25, 1947.

The Seagoing cowboys delivered to: Albania, China, Czechoslovakia (unloading in Bremen, Germany), Ethiopia, Greece, Italy, Poland, and Yugoslavia (unloading in Trieste, Italy). A total of 239,377 hoofed animals were transported. Over 7,000 men from the United States and Canada enlisted to be seagoing cowboys. Some 366 seagoing cowboys were from the Civilian Public Service.

== Heifer International ==
Heifer International, an organization founded by a member of the Church of the Brethren, mirrors those war relief programs by continuing, in the 21st century, to operate international relief missions that promote sustainable community agriculture by giving heifers and other farm animals to help people around the world. The organization encourages recipients to "pass on the gift," so that recipients become donors once the animal they receive produces offspring.

== Exhibit and conferences ==
On May 10, 2010, some surviving Seagoing Cowboys came to Funderburg Library at Manchester College in North Manchester, Indiana, for the dedication of the permanent Seagoing Cowboys exhibit put on by the Dan West and Heifer International.

A sixtieth anniversary conference commemorating and studying the historical significance of the seagoing cowboys in these relief efforts from 1946 through 1948 was held August 12–14, 2005, at the Church of the Brethren Service Center in New Windsor, Maryland.

From the 60th anniversary Seagoing Cowboys conference: "From 1946-48, more than 4,000 cows passed through the town of Union Bridge, Maryland on their way to the port of Baltimore where they were loaded onto liberty ships for Europe. The 'seagoing cowboys' who accompanied and cared for these animals came from farms across America. They had one goal in mind: to provide a continuous supply of milk to the children and their families of war-torn Europe by replenishing their lost livestock. This effort was known as Heifer Relief."

One of the cowboys was the future scientist Owen Gingerich.

== Ships ==
- 23 Liberty ships were used:
  - Stephen R. Mallory, Wesley Barrett, William D. Bloxham, Tobias E. Stansbury, John Barton Payne, Frederic C. Howe, Dudley H. Thomas, Robert W. Hart, and Rafael R. Rivera. (15 seagoing cowboys and with about 340 horses each trip)
  - US Army Mule Liberty ships: Santiago Iglesias, William S. Halsted, Charles W. Wooster, Henry Dearborn, William J. Palmer, Cyrus W. Field, John J. Crittenden, Samuel H. Walker, Alcee Fortier, Joshua Hendy, and Zona Gale. (15 seagoing cowboys)
- Type C4-class ship: Mount Whitney. (80 cowboys, made five trips to Poland with about 1,500 horses each trip)
- Three WWI Army cattle ships: F. J. Luckenbach, Mexican, Virginian
- 46 Victory ships with about 32 cowboys on each trip: (ships were temporary conversions of WW2 cargo ships, each make from 3 to 8 trips, with about 750 horses each trip)
  - SS Adrian Victory
  - SS Attleboro Victory
  - SS Battle Creek Victory
  - SS Beloit Victory
  - SS Blue Island Victory
  - SS Boulder Victory
  - SS Bucknell Victory
  - SS Calvin Victory
  - SS Cedar Rapids Victory
  - SS Carroll Victory
  - SS Clarksville Victory
  - SS Creighton Victory
  - SS DePauw Victory
  - SS Earlham Victory
  - SS Jefferson City Victory
  - SS Gainesville Victory
  - SS Hattiesburg Victory
  - SS Harvard Victory
  - SS Flagstaff Victory
  - SS Frontenac Victory
  - SS Lahaina Victory
  - SS Lanaina Victory
  - SS Lindenwood Victory
  - SS Norwalk Victory
  - SS Moline Victory
  - SS Morgantown Victory
  - SS Mercer Victory
  - SS Occidental Victory
  - SS Ouachita Victory
  - SS Park Victory Sank with loss of 10 crew
  - SS Pass Christian Victory
  - SS Pierre Victory
  - SS Plymouth Victory
  - SS Saginaw Victory
  - SS Santa ClaraVictory
  - SS Spartanburg Victory
  - SS South Bend Victory
  - SS Roswell Victory
  - SS Rockland Victory
  - SS Rock Hill Victory
  - SS Queens Victory
  - SS Woodstock Victory
  - SS Villanova Victory
  - SS Virginia City Victory
  - SS Wesleyan Victory
  - SS Yugoslavia Victory

== See also ==
- List of Victory ships
- Liberty ship
- Type C2 ship
- Type C3 ship
