= SS Morgantown Victory =

Victory ship of the United States

- Typical Victory Ship.

History

United States
- Name: SS Morgantown Victory
- Namesake: Morgantown, West Virginia
- Owner: War Shipping Administration
- Operator: States Marine Line
- Builder: Bethlehem-Fairfield Shipyard, Baltimore
- Laid down: 12 December 1944
- Launched: 5 February 1945
- Completed: 28 February 1945
- Identification: IMO number: 5241635
- Fate: Scrapped 1984

General characteristics
- Class & type: VC2-S-AP3 Victory ship
- Tonnage: 7612 GRT, 4,553 NRT
- Displacement: 15,200 tons
- Length: 455 ft (139 m)
- Beam: 62 ft (19 m)
- Draft: 28 ft (8.5 m)
- Installed power: 8,500 shp (6,300 kW)
- Propulsion: HP & LP turbines geared to a single 20.5-foot (6.2 m) propeller
- Speed: 16.5 knots
- Boats & landing craft carried: 4 Lifeboats
- Complement: 62 Merchant Marine and 28 US Naval Armed Guards
- Armament: 1 × 5 inch (127 mm)/38 caliber gun; 1 × 3 inch (76 mm)/50 caliber gun; 8 × 20 mm Oerlikon

SS Morgantown Victory was a Victory ship built during World War II under the Emergency Shipbuilding program. Morgantown Victory (MCV-632) was a type VC2-S-AP2 Victory ship built by Bethlehem-Fairfield Shipyards. The Maritime Administration cargo ship was the 632nd ship built. The ship is named for the city of Morgantown, West Virginia. Her keel was laid on 12 December 1944. She was launched on 5 February 1945 and completed on 28 February 1945. The 10,600-ton ship was constructed for the Maritime Commission. The States Marine Line operated her under the United States Merchant Marine act for the War Shipping Administration.

Victory ships were designed to supersede the earlier Liberty Ships. Unlike Liberty ships, Victory ships were designed to serve the US Navy after the war and also last longer. The Victory ship differed from a Liberty ship in that they were: faster, longer and wider, taller, and had a thinner stack set farther toward the superstructure. They also had a long raised forecastle.

== World War II ==
On Wednesday 11 April 1945 at 1:15am the Morgantown Victory hit a mine at 49°46′00″N 0°21′00″W while joining convoy VWP 21, north of Le Havre, France. She had departed a path that had been swept of mines for the convoy. The mine hit the port side at cargo hold #5. This damaged the ship's generators. No one was killed and only three crew were injured. She had a load of cargo, including 386 tons of Army mail. Life boats were readied, but were not needed. The ship was towed to Le Havre by a Navy tug. On April 30 she was towed to Antwerp, Belgium and repaired in dry dock.

== War relief and Seacowboys ==
In 1946 after World War II, Morgantown Victory was converted to a livestock ship, also called a cowboy ship. From 1945 to 1947 the United Nations Relief and Rehabilitation Administration and the Brethren Service Committee of the Church of the Brethren sent livestock to war-torn countries. These "seagoing cowboys" volunteers made about 360 trips on 73 different ships. The Heifers for Relief project was started by the Church of the Brethren in 1942; in 1953 this became Heifer International. Morgantown Victory made six trips to deliver livestock to war worn nations in Europe. Morgantown Victory delivered livestock to Gdańsk, Poland in December 1945. There were problems loading Morgantown Victory for her first trip to Poland. The US port was not equipped to load horses, it took three days to load. They arrived in Poland on Christmas Eve of 1945. The Polish port city of Gdańsk-Danzig was just flat after the war. Unloading the horses, took a long time also, the ship was still in Gdańsk-Danzig for New Year's Eve a week later. Departing Poland she ran into thick fog and then ran aground near Sweden. She was able to get underway four days later. Morgantown Victory delivered poultry chicks to Poland in May 1946. She made three more trips to Poland in April 1946, July 1946 and January 1947.

"Thirty-two cowboys back at sea, getting homesick as they could be, spent Christmas Day out on the deep, and dreamt of home while fast asleep." this was written by 23 year old Willard Bontrager who titled it “An Ode to Thirty-two Cowboys,”. Willard gave the poem to his crew at their Christmas program on December 25, 1946, at sea. Willard and the crew delivered 750 horses to Yugoslavia in December 1946.

After her war relief efforts in 1949, she was laid up at Suisun Bay as part of the National Defense Reserve Fleet.

== Korean War ==
Morgantown Victory served as a merchant marine ship supplying goods for the Korean War. About 75 percent of the personnel serving in the Korean War were delivered by the merchant marine ships. Morgantown Victory transported goods, mail, food, and other supplies. About 90 percent of the cargo was moved by merchant marine ships to the war zone. Morgantown Victory made trips between 1951 and 1952. Morgantown Victory serviced in the Inchon-Seoul Operation, App E, Task Organization of Joint Task Force Seven.

== Vietnam War ==
In 1966 she was reactivated for the Vietnam War. She was operated by the Pacific Far East Line.

== Retired ==
In 1973 she was again laid up in Barn Bay. In 1984 she was taken to Port of Kaohsiung and scrapped.

== See also ==
- List of Victory ships
- Liberty ship
- Type C1 ship
- Type C2 ship
- Type C3 ship

== Sources ==
- Sawyer, L.A. and W.H. Mitchell. Victory ships and tankers: The history of the ‘Victory’ type cargo ships and the tankers built in the United States of America during World War II, Cornell Maritime Press, 1974, 0-87033-182-5.
- United States Maritime Commission:
- Victory Cargo Ships
