= SS Mercer Victory =

Victory ship of the United States

- Typical Victory Ship

History

United States
- Name: SS Mercer Victory
- Namesake: Mercer University
- Owner: War Shipping Administration
- Operator: State Marine Lines
- Builder: Permanente Metals Yard No. 1, Richmond, California
- Laid down: 26 January 1945
- Launched: 14 March 1945
- Completed: April 11, 1945
- Identification: IMO number: 5232373
- Fate: Scrapped Kaohsiung in 1988.

General characteristics
- Tonnage: 7,725 GRT
- Length: 139 m (456 ft)
- Beam: 18.9 m (62 ft)
- Draft: 7 m (23 ft)
- Propulsion: Westinghouse steam turbines, single shaft, 8500 horsepower (6.3 MW)
- Speed: 17.5 knots (32.4 km/h) maximum sustained, 21 knots emergency
- Range: 12,500 nm at 12 knots
- Complement: 62 Merchant Marine and 28 US Naval Armed Guards as Victory ship.*358 officers and men
- Armament: 1 × 5 inch (127 mm)/38 caliber gun as As Victory Ship; 1 × 3 inch (76 mm)/50 caliber gun; 8 × 20 mm Oerlikon
- Aircraft carried: none
- Aviation facilities: none

SS Mercer Victory was a Boulder Victory-class cargo ship built for World War II. Mercer Victory, a Victory ship, was launched 14 March 1945 by Permanente Metals Corporation, Richmond, California and operated by the States Marine Line. At the ceremonial ship launching, Mercer University President Spright Dowell said the SS Mercer Victory should strive: “to do her full-part for the national defense” and “to study a plan for after war conditions and needs.”

== World War II ==
The SS Mercer Victory had the dangerous job of delivering goods for troops in the Pacific War during World War II. On SS Mercer Victory loaded with 6,000 pounds of goods and traveled to Okinawa for the Battle of Okinawa from 1 April until 22 June 1945.. Simmons Victory loaded up on supplies to prepare for the Operation Downfall the Invasion of Japan.

After the war she was laid up Wilmington, California in a reserve in 1946 and operated by Luckenbach Steamship Co. Inc.

== War Relief and Seacowboys ==
In 1946 after World War II the Mercer Victory was converted to a livestock ship, also called a cowboy ship. From 1945 to 1947 the United Nations Relief and Rehabilitation Administration and the Brethren Service Committee of the Church of the Brethren sent livestock to war-torn countries. These "seagoing cowboys" made about 360 trips on 73 different ships. The Heifers for Relief project was started by the Church of the Brethren in 1942; in 1953 this became Heifer International. The SS Mercer Victory was one of these ships, known as cowboy ships, as she moved livestock across the Atlantic Ocean. In two trip she took 780 horses, several thousand baby chicks and hay bales to Poland on each trip. Mercer Victory moved horses, heifers, and mules as well as some chicks, rabbits, and goats. In 1948 with her war and relief work done she was laid up in the Wilmington, North Carolina as part of the National Defense Reserve Fleet.

== Post-war ==
In 1966 she was set to be reactivated for Vietnam War, but the order was cancelled 1 February 1966. In 1973 she was laid up Suisun Bay in the National Defense Reserve Fleet. In 1988 she was scrapped at Kaohsiung, Taiwan.

== USNS Havenford ==
USNS Havenford (T-AG-179) was one of 12 ships scheduled to be acquired by the United States Navy in February 1966 and converted into Forward Depot Ships and placed into service with the Military Sea Transport Service, The Mercer Victory (MCV-591) was chosen for this conversion and assigned the name Havenford but the program was canceled and the ships were not acquired by the Navy.

== Honors ==
Crew of Naval Armed Guard on the SS Logan Victory' earned "Battle Stars" in World War II for war action during the assault occupation of Okinawa from 8 June 1945 to 20 June 1945. She used her deck guns to defend herself and other ship in action.

== See also ==
- List of Victory ships
- Liberty ship
- Type C1 ship
- Type C2 ship
- Type C3 ship
