= USS Marathon (APA-200) =

1944 attack transport in United States Navy

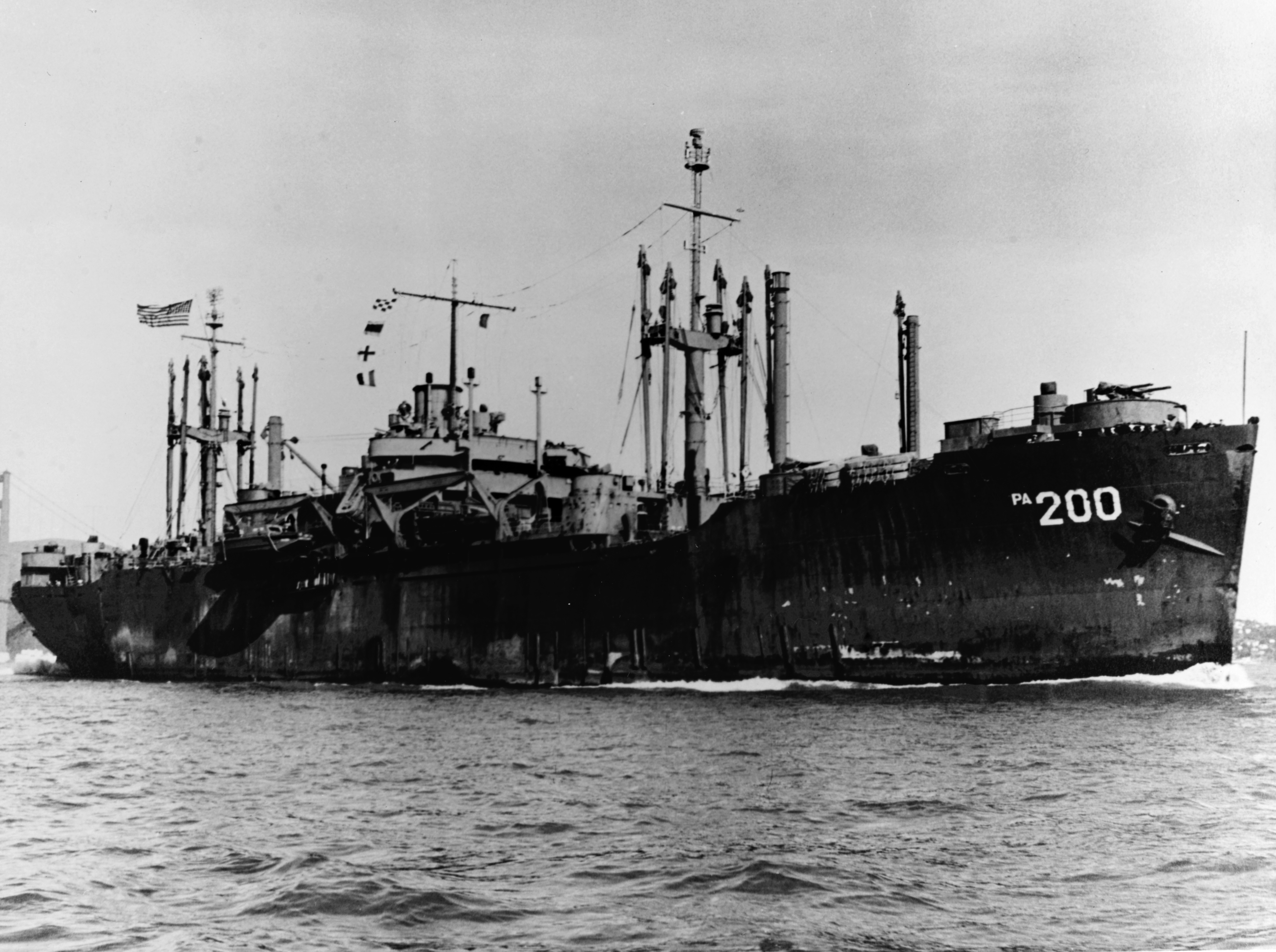
- Marathon underway in San Francisco Bay, California (USA), circa 1945-1946

History

United States
- Name: USS Marathon
- Namesake: Marathon County, Wisconsin
- Ordered: as type VC2-S-AP5; MCV hull 668
- Laid down: 4 July 1944
- Launched: 7 October 1944
- Acquired: 27 October 1944
- Commissioned: 28 October 1944
- Decommissioned: 8 May 1946
- Stricken: 8 May 1946
- Fate: Returned to owners, 8 May 1946

General characteristics
- Displacement: 14,833 (full load)
- Length: 455 ft 0 in (138.68 m)
- Beam: 62 ft 0 in (18.90 m)
- Draft: 28 ft 1 in (8.56 m)
- Speed: 17 knots
- Boats & landing craft carried: two LCM, twelve LCVP, three LCPU
- Capacity: 150,000 cu. ft, 2,900 tons
- Complement: 56 Officers 480 Enlisted
- Armament: one 5 in (130 mm) gun mount, twelve 40 mm gun mounts, ten 20 mm gun mounts

USS Marathon (APA-200) was a Haskell-class attack transport acquired by the U.S. Navy during World War II for the task of transporting troops to and from combat areas.

Marathon (APA 200), built under Maritime Commission contract, was laid down by the Kaiser Shipbuilding Co., Vancouver, Washington; launched 7 October 1944; sponsored by Mrs. E. L. Greene; acquired by the Navy on loan charter 27 October 1944; and commissioned 28 October 1944.

== World War II service ==
Following shakedown exercises, Marathon underwent amphibious training operations off the southern California coast and in the Hawaiian Islands. On 24 January 1945, she departed Pearl Harbor, with army, marine, and naval passengers, and steamed independently for Espiritu Santo and Guadalcanal. She arrived in the New Hebrides 2 February, disembarked her army passengers and general cargo and continued on to the Solomons, arriving at Guadalcanal on the 7th. At the end of the month, the transport commenced a period of intensive amphibious exercises in preparation for the upcoming Okinawa campaign.

On 22 March she got underway for Ulithi, conducting gunnery drills en route, and 27 March sailed with the fleet for the Ryukyus. Just before dawn, 1 April, Marathon began dispatching her boats toward the beaches. Commencing with smoke boats, she continued unloading troops and cargo into the afternoon. losing only one of her landing craft, with no casualties, to enemy fire.

The transport remained in the assault zone until 5 April when she headed for the Marianas. From Saipan, she returned to Pearl Harbor, arriving on the 20th for maintenance. Following training, Marathon called at San Francisco, California, to embark troops bound for Hawaii. She returned to Pearl Harbor 8 June and headed for the western Pacific Ocean 2 days later, steaming via Eniwetok and Ulithi, for Okinawa. Marathon reached that island 14 July and proceeded into newly named Buckner Bay, where she discharged passengers and cargo.

On 22 July, while at anchor in Buckner Bay Marathon’s hull trembled with a force of a violent explosion. Postwar examination of Japanese records indicates that the explosion, which resulted in extensive damage, was caused by a kaiten, a one-man suicide Japanese submarine.

== Post-war activity ==
Following prolonged repairs, on 16 September Marathon sailed to Nagasaki to embark ex-prisoners of war of varying nationality for transport to Okinawa. From October to February she swept minefields in the Nagoya, Hiro Wan, and Ise Wan areas.

Marathon headed for the United States in late February 1946. She decommissioned and returned to her owners at San Francisco 8 May.

Marathon received two battle stars for World War II service at Okinawa.
