= USS McCracken =

U.S. Navy transport

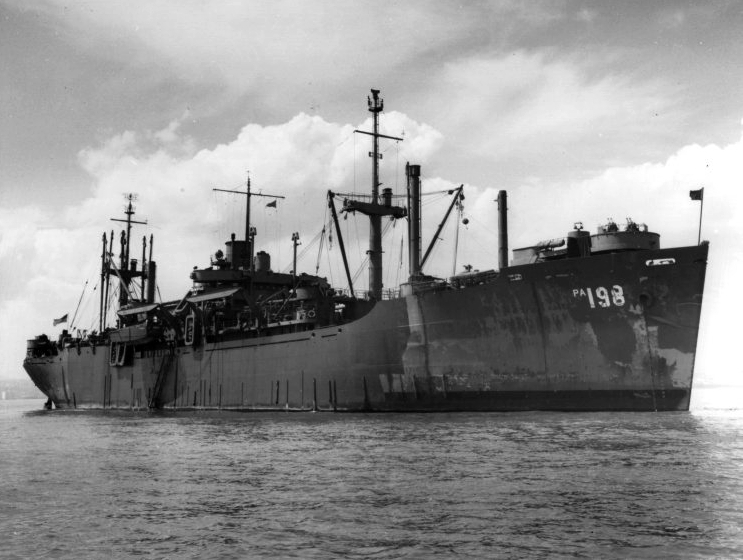
- McCracken at anchor in San Francisco Bay, circa 1946.

History

United States
- Name: USS McCracken
- Namesake: McCracken County, Kentucky
- Ordered: as type VC2-S-AP5
- Laid down: 8 June 1944
- Launched: 29 September 1944
- Acquired: 21 October 1944
- Commissioned: 21 October 1944
- Decommissioned: 10 October 1946
- Stricken: 1 October 1958
- Fate: Scrapped, 1975

General characteristics
- Displacement: 14,833 (full load)
- Length: 455 ft 0 in (138.68 m)
- Beam: 62 ft 0 in (18.90 m)
- Draught: 28 ft 1 in (8.56 m)
- Speed: 17 knots
- Boats & landing craft carried: two LCM, twelve LCVP, three LCPU
- Capacity: 150,000 cu. ft, 2,900 tons
- Complement: 56 Officers 480 Enlisted
- Armament: one 5 in (130 mm) gun mount, twelve 40 mm gun mounts, ten 20 mm gun mounts

USS McCracken (APA-198) was a Haskell-class attack transport acquired by the U.S. Navy during World War II for the task of transporting troops to and from combat areas.

== World War II service ==
McCracken (APA 198) was laid down as a Victory ships under United States Maritime Commission contract by Kaiser Shipbuilding Co., Inc., Vancouver, Washington, 8 June 1944; launched 29 September 1944; sponsored by Mrs. Albert Bauer; acquired by the Navy 21 October 1944; and commissioned at Astoria, Oregon, 21 October 1944.

After shakedown and training along the U.S. West Coast, McCracken embarked troops at San Pedro, Los Angeles, and sailed for Pearl Harbor 27 December. Arriving there 2 January 1945, she departed for the South Pacific Ocean 10 January. Carrying troops and cargo, she reached Nouméa, New Caledonia, 20 January. Thence between 26 and 31 January, she steamed via the Russell Islands to Guadalcanal, Solomons, where she began 6 weeks of intensive training. Assigned to TransDiv 52, she departed Guadalcanal 15 March and steamed for the invasion of Okinawa.

=== Landing troops and their equipment on Okinawa ===
After touching at Ulithi, Caroline Islands, McCracken closed the beaches off Okinawa early 1 April and debarked assault troops shortly after sunrise. During the day she off loaded cargo despite enemy air attacks. She remained off Okinawa until 6 April, but heavy weather prevented her from discharging troops and cargo.

=== Disembarking troops on Saipan and Okinawa ===
Between 6 and 10 April McCracken steamed to Saipan and debarked her remaining troops. Departing 11 April, she arrived Pearl Harbor the 22d. On 5 May she sailed to San Francisco, California, embarked troops and cargo, and returned to Pearl Harbor 26 May. Three days later she sailed westward carrying Navy Seabees and Army Engineers, arriving Buckner Bay, Okinawa, 5 July. After discharging men and supplies, she embarked elements of the 6th Marine Division at Hagushi 9 July, and from 10 to 16 July transported them to Guam.

=== Landing troops in the Philippine Islands ===
McCracken sailed for the U.S. west coast 17 July, arriving San Francisco the 30th. She loaded dry provisions there; embarked more than 1,400 Army troops at San Pedro, Los Angeles; and departed 16 August, arriving Manila 12 September to debark troops. A week later she began embarking troops of the 25th Infantry Division at Lingayen Gulf, and on 1 October she sailed in convoy to carry occupation troops to Japan.

=== End-of-war operations ===
McCracken reached Nagoya, Honshū, 28 October and landed occupation troops. Between 4 and 8 November the transport sailed via Yokosuka to Sasebo, Kyūshū, where she embarked 760 sailors. After embarking 737 additional Navy veterans at Nagasaki, she departed for the United States 13 November and reached San Pedro 1 December. Sailing for a second "Operation Magic Carpet" cruise 12 December, McCracken arrived Manila Bay 2 January 1946, boarded veteran troops, sailed 6 January and arrived Los Angeles, California, the 25th.

== End-of-war decommissioning and inactivation ==
McCracken arrived San Francisco 10 March, began inactivation overhaul at Mare Island, California, 2 April, and decommissioned at Stockton, California, 10 October 1946, entering the Pacific Reserve Fleet. She was transferred to the Mare Island Group 17 June 1949; reassigned to the Stockton Group 28 November 1950; and assigned to the San Diego Group 30 March 1958. Authorized for transfer to the Maritime Administration 5 September 1958, her name was struck from the Navy List 1 October 1958. Into 1969 she remained berthed with the National Defense Reserve Fleet in Suisun Bay, California. In 1975 she was scrapped in Portland, Oregon.

== Military awards and honors ==
McCracken received one battle star for World War II service.
