= Utö Lighthouse =

Utö Lighthouse Utö
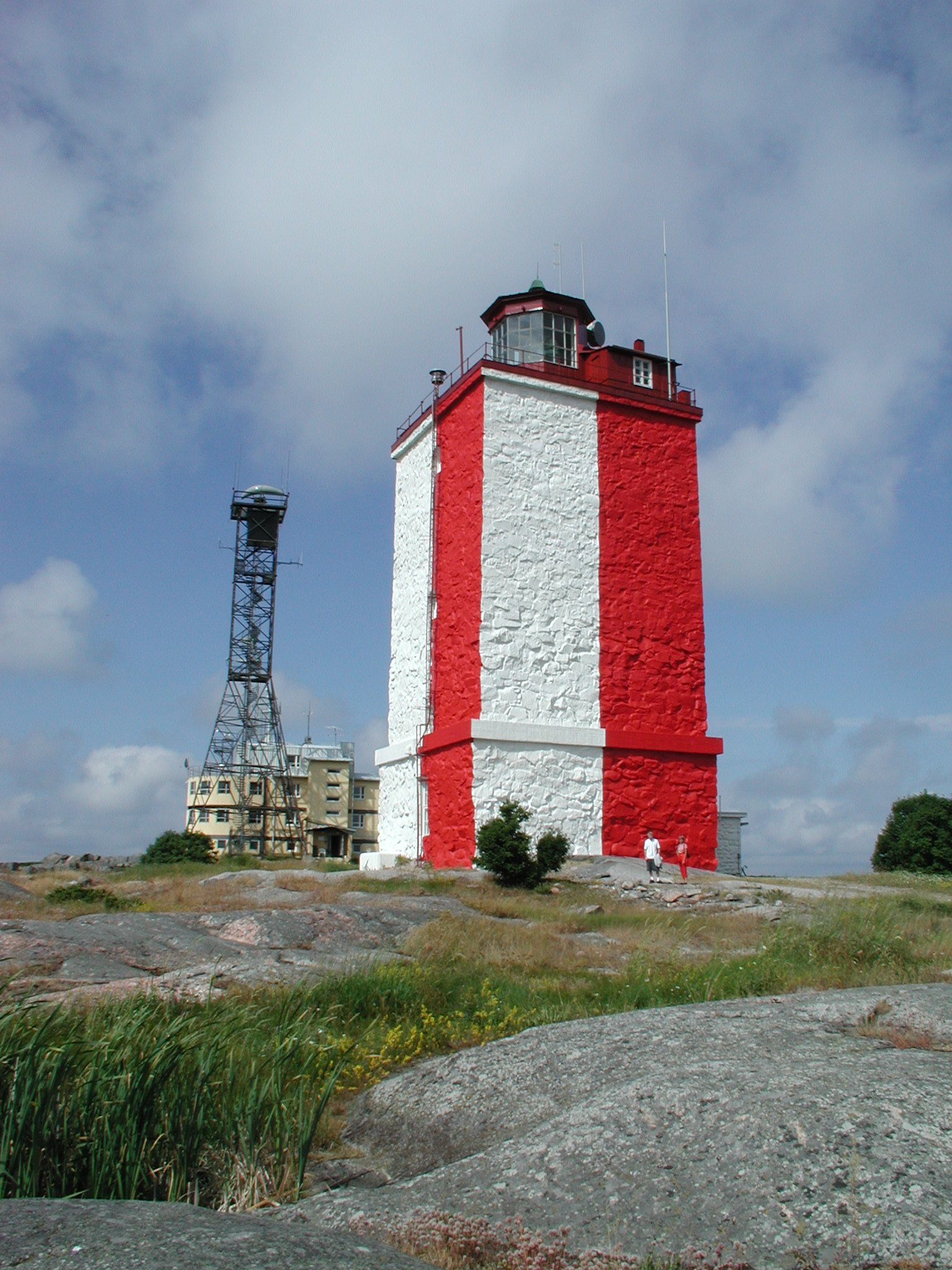
- Location: Utö, Pargas, Finland
- Coordinates: 59.780947°N 21.368122°E

Tower
- Constructed: 1753 (first)
- Construction: granite
- Automated: 1986
- Height: 24 metres (79 ft)
- Shape: square tower
- Markings: white and red vertical stripe on each side, red lantern, green lantern dome
- Power source: candle, hemp oil, kerosene, diesel generator
- Heritage: local heritage site

Light
- First lit: 1814 (current)
- Focal height: 40 metres (130 ft)
- Lens: parabolic reflector (–1881), first order Fresnel lens (1906–)
- Range: 17.8 nmi (33.0 km; 20.5 mi)
- Characteristic: Fl (2) W 12s.

The Utö Lighthouse is located on the island of Utö, in Pargas municipality, Finland. The 24-metre-high (79 ft) tower is situated on the island's summit. After the original round lighthouse (Finland's first lighthouse) was destroyed during the Russo-Swedish Wars of 1808–09, the present structure was constructed in 1814, with the present lens installed in 1906.

The lighthouse is painted as the signal flag H (Hotel), as the island has a maritime pilot station. Likewise, the light signal of the lighthouse is four short flashes (....) as Morse code letter 'H'.
