= Kiri =

Kiri may refer to:

== People ==
- Kiri (given name), a given name (and list of people with the name)
- Kiri Te Kanawa (born 1944), New Zealand soprano
- Riku Kiri (born 1963), Finnish weight lifter
- Solomon Kiri (fl. 1990s), New Zealand rugby player

== Places ==
- Kiri, Democratic Republic of the Congo, a community in Bandundu Province
- Kiri Territory, Bandundu Province, Democratic Republic of the Congo

== Other uses ==
- Japanese ship Kiri, several ships
- Kiri (TV series), British television drama series
- Kiri Airport
- Breuvages Kiri, an independent bottler of soft drinks
- Paulownia tomentosa, a tree
- Kiri, a brand of cheese by Bel Group
- "Kiri", a song by Monoral

== See also ==
- Kiri Noh, a category of Noh
- Government Seal of Japan
