= USS Sausalito =

Tacoma-class patrol frigate

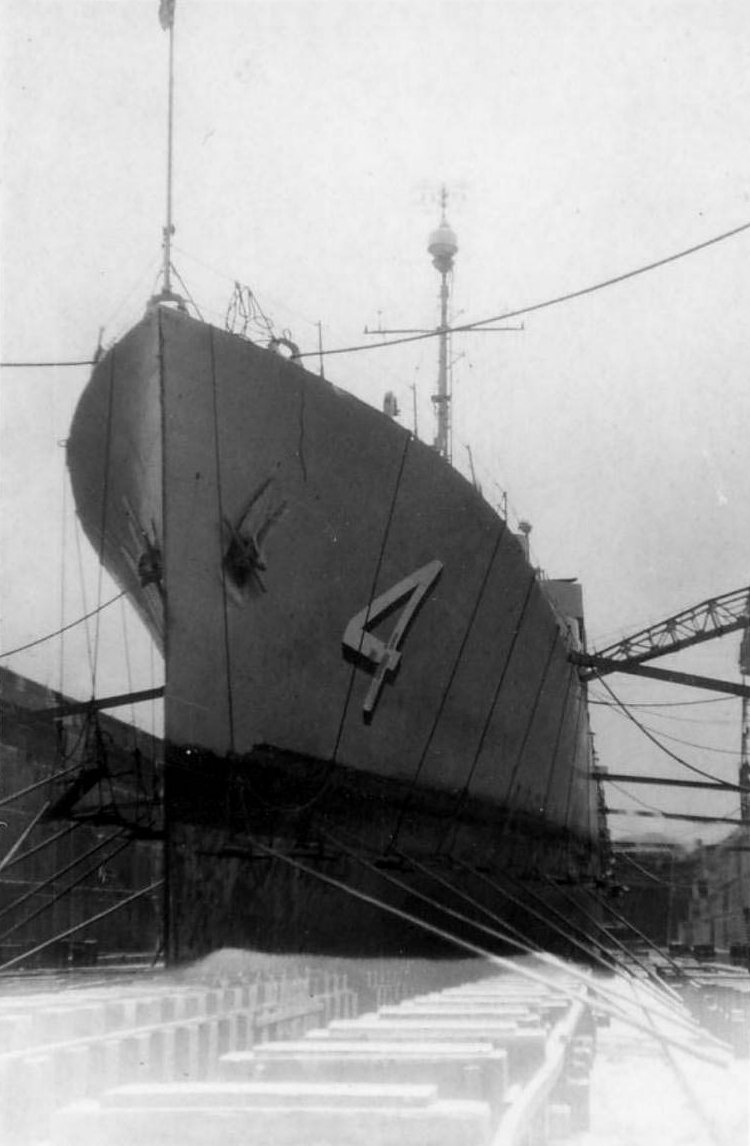
- USS Sausalito (PF-4), bow view, taken in dry dock while she was being prepared for transfer to the Republic of Korea, c. 1952, Yokosuka, Japan.

History

United States
- Name: Sausalito
- Namesake: City of Sausalito, California
- Ordered: as a Type S2-S2-AQ1 hull, MCE hull 1422
- Builder: Permanente Metals Richmond Shipyard #4, Richmond, California
- Yard number: 47
- Laid down: 7 April 1943
- Reclassified: Patrol Frigate (PF), 15 April 1943
- Launched: 20 July 1943
- Sponsored by: Mrs. Richard Shaler
- Commissioned: 4 March 1944
- Decommissioned: 16 August 1945
- Identification: Hull symbol: PG-112; Hull symbol: PF-4; Call sign: NYQG
- Fate: Transferred to Soviet Navy, 16 August 1945
- Stricken: 1 September 1972

Soviet Union
- Name: EK-16
- Acquired: 16 August 1945
- Commissioned: 16 August 1945 (Note: According to Project Hula: Secret Soviet-American Cooperation in the War Against Japan, which includes access to Soviet-era records unavailable during the Cold War, Project Hula ships were commissioned into the Soviet Navy simultaneously with their transfer from the US Navy; see photo captions on p. 24 regarding the transfers of various large infantry landing craft (LCI(L)s) and information on p. 27 about the transfer of USS Coronado (PF-38), which Russell says typified the transfer process. As sources, Russell cites Department of the Navy, Ships Data: U.S. Naval Vessels Volume II, 1 January 1949, (NAVSHIPS 250-012), Washington, DC: Bureau of Ships, 1949; and Berezhnoi, S. S., Flot SSSR: Korabli i suda lendliza: Spravochnik ("The Soviet Navy: Lend-Lease Ships and Vessels: A Reference"), St. Petersburg, Russia: Belen, 1994.)
- Decommissioned: 1 November 1949
- Fate: Returned to United States, 1 November 1949

United States
- Name: Sausalito
- Acquired: Returned by Soviet Navy, 1 November 1949
- Recommissioned: 15 September 1950
- Decommissioned: 9 June 1952
- Honors and awards: 6 battle stars, Korean War
- Fate: Transferred to Republic of Korea Navy, 4 September 1952
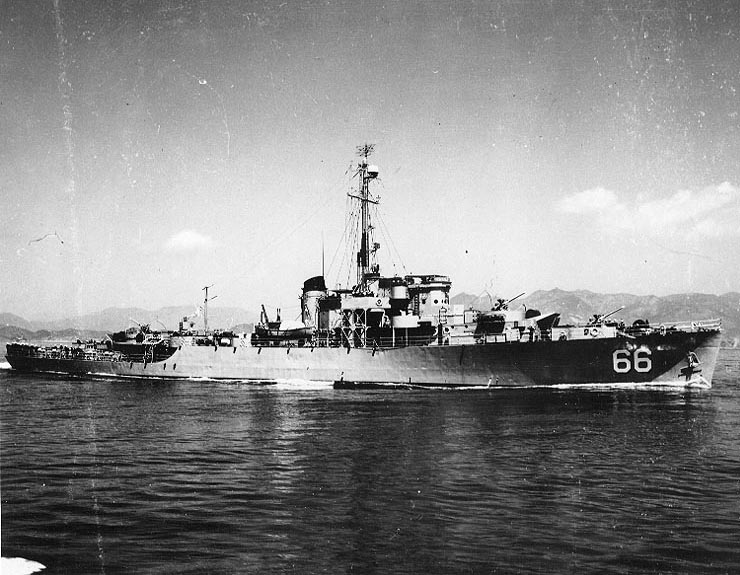
- South Korean frigate ROKS Imchin (PF-66), the former USS Sausalito (PF-4)

South Korea
- Name: Imchin
- Acquired: 4 September 1952
- Identification: Hull symbol: PF-66
- Fate: Scrapped 1973

General characteristics
- Class & type: Tacoma-class frigate patrol frigates
- Displacement: 1,430 long tons (1,450 t) (light load); 2,415 long tons (2,454 t) (full load)
- Length: 303 ft 11 in (92.63 m)
- Beam: 37 ft 6 in (11.43 m)
- Draft: 13 ft 8 in (4.17 m)
- Installed power: 2 × 3-Drum express boilers , 240 psi (1,700 kPa); 5,500 ihp (4,100 kW)
- Propulsion: 2 × Vertical triple-expansion steam engine; 2 × shafts
- Speed: 20.3 kn (37.6 km/h; 23.4 mph)
- Complement: 190
- Armament: 3 × 3 in (76 mm)/50 caliber dual-purpose (DP) gun; 2 × twin 40 mm (1.57 in) Bofors anti-aircraft (AA) gun mounts; 9 × 20 mm (0.79 in) Oerlikon cannon AA gun mounts; 2 × Depth charge tracks; 8 × Depth charge projectors; 1 × Hedgehog

USS Sausalito (PF-4), was a Tacoma-class patrol frigate in commission from 1944 to 1945 and from 1950 to 1952, was the only ship of the United States Navy to be named for Sausalito, California. She also served in the Soviet Navy as EK-16 and in the Republic of Korea Navy as ROKS Imchin (PF-66).

== Construction and commissioning ==
Sausalito was laid down on 7 April 1943, as a patrol gunboat, PG-112, under a Maritime Commission (MARCOM) contract, MC hull No. 1422, at Permanente Metals Richmond Shipyard #4, Richmond, California; reclassified as a patrol frigate, PF-4, on 15 April 1943, she was launched on 20 July 1943, sponsored by Mrs. Richard Shaler, and commissioned on 4 March 1944.

== Service history ==
=== U.S. Navy, World War II, 1944–1945 ===
After shakedown, Sausalito arrived at Adak, Territory of Alaska, on 5 October 1944 for convoy escort duty in the Alaskan Sea Frontier. She performed these duties until – having been selected for transfer to the Soviet Navy in Project Hula, a secret program for the transfer of US Navy ships to the Soviet Navy at Cold Bay, Alaska, in anticipation of the Soviet Union joining the war against Japan – she departed on 5 June 1945, for overhaul at Seattle, Washington, to prepare her for transfer. She then proceeded to Cold Bay and began training her new Soviet crew.

=== Soviet Navy, 1945–1949 ===
Following the completion of training for her Soviet crew, Sausalito was decommissioned on 16 August 1945, at Cold Bay, and transferred to the Soviet Union, under Lend-Lease immediately along with her sister ships Tacoma (PF-3), Hoquiam (PF-5), Pasco (PF-6), Albuquerque (PF-7), and Everett (PF-8). Commissioned into the Soviet Navy immediately, Sausalito was designated as a storozhevoi korabl ("escort ship") and renamed EK-16 in Soviet service. She soon departed Cold Bay, bound for Petropavlovsk-Kamchatsky, in the Soviet Union, and served as a patrol vessel in the Soviet Far East.

In February 1946, the United States began negotiations for the return of ships loaned to the Soviet Union for use during World War II. On 8 May 1947, United States Secretary of the Navy James V. Forrestal informed the United States Department of State that the United States Department of the Navy wanted 480 of the 585 combatant ships it had transferred to the Soviet Union for World War II use returned, EK-16 among them. Negotiations for the return of the ships were protracted, but on 1 November 1949 the Soviet Union finally returned EK-16 to the US Navy at Yokosuka, Japan.

=== U.S. Navy, Korean War, 1950–1952 ===
Reverting to her original name, Sausalito was placed in reserve at Yokosuka. With the outbreak of the Korean War on 25 June 1950, the U.S. Navy needed additional escort vessels, and on 15 September 1950, Sausalito was recommissioned at Yokosuka. On 26 November 1950, she departed Yokosuka for Hŭngnam, North Korea. There, until 24 December 1950, she performed harbor control duties, which included escorting ships through the mineswept channel, passing instructions to ships entering the harbor, patrolling the entrance against hostile craft and drifting naval mines, and conducting shore bombardment when required.

Between February and May 1951, Sausalito's assignments included escorting the battleship Missouri on her shore bombardment station, blockade patrols, shore bombardment on the east coast of North Korea from Wonsan to Chongjin, and harbor control duty at Wonsan, broken by periods of upkeep at Sasebo and Yokosuka, Japan. Between June and August 1951, she escorted underway replenishment groups off the Korean coast.

After drydocking and upkeep at Yokosuka, Sausalito departed for the Philippine Islands, in October 1951. In late November and early December 1951, she conducted a patrol against unauthorized fishing vessels in the Sonsorol Islands, in the western Caroline Islands, apprehending one vessel. After spending Christmas 1951, in Subic Bay, on Luzon, she made a good-will tour to Saigon, South Vietnam; Bangkok, Thailand; Singapore; and Penang, Federation of Malaya. February 1952, found her back in Korean waters, where she resumed escort and patrol duties before returning to Yokosuka, for the last time under the United States flag on 31 May 1952. The US Navy decommissioned Sausalito on 9 June 1952.

=== Republic of Korea Navy, 1952–1973 ===
On 4 September 1952, the United States transferred the ship, on loan, to the Republic of Korea for service in the Republic of Korea Navy as ROKS Imchin (PF-66). She replaced another Tacoma-class patrol frigate, the South Korean ship ROKS Apnok, ex-USS Rockford (PF-48), which had been irreparably damaged in a collision on 21 May 1951.

Imchin was scrapped in 1973.

== Awards ==
The US Navy awarded Sausalito six battle stars for her Korean War service.

== Bibliography ==
- "Sausalito". Dictionary of American Naval Fighting Ships. Naval History and Heritage Command. This article incorporates text from this source, which is in the public domain.
- "Kaiser Permanente No. 4, Richmond CA". ShipbuildingHistory.com. 5 February 2014.
- "Sausalito (PF 4)". NavSource.
- Russell, Richard A. (1997). Project Hula: Secret Soviet-American Cooperation in the War Against Japan. Washington, D.C.: Naval Historical Center. ISBN 0-945274-35-1.
