= USS Hoquiam =

Tacoma-class patrol frigate

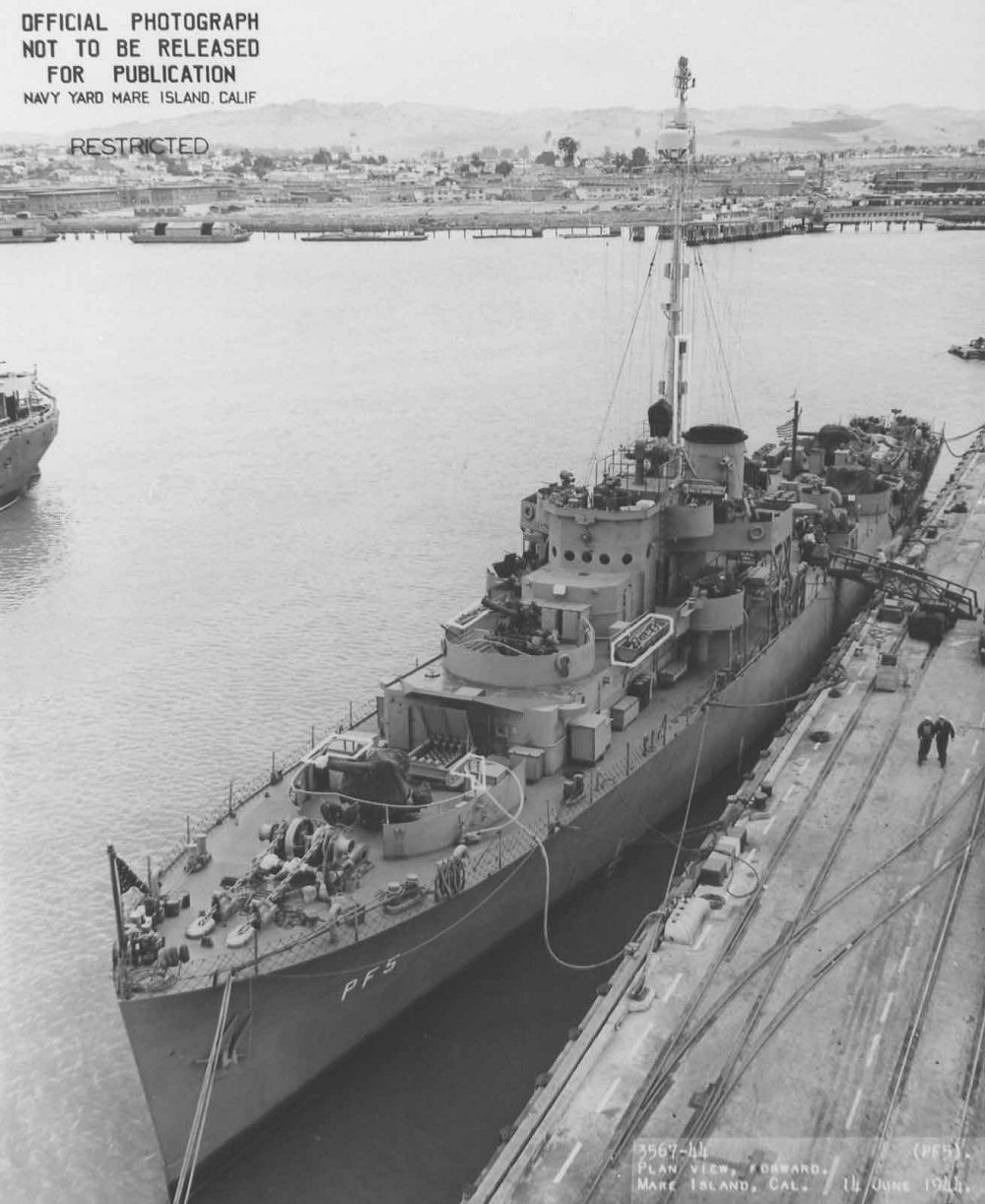
- USS Hoquiam at Mare Island Navy Yard, Vallejo, California, on 14 June 1944.

History

United States
- Name: Hoquiam
- Namesake: City of Hoquiam, Washington
- Ordered: as a Type S2-S2-AQ1 hull, MCE hull 1423
- Builder: Permanente Metals Richmond Shipyard #4, Richmond, California
- Yard number: 48
- Laid down: 10 April 1943
- Reclassified: Patrol Frigate (PF), 15 April 1943
- Launched: 31 July 1943
- Sponsored by: Miss Helen Philbrick
- Commissioned: 8 May 1944
- Decommissioned: 16 August 1945
- Identification: Hull symbol: PG-113; Hull symbol: PF-5; Call sign: NZCY
- Fate: Transferred to Soviet Navy, 16 August 1945

Soviet Union
- Name: EK-13 (Note: The Dictionary of American Naval Fighting Ships Hoquaim, article states that Hoquaiam was named EK-14 in Soviet service and NavSource Online: Frigate Photo Archive Hoquaim (PF 5) ex-PG-113, repeats this, but Project Hula: Secret Soviet-American Cooperation in the War Against Japan, which includes access to Soviet-era records unavailable during the Cold War, reports that the ship's Soviet name was EK-13. As sources, Russell cites Department of the Navy, Ships Data: U.S. Naval Vessels Volume II, 1 January 1949, (NAVSHIPS 250-012), Washington, DC: Bureau of Ships, 1949; and Berezhnoi, S. S., Flot SSSR: Korabli i suda lendliza: Spravochnik ("The Soviet Navy: Lend-Lease Ships and Vessels: A Reference"), St. Petersburg, Russia: Belen, 1994.)
- Acquired: 16 August 1945
- Commissioned: 16 August 1945 (Note: According to Project Hula: Secret Soviet-American Cooperation in the War Against Japan, which includes access to Soviet-era records unavailable during the Cold War, Project Hula ships were commissioned into the Soviet Navy simultaneously with their transfer from the US Navy; see photo captions on p. 24 regarding the transfers of various large infantry landing craft (LCI(L)s) and information on p. 27 about the transfer of Coronado (PF-38), which Russell says typified the transfer process. As sources, Russell cites Department of the Navy, Ships Data: U.S. Naval Vessels Volume II, 1 January 1949, (NAVSHIPS 250-012), Washington, DC: Bureau of Ships, 1949; and Berezhnoi, S. S., Flot SSSR: Korabli i suda lendliza: Spravochnik ("The Soviet Navy: Lend-Lease Ships and Vessels: A Reference"), St. Petersburg, Russia: Belen, 1994.)
- Decommissioned: 1 November 1949
- Fate: returned to United States, 1 November 1949

United States
- Name: Tacoma
- Acquired: 1 November 1949
- Recommissioned: 27 September 1950
- Decommissioned: 5 October 1951
- Stricken: 1 August 1972
- Honors and awards: 5 × battle stars for Korean War service
- Fate: transferred to Republic of Korea Navy, 6 October 1951

South Korea
- Name: Nae Tong
- Acquired: 6 October 1951
- Identification: Hull symbol: PF-65
- Fate: Scrapped, 1973

General characteristics
- Class & type: Tacoma-class patrol frigate
- Displacement: 1,430 long tons (1,450 t) (light load); 2,415 long tons (2,454 t) (full load)
- Length: 303 ft 11 in (92.63 m)
- Beam: 37 ft 6 in (11.43 m)
- Draft: 13 ft 8 in (4.17 m)
- Installed power: 2 × 3-Drum express boilers , 240 psi (1,700 kPa); 5,500 ihp (4,100 kW)
- Propulsion: 2 × Vertical triple-expansion steam engine; 2 × shafts
- Speed: 20.3 kn (37.6 km/h; 23.4 mph)
- Complement: 190
- Armament: 3 × 3 in (76 mm)/50 caliber dual-purpose (DP) gun; 2 × twin 40 mm (1.57 in) Bofors anti-aircraft (AA) gun mounts; 9 × 20 mm (0.79 in) Oerlikon cannon AA gun mounts; 2 × Depth charge tracks; 8 × Depth charge projectors; 1 × Hedgehog

USS Hoquiam (PG-113/PF-5), a Tacoma-class patrol frigate in commission from 1944 to 1945 and from 1950 to 1951, she is the only ship of the United States Navy to be named for Hoquiam, Washington. She also served in the Soviet Navy as EK-13 and in the Republic of Korea Navy as ROKS Nae Tong (PF-65).

== Construction and commissioning ==
Hoquiam was laid down under Maritime Commission (MARCOM) contract, MC hull No. 1423, by Permanente Metals Richmond Shipyard #4, Richmond, California, on 10 April 1943. as a patrol gunboat, PG-113, and was reclassified as a patrol frigate, PF-5, on 15 April 1943. Launched on 31 July 1943; sponsored by Miss Helen Philbrick; Hoquiam was commissioned on 8 May 1944, with Lieutenant Commander P. E. Trimble, USCG, in command.

== Service history ==
=== US Navy, World War II, 1944–1945 ===
After shakedown off the coast of Southern California, Hoquiam departed San Francisco, California, on 20 August 1944, called at Seattle, Washington, and arrived at Kodiak, Territory of Alaska, on 27 August 1944 for duty with the Alaskan Sea Frontier. On 8 March 1945, she became the second racially integrated American naval warship since the Civil War when Coast Guard Lieutenant Commander Carlton Skinner arrived to assume command accompanied by two black officers (one was LTJG Joseph C. Jenkins who he brought from the USS Sea Cloud) and thirty colored enlisted men.

Hoquiam patrolled island waters along the Alaskan coast until June 1945 when – having been selected for transfer to the Soviet Navy in Project Hula, a secret program for the transfer of U.S. Navy ships to the Soviet Navy at Cold Bay, Alaska, in anticipation of the Soviet Union joining the war against Japan – she returned to Seattle for an overhaul to prepare her for transfer. She then proceeded to Cold Bay and began training her new Soviet crew.

=== Soviet Navy, 1945–1949 ===
Following the completion of training for her Soviet crew, Hoquiam was decommissioned on 16 August 1945, at Cold Bay, and transferred to the Soviet Union under Lend-Lease immediately along with her sister ships Tacoma (PF-3), Sausalito (PF-4), Pasco (PF-6), Albuquerque (PF-7), and Everett (PF-8). Commissioned into the Soviet Navy immediately, Hoquiam was designated as a storozhevoi korabl ("escort ship") and renamed EK-13 in Soviet service. She soon departed Cold Bay bound for Petropavlovsk-Kamchatsky in the Soviet Union, where she served as a patrol vessel in the Soviet Far East.

In February 1946, the United States began negotiations for the return of ships loaned to the Soviet Union for use during World War II. On 8 May 1947, United States Secretary of the Navy James V. Forrestal informed the United States Department of State that the United States Department of the Navy wanted 480 of the 585 combatant ships it had transferred to the Soviet Union for World War II use returned, EK-13 among them. Negotiations for the return of the ships were protracted, but on 1 November 1949 the Soviet Union finally returned EK-13 to the U.S. Navy at Yokosuka, Japan.

=== U.S. Navy, Korean War, 1950–1951 ===
Reverting to her former name, Hoquiam lay idle in the Pacific Reserve Fleet at Yokosuka until the outbreak of the Korean War on 25 June 1950 created a need for more U.S. Navy escorts. She recommissioned on 27 September 1950 with Lieutenant Commander E. A. Lane in command. Following a brief shakedown, she departed to join United Nations naval forces in off Korea. Arriving off Wonsan on 25 October 1950, she served as a harbor control and screening ship during amphibious landings. For the next two months she performed patrol, escort, harbor control, and communications duties along the northeastern coast of Korea.

In late December 1950, Hoquiam assisted with harbor control operations during the evacuation at Hungnam before leaving for Japan. Arriving at Yokosuka on 30 December 1950, she underwent a brief overhaul, then served as a drone target ship off the coast of Japan from late January until early March 1951. She returned to Korean waters on 8 March 1951 and over the next six months operated along the east coast of Korea from Wonsan to Songjin. She participated in interdiction and harassment patrols designed to destroy enemy coastal shipping, conducted antisubmarine warfare operations off Wonsan, and bombarded enemy shore installations and coastal supply routes.

While engaging enemy shore positions on 7 May 1951, Hoquiam was damaged by gunfire. She returned to Japan, arriving at Yokosuka on 16 May 1951 for repairs. Following repairs, she departed on 4 June 1951, called at Sasebo, Japan, and then proceeded to Wonsan, where she arrived on 10 June 1951 to resume bombardment and interdiction duty. She continued patrolling the eastern coast of Korea until September 1951. After returning to Yokosuka on 9 September 1951, she was decommissioned on 5 October 1951.

=== Republic of Korea Navy, 1951–1973 ===
Upon decommissioning, the ship immediately was leased to the Republic of Korea, and the U.S. Navy eventually struck her name from the Naval Vessel Register on 1 August 1972. She served the Republic of Korea Navy as ROKS Nae Tong (PF-65) from 1951 until she was scrapped in 1973.

== Awards ==
The U.S. Navy awarded Hoquiam five battle stars for her Korean War service.

== Bibliography ==
- "Hoquiam (PF-5)". Dictionary of American Naval Fighting Ships. Naval History and Heritage Command. 20 July 2015. This article incorporates text from this source, which is in the public domain.
- "Kaiser Permanente No. 4, Richmond CA". ShipbuildingHistory.com. 5 February 2014.
- "Hoquiam (PF 5)". NavSource.
- Russell, Richard A. (1997). Project Hula: Secret Soviet-American Cooperation in the War Against Japan. Washington, D.C.: Naval Historical Center. ISBN 0-945274-35-1.
