= Japanese ship Kiri =

Several ships have been named Kiri (桐 / きり; "paulownia"):

- Japanese destroyer Kiri (1915), a Kaba-class destroyer of the Imperial Japanese Navy during World War I
- Japanese destroyer Kiri (1944), a Matsu-class destroyer of the Imperial Japanese Navy during World War II
- JDS Kiri (PF-291), a Kusu-class patrol frigate of the Japan Maritime Self-Defense Force, formerly USS Everett (PF-8)

== See also ==
- Kiri (disambiguation)
