= Japanese ship Tochi =

Two naval vessels of Japan have been named Tochi:

- Japanese destroyer Tochi, a Tachibana-class destroyer of the Imperial Japanese Navy during World War II, canceled in May 1945
- JDS Tochi (PF-16, PF-296), a Kusu-class patrol frigate of the Japan Maritime Self-Defense Force, formerly USS Albuquerque
