= Kiriko =

Kiriko may refer to:

== People ==
- Kiriko Isono (born 1964), Japanese comedian
- Kiriko Nananan (1972–2024), Japanese manga artist
- Kyary Pamyu Pamyu (Kiriko Takemura, born 1993), Japanese tarento, singer, and model

== Places ==
- Kiriko, Kenya, a settlement in Kenya
- Kirkos, also spelled Kirikos, a district in Addis Ababa, Ethiopia
- Kiriko Museum, a museum in Wajima, Ishikawa

== Other ==
- Kiriko (Overwatch), a video game character appearing in Overwatch 2 (2022)
  - Kiriko, a 2022 short film featuring the Overwatch character
- Satsuma kiriko, style of cut glass

== See also ==
- Kirino (disambiguation)
- Kiri (disambiguation)
