= USS Everett =

Tacoma-class patrol frigate

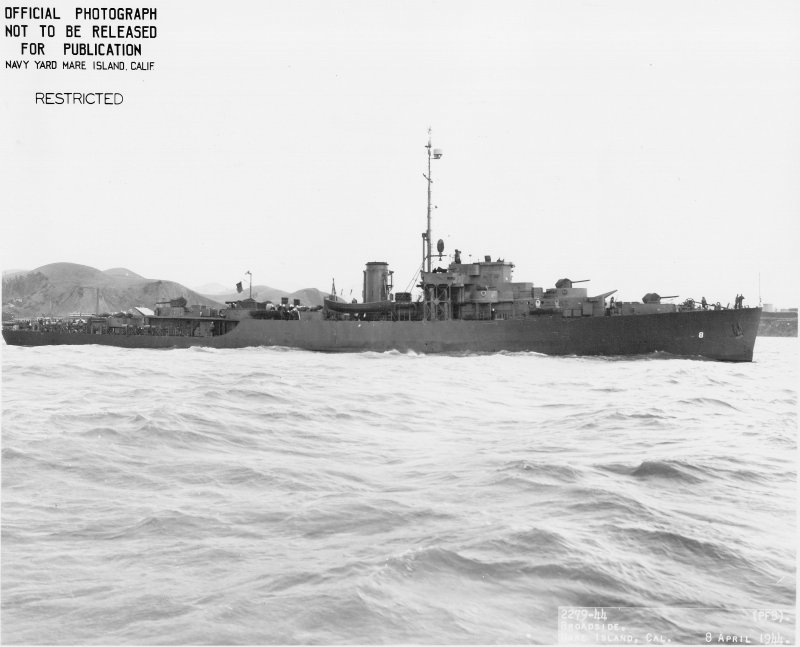
- USS Everett (PF-8)

History

United States
- Name: Everett
- Namesake: City of Everett, Washington
- Reclassified: Patrol Frigate (PF), 15 April 1943
- Ordered: as a Type S2-S2-AQ1 hull, MCE hull 1426
- Builder: Permanente Metals Richmond Shipyard #4, Richmond, California
- Yard number: 51
- Laid down: 31 July 1943
- Launched: 29 September 1943
- Sponsored by: Mrs. Cornelia M. Fitch
- Commissioned: 22 January 1944
- Decommissioned: 16 August 1945
- Stricken: 1 December 1961
- Identification: Hull symbol: PG-116; Hull symbol: PF-8; Call sign: NGBY
- Fate: Transferred to Soviet Navy 16 August 1945 (Note: NavSource Online: Frigate Photo Archive Everett (PF 8) ex-PG-116 states that Everett was transferred to the Soviet Navy on 17 August 1945, but the Dictionary of American Naval Fighting Ships Everett article states that Everett was transferred on 16 August 1945 and hazegray.org Everett repeats this. Russell, Richard A., Project Hula: Secret Soviet-American Cooperation in the War Against Japan, Washington, D.C.: Naval Historical Center, 1997, ISBN 0-945274-35-1, p. 39, which includes access to Soviet-era records unavailable during the Cold War, also reports that the transfer date was 16 August 1945. As sources, Russell cites Department of the Navy, Ships Data: U.S. Naval Vessels Volume II, 1 January 1949, (NAVSHIPS 250-012), Washington, DC: Bureau of Ships, 1949; and Berezhnoi, S. S., Flot SSSR: Korabli i suda lendliza: Spravochnik ("The Soviet Navy: Lend-Lease Ships and Vessels: A Reference"), St. Petersburg, Russia: Belen, 1994.)

Soviet Union
- Name: EK-15 (Note: NavSource Online: Frigate Photo Archive Everett (PF 8) ex-PG-116 states that Everett was named EK-17 in Soviet service, but Russell, Richard A., Project Hula: Secret Soviet-American Cooperation in the War Against Japan, Washington, D.C.: Naval Historical Center, 1997, ISBN 0-945274-35-1, p. 39, which includes access to Soviet-era records unavailable during the Cold War, reports that the ship's Soviet name was EK-15. As sources, Russell cites Department of the Navy, Ships Data: U.S. Naval Vessels Volume II, 1 January 1949, (NAVSHIPS 250-012), Washington, DC: Bureau of Ships, 1949; and Berezhnoi, S. S., Flot SSSR: Korabli i suda lendliza: Spravochnik ("The Soviet Navy: Lend-Lease Ships and Vessels: A Reference"), St. Petersburg, Russia: Belen, 1994.)
- Acquired: 16 August 1945
- Commissioned: 16 August 1945 (Note: According to Russell, Richard A., Project Hula: Secret Soviet-American Cooperation in the War Against Japan, Washington, D.C.: Naval Historical Center, 1997, ISBN 0-945274-35-1, which includes access to Soviet-era records unavailable during the Cold War, Project Hula ships were commissioned into the Soviet Navy simultaneously with their transfer from the U.S. Navy – see photo captions on p. 24 regarding the transfers of various large infantry landing craft (LCI(L)s) and information on p. 27 about the transfer of USS Coronado (PF-38), which Russell says typified the transfer process. As sources, Russell cites Department of the Navy, Ships Data: U.S. Naval Vessels Volume II, 1 January 1949, (NAVSHIPS 250-012), Washington, DC: Bureau of Ships, 1949; and Berezhnoi, S. S., Flot SSSR: Korabli i suda lendliza: Spravochnik ("The Soviet Navy: Lend-Lease Ships and Vessels: A Reference"), St. Petersburg, Russia: Belen, 1994.)
- Decommissioned: 16 October 1949
- Fate: Returned to United States, 16 October 1949

United States
- Name: Albuquerque
- Acquired: 16 October 1949
- Recommissioned: 26 July 1950
- Decommissioned: 10 May 1953
- Honors and awards: 4 × battle stars for Korean War service
- Fate: Transferred to Japan Maritime Self-Defense Force, 30 November 1953

Japan
- Name: Kiri
- Acquired: March 1953
- Decommissioned: 1 October 1975
- Renamed: YAC-20, 31 March 1970
- Reclassified: Auxiliary stock craft (YAC), 31 March 1970
- Identification: Hull symbol: PF-291/YAC-20
- Fate: Returned to United States, 22 January 1976 and scrapped

General characteristics
- Class & type: Tacoma-class patrol frigate
- Displacement: 1,430 long tons (1,450 t) (light load); 2,415 long tons (2,454 t) (full load)
- Length: 303 ft 11 in (92.63 m)
- Beam: 37 ft 6 in (11.43 m)
- Draft: 13 ft 8 in (4.17 m)
- Installed power: 2 × 3-Drum express boilers , 240 psi (1,700 kPa); 5,500 ihp (4,100 kW)
- Propulsion: 2 × Vertical triple-expansion steam engine; 2 × shafts
- Speed: 20.3 kn (37.6 km/h; 23.4 mph)
- Complement: 190
- Armament: 3 × 3 in (76 mm)/50 caliber dual-purpose (DP) gun; 2 × twin 40 mm (1.57 in) Bofors anti-aircraft (AA) gun mounts; 9 × 20 mm (0.79 in) Oerlikon cannon AA gun mounts; 2 × Depth charge tracks; 8 × Depth charge projectors; 1 × Hedgehog

USS Everett (PG-116/PF-8), a Tacoma-class patrol frigate in commission from 1944 to 1945 and from 1950 to 1953, thus far has been the only ship of the United States Navy to be named for Everett, Washington. She also served in the Soviet Navy as EK-15 and in the Japan Maritime Self-Defense Force as JDS Kiri (PF-11/PF-291/YAC-20).

== Construction and commissioning ==
Originally classified as a patrol gunboat, PG-116, Everett was reclassified as a patrol frigate, PF-8, on 15 April 1943. She was laid down under a Maritime Commission (MARCOM) contract, MC hull 1426, at the Permanente Metals Richmond Shipyard #4, Richmond, California. Everett was launched on 29 September 1943, sponsored by Mrs. Cornelia M. Fitch, and was commissioned on 22 January 1944.

== Service history ==
=== U.S. Navy, World War II, 1944–1945 ===
After shakedown and training, Everett steamed north to Adak, Territory of Alaska, arriving there on 22 April 1944, and began 16 months of patrol and escort duty in the Aleutian Islands. Selected for transfer to the Soviet Navy in Project Hula – a secret program for the transfer of U.S. Navy ships to the Soviet Navy at Cold Bay, Alaska, in anticipation of the Soviet Union joining the war against Japan – she then proceeded to Cold Bay in the summer of 1945 and began training her new Soviet crew.

=== Soviet Navy, 1945–1949 ===
Following the completion of training for her Soviet crew, Everett was decommissioned on 16 August 1945 at Cold Bay and transferred to the Soviet Union under Lend-Lease immediately along with her sister ships Tacoma (PF-3), Sausalito (PF-4), Hoquiam (PF-5), Pasco (PF-6), and Albuquerque (PF-7). Commissioned into the Soviet Navy immediately, Everett was designated as a storozhevoi korabl ("escort ship") and renamed EK-15 in Soviet service. She soon departed Cold Bay bound for Petropavlovsk-Kamchatsky in the Soviet Union, where she served as a patrol vessel in the Soviet Far East.

In February 1946, the United States began negotiations for the return of ships loaned to the Soviet Union for use during World War II. On 8 May 1947, United States Secretary of the Navy James V. Forrestal informed the United States Department of State that the United States Department of the Navy wanted 480 of the 585 combatant ships it had transferred to the Soviet Union for World War II use returned, EK-15 among them. Negotiations for the return of the ships were protracted, but on 15 November 1949 the Soviet Union finally returned EK-15 to the U.S. Navy at Yokosuka, Japan.

=== U.S. Navy, Korean War, 1950–1953 ===
Reverting to her original name, Everett was given an extensive overhaul at Yokosuka, where she was recommissioned on 26 July 1950, for service during the Korean War. Assigned to primary duty as station ship at Hong Kong, she also joined the United Nations Blockading and Escort Force in operations off both coasts of Korea. On 3 July 1951, while bombarding Wonsan, North Korea, Everett was hit by fire from a shore battery; one man was killed and seven were wounded, but damage to the ship was light.

=== Japan Maritime Self-Defense Force, 1953–1976 ===
On 10 March 1953, Everett was decommissioned at Yokosuka and lent to Japan, entering service with the Japan Maritime Self-Defense Force as JDS Kiri (PF-11) (きり (PF-11); "paulownia"). Kiri was redesignated PF-291 on 1 September 1957. The United States struck her from the Navy List on 1 December 1961. She was reclassified as an "auxiliary stock craft" (YAC) and renamed YAC-20 on 31 March 1970. Decommissioned on 1 October 1975, she was returned to the United States on 22 January 1976 for disposal and subsequently scrapped.

== Awards ==
The US Navy awarded Everett four battle stars for her Korean War service.

== Bibliography ==
- "Everett (PF-8)". Dictionary of American Naval Fighting Ships. Naval History and Heritage Command. 8 June 2015. This article incorporates text from this source, which is in the public domain.
- "Kaiser Permanente No. 4, Richmond CA". ShipbuildingHistory.com. 5 February 2014.
- "Everett (PF 8)". NavSource.
- Russell, Richard A. (1997). Project Hula: Secret Soviet-American Cooperation in the War Against Japan. Washington, D.C.: Naval Historical Center. ISBN 0-945274-35-1.
- "The Naval Database: JMSDF Kusu class patrol frigate (PF291) Kiri" (in Japanese).
