= USS Tacoma (PF-3) =

Lead ship of Tacoma-class patrol frigates

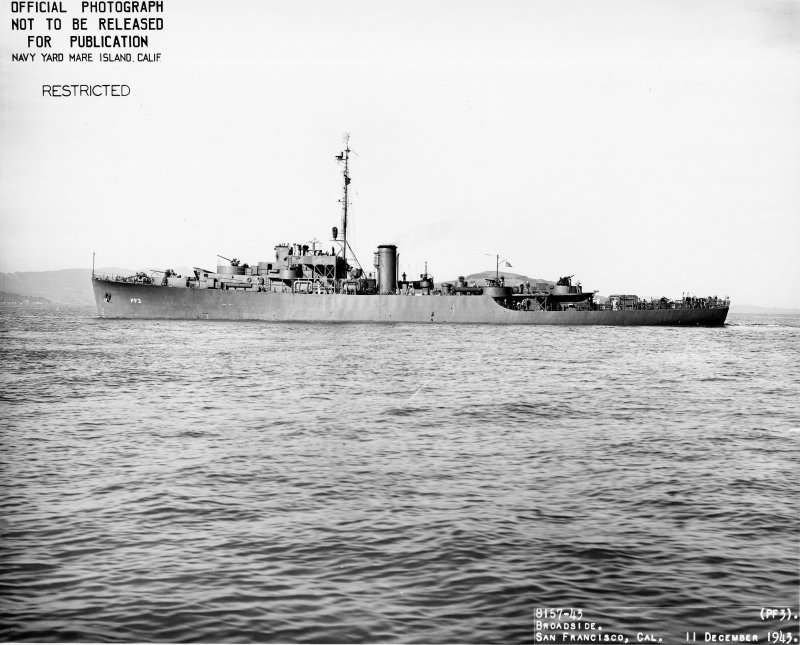
- USS Tacoma (PF-3), off San Francisco, 11 December 1943

History

United States
- Name: Tacoma
- Namesake: City of Tacoma, Washington
- Ordered: as a Type S2-S2-AQ1 hull, MCE hull 1421
- Builder: Permanente Metals Richmond Shipyard #4, Richmond, California
- Yard number: 46
- Laid down: 10 March 1943
- Reclassified: Patrol Frigate (PF), 15 April 1943
- Launched: 7 July 1943
- Sponsored by: Mrs. A. R. Bergersen
- Commissioned: 6 November 1943
- Decommissioned: 16 August 1945
- Identification: Hull symbol: PG-111; Hull symbol: PF-3; Call sign: NXWC
- Fate: transferred to Soviet Navy, 16 August 1945

Soviet Union
- Name: EK-11 (Note: The Dictionary of American Naval Fighting Ships Tacoma III, article states that Tacoma was named EK-12 in Soviet service and NavSource Online: Frigate Photo Archive Tacoma (PF 3) ex-PG-111, repeats this, but Project Hula: Secret Soviet-American Cooperation in the War Against Japan, which includes access to Soviet-era records unavailable during the Cold War, reports that the ship's Soviet name was EK-11. As sources, Russell cites Department of the Navy, Ships Data: U.S. Naval Vessels Volume II, 1 January 1949, (NAVSHIPS 250-012), Washington, DC: Bureau of Ships, 1949; and Berezhnoi, S. S., Flot SSSR: Korabli i suda lendliza: Spravochnik ("The Soviet Navy: Lend-Lease Ships and Vessels: A Reference"), St. Petersburg, Russia: Belen, 1994.)
- Acquired: 16 August 1945
- Commissioned: 16 August 1945 (Note: According to Project Hula: Secret Soviet-American Cooperation in the War Against Japan, which includes access to Soviet-era records unavailable during the Cold War, Project Hula ships were commissioned into the Soviet Navy simultaneously with their transfer from the US Navy; see photo captions on p. 24 regarding the transfers of various large infantry landing craft (LCI(L)s) and information on p. 27 about the transfer of Coronado (PF-38), which Russell says typified the transfer process. As sources, Russell cites Department of the Navy, Ships Data: U.S. Naval Vessels Volume II, 1 January 1949, (NAVSHIPS 250-012), Washington, DC: Bureau of Ships, 1949; and Berezhnoi, S. S., Flot SSSR: Korabli i suda lendliza: Spravochnik ("The Soviet Navy: Lend-Lease Ships and Vessels: A Reference"), St. Petersburg, Russia: Belen, 1994.)
- Decommissioned: 16 October 1949
- Fate: returned to United States, 16 October 1949

United States
- Name: Tacoma
- Acquired: 16 October 1949
- Recommissioned: 1 December 1950
- Decommissioned: October 1951
- Honors and awards: 3 × battle stars for Korean War service
- Fate: transferred to Republic of Korea Navy, 9 October 1951

South Korea
- Name: Taedong
- Namesake: Taedong County, South Pyongan Province
- Acquired: 9 October 1951
- Decommissioned: 28 February 1973
- Identification: Hull symbol: F-63
- Fate: returned to United States, 28 February 1973

United States
- Name: Tacoma
- Acquired: 28 February 1973
- Stricken: 20 April 1973
- Fate: donated to Republic of Korea Navy, 1 June 1973

South Korea
- Acquired: 1 June 1973
- Fate: Preserved
- Status: Museum ship

General characteristics
- Class & type: Tacoma-class patrol frigate
- Displacement: 1,430 long tons (1,450 t) (light load); 2,415 long tons (2,454 t) (full load)
- Length: 303 ft 11 in (92.63 m)
- Beam: 37 ft 6 in (11.43 m)
- Draft: 13 ft 8 in (4.17 m)
- Installed power: 2 × 3-Drum express boilers , 240 psi (1,700 kPa); 5,500 ihp (4,100 kW)
- Propulsion: 2 × Vertical triple-expansion steam engine; 2 × shafts
- Speed: 20.3 kn (37.6 km/h; 23.4 mph)
- Complement: 190
- Armament: 3 × 3 in (76 mm)/50 caliber dual-purpose (DP) gun; 2 × twin 40 mm (1.57 in) Bofors anti-aircraft (AA) gun mounts; 9 × 20 mm (0.79 in) Oerlikon cannon AA gun mounts; 2 × Depth charge tracks; 8 × Depth charge projectors; 1 × Hedgehog

USS Tacoma (PG-111/PF-3), the lead ship of the Tacoma-class patrol frigates. The third ship of the United States Navy to be named for Tacoma, Washington, she was in commission from 1943 to 1945, and from 1949 to 1951. She also served in the Soviet Navy as EK-11 and in the Republic of Korea Navy as ROKS Taedong (PF-63).

== Construction and commissioning ==
Tacoma was laid down on 10 March 1943, under a Maritime Commission (MARCOM) contract, MC hull No. 1421, as a patrol gunboat, PG-111, at Permanente Metals Richmond Shipyard #4, Richmond, California; she was redesignated a patrol frigate, PF-3, on 15 April 1943, and named Tacoma on 5 May 1943. Tacoma was launched on 7 July 1943; sponsored by Mrs. A. R. Bergersen; and commissioned on 6 November 1943.

== Service history ==
=== US Navy, World War II, 1943–1945 ===
After completing shakedown training off the California coast in December 1943, Tacoma reported for duty as a training ship in January 1944. She trained patrol frigate crews until 27 June 1944, when she was ordered to proceed to Alaskan waters upon completion of sea trials. However, she was plagued by unsuccessful trials and a boiler room fire and, consequently, did not report for duty at Kodiak, Alaska, until 21 October 1944. For the next four months, she conducted anti-submarine patrols and escorted supply ships and transports along the Alaskan coast and between the islands of the Aleutians chain, visiting Attu, Adak, Dutch Harbor, and other smaller Alaskan ports.

Selected for transfer to the Soviet Navy in Project Hula, a secret program for the transfer of U.S. Navy ships to the Soviet Navy at Cold Bay, Alaska, in anticipation of the Soviet Union joining the war against Japan, Tacoma departed Dutch Harbor on 23 February 1945 and steamed south for an extensive overhaul, first at San Francisco, California, then at Bremerton, Washington, to prepare for transfer to the Soviet Union. On 10 July 1945, she arrived at Cold Bay, and began familiarization training with her new Soviet crew.

=== Soviet Navy, 1945–1949 ===
Following the completion of training for her Soviet crew, Tacoma was decommissioned on 16 August 1945, at Cold Bay, and transferred to the Soviet Union under Lend-Lease immediately along with her sister ships Sausalito (PF-4), Hoquiam (PF-5), Pasco (PF-6), Albuquerque (PF-7), and Everett (PF-8). Commissioned into the Soviet Navy immediately, Tacoma was designated as a storozhevoi korabl ("escort ship"), and renamed EK-11 in Soviet service. She soon departed Cold Bay, bound for Petropavlovsk-Kamchatsky, in the Soviet Union and served as a patrol vessel in the Soviet Far East.

In February 1946, the United States began negotiations for the return of ships loaned to the Soviet Union for use during World War II. On 8 May 1947, United States Secretary of the Navy James V. Forrestal informed the United States Department of State that the United States Department of the Navy wanted 480 of the 585 combatant ships it had transferred to the Soviet Union returned, EK-11 among them. Negotiations for the return of the ships were protracted, but on 16 October 1949, the Soviet Union finally returned EK-11 to the US Navy at Yokosuka, Japan.

=== US Navy, Korean War, 1950–1951 ===
Reverting to her original name, Tacoma remained out of commission at Yokosuka, in a caretaker status, until the outbreak of the Korean War on 25 June 1950. She began preparations for activation in August 1950, and went back into commission on 1 December 1950, at Yokosuka. The next day, she began 15 days of shakedown training out of Yokosuka in Sagami Wan and Tokyo Bay. From 18 to 25 December 1950, she underwent post-shakedown repairs at Yokosuka, and put to sea on 26 December 1950, bound for Sasebo, Japan. On 28 December 1950, Tacoma headed for the east coast of Korea.

For the next few months, Tacoma operated with the United Nations Blockading and Escort Squadron, Task Force (TF) 95. On 30 January 1951, she joined in the bombardment phase of the amphibious feint at Kansong, and the following afternoon she performed the same duty at Kosong. She put in at Pusan on 1 February 1951, then headed for Sasebo on 3 February 1951. By 5 February 1951, she was back off Korea's eastern coast at Kangnung for a two-day bombardment mission there. On 7 and 8 February 1951, her gunners trained their sights on Yangyang, and then on Hwangpo, on 9 and 10 February 1951. When not pounding Hwangpo, Tacoma patrolled off Chikute Island. She returned to Sasebo, on 13 February 1951, and remained there until 19 February 1951, when she headed for Wonsan harbor in North Korea. She arrived off Wonsan, on 22 February 1951, and for the next four days joined in the operations which resulted in the successful landing of 110 Republic of Korea Marines on Sin Do, on 24 February 1951. The following day, she cleared Wonsan channel to return to Sasebo. She arrived at Sasebo, on 27 February 1951, and remained there until 10 March 1951, when she got underway for Yokosuka, and restricted repairs which lasted until 23 April 1951.

On 3 April 1951, the United States Naval Forces Far East (NavFE) organization was restructured. As a result, the Service Forces, previously fragmented among separate United States Seventh Fleet and NavFE groups, were consolidated into a new Logistics Group, designated Task Force 92. When Tacoma emerged from the shipyard at Yokosuka, in late April 1951, she was assigned to the new task organization as an escort, and she served in that capacity for the remainder of her US Navy career. From then until September 1951, she escorted supply ships between Japanese and Korean ports and to stations along the Korean coast, where she replenished United Nations warships. She also conducted anti-submarine patrols and participated in occasional shore bombardments.

=== Republic of Korea Navy, 1951–1973 ===
On 9 October 1951, the United States transferred Tacoma to the Republic of Korea. She served in the Republic of Korea Navy as ROKS Taedong (PF-63) until 28 February 1973, when she was decommissioned and returned to the US Navy, which struck her name from the Navy list on 2 April 1973, and subsequently donated her to the Republic of Korea Navy as a museum and training ship.

== Awards ==
The US Navy awarded Tacoma three battle stars for her service during the Korean War.

== Bibliography ==
- "Tacoma III (PF-3)". Dictionary of American Naval Fighting Ships. Naval History and Heritage Command. 25 September 2015. This article incorporates text from this source, which is in the public domain.
- "Kaiser Permanente No. 4, Richmond CA". ShipbuildingHistory.com. 5 February 2014.
- "USS Tacoma (PF-3)". NavSource.
- Russell, Richard A. (1997). Project Hula: Secret Soviet-American Cooperation in the War Against Japan. Washington, D.C.: Naval Historical Center. ISBN 0-945274-35-1.
