= USS Pasco =

Tacoma-class patrol frigate

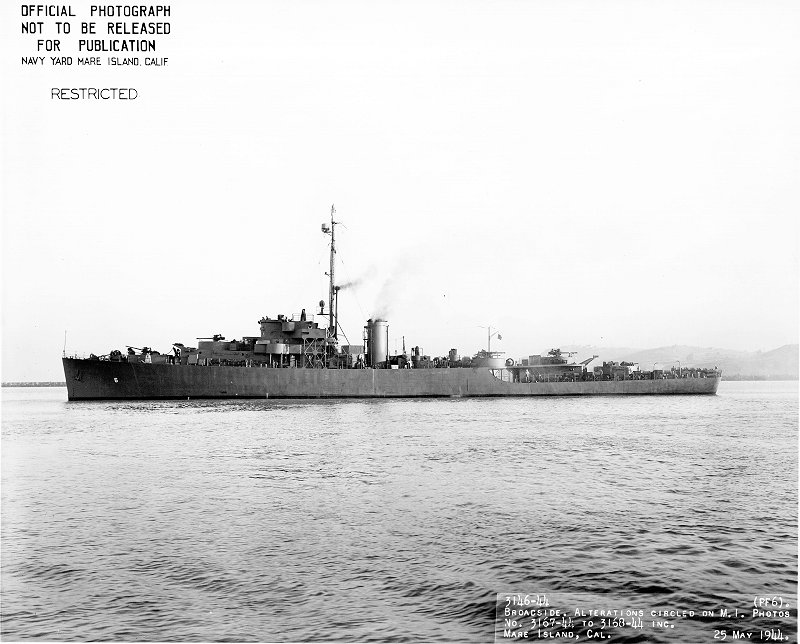
- USS Pasco (PF-6)

History

United States
- Name: Pasco
- Namesake: City of Pasco, Washington
- Reclassified: Patrol Frigate (PF), 15 April 1943
- Ordered: as a Type S2-S2-AQ1 hull, MCE hull 1424
- Builder: Permanente Metals Richmond Shipyard#4, Richmond, California
- Yard number: 49
- Laid down: 7 July 1943
- Launched: 17 August 1943
- Sponsored by: Miss Myrna Olson
- Commissioned: 15 April 1944
- Decommissioned: 16 August 1945
- Stricken: 1 December 1961
- Identification: Hull symbol: PG-114; Hull symbol: PF-6; Call sign: NDQP
- Fate: Transferred to Soviet Navy, 16 August 1945

Soviet Union
- Name: EK-12
- Acquired: 16 August 1945
- Commissioned: 16 August 1945 (Note: According to Russell, Richard A., Project Hula: Secret Soviet-American Cooperation in the War Against Japan, Washington, D.C.: Naval Historical Center, 1997, ISBN 0-945274-35-1, which includes access to Soviet-era records unavailable during the Cold War, Project Hula ships were commissioned into the Soviet Navy simultaneously with their transfer from the U.S. Navy; see photo captions on p. 24 regarding the transfers of various large infantry landing craft (LCI(L)s) and information on p. 27 about the transfer of USS Coronado, which Russell says typified the transfer process. As sources, Russell cites Department of the Navy, Ships Data: U.S. Naval Vessels Volume II, 1 January 1949, (NAVSHIPS 250-012), Washington, DC: Bureau of Ships, 1949; and Berezhnoi, S. S., Flot SSSR: Korabli i suda lendliza: Spravochnik ("The Soviet Navy: Lend-Lease Ships and Vessels: A Reference"), St. Petersburg, Russia: Belen, 1994.)
- Decommissioned: 1 November 1949
- Fate: Returned to United States, 16 October 1949 (Note: The Dictionary of American Naval Fighting Ships Pasco article states that the Soviet Union returned Pasco in 1950 and NavSource Online: Frigate Photo Archive Pasco (PF 6) ex-PG-114 and hazegray.org Pasco repeat this. However, Russell, Richard A., Project Hula: Secret Soviet-American Cooperation in the War Against Japan, Washington, D.C.: Naval Historical Center, 1997, ISBN 0-945274-35-1, pp. 38, 39, which includes access to Soviet-era records unavailable during the Cold War, reports that the Soviet Union returned 27 patrol frigates transferred in Project Hula, including Pasco, during October and November 1949. As sources, Russell cites Department of the Navy, Ships Data: U.S. Naval Vessels Volume II, 1 January 1949, (NAVSHIPS 250-012), Washington, DC: Bureau of Ships, 1949; and Berezhnoi, S. S., Flot SSSR: Korabli i suda lendliza: Spravochnik ("The Soviet Navy: Lend-Lease Ships and Vessels: A Reference"), St. Petersburg, Russia: Belen, 1994.); Transferred to Japan Maritime Self-Defense Force, 1953

Japan
- Name: Kashi
- Acquired: 1953
- Decommissioned: 30 June 1967
- Renamed: YAC-12, 30 June 1967
- Reclassified: Auxiliary stock craft (YAC) 30 June 1967
- Identification: Hull symbol: PF-283
- Fate: Returned to United States, 18 March 1968; Transferred to Republic of Korea Navy, 1969

South Korea
- Acquired: 1969
- Fate: Used for parts; Converted to floating pier, April 1969; Final disposition unknown

General characteristics
- Class & type: Tacoma-class patrol frigate
- Displacement: 1,430 long tons (1,450 t) (light load); 2,415 long tons (2,454 t) (full load)
- Length: 303 ft 11 in (92.63 m)
- Beam: 37 ft 6 in (11.43 m)
- Draft: 13 ft 8 in (4.17 m)
- Installed power: 2 × 3-Drum express boilers , 240 psi (1,700 kPa); 5,500 ihp (4,100 kW)
- Propulsion: 2 × Vertical triple-expansion steam engine; 2 × shafts
- Speed: 20.3 kn (37.6 km/h; 23.4 mph)
- Complement: 190
- Armament: 3 × 3 in (76 mm)/50 caliber dual-purpose (DP) gun; 2 × twin 40 mm (1.57 in) Bofors anti-aircraft (AA) gun mounts; 9 × 20 mm (0.79 in) Oerlikon cannon AA gun mounts; 2 × Depth charge tracks; 8 × Depth charge projectors; 1 × Hedgehog

USS Pasco (PG-114/PF-6), a Tacoma-class patrol frigate in commission from 1944 to 1945, has thus far been the only ship of the United States Navy to be named for Pasco, Washington. She later served in the Soviet Navy as EK-12 and in the Japan Maritime Self-Defense Force as JDS Kashi (PF-3/PF-283) and as YAC-12.

== Construction and commissioning ==
Originally classified as a patrol gunboat, PG-114, Pasco was reclassified as a patrol frigate, PF-6, on 15 April 1943. She was laid down under Maritime Commission (MARCOM) contract, as MC Hull 1424, on 7 July 1943, by the Permanente Metals Richmond Shipyard#4, Richmond, California. Launched on 17 August 1943, sponsored by Miss Myrna Olson, the ship was commissioned on 15 April 1944. Her first commanding officer was Commander Roy E. Stockstill, who was succeeded on 26 April 1945, by Lieutenant Olaz Laveson, USCGR.

== Service history ==
=== U.S. Navy, World War II, 1944–1945 ===
After shakedown, Pasco reported to San Francisco, California, on 25 May 1944, and conducted patrol operations in the San Francisco-San Diego, California, area until reporting to Kodiak, Territory of Alaska, to serve in the Alaskan Sea Frontier on 15 October 1944. In January 1945, she steamed to Seattle, Washington, and conducted defensive patrols off the coast of the Pacific Northwest.

Selected for transfer to the Soviet Navy in Project Hula – a secret program for the transfer of US Navy ships to the Soviet Navy at Cold Bay, Alaska, in anticipation of the Soviet Union joining the war against Japan – Pasco proceeded to Cold Bay, in the summer of 1945, and began training her new Soviet crew.

=== Soviet Navy, 1945–1949 ===
Following the completion of training for her Soviet crew, Pasco was decommissioned on 16 August 1945, at Cold Bay, and transferred to the Soviet Union under Lend-Lease immediately along with her sister ships Tacoma, Sausalito, Hoquiam, Albuquerque, and Everett. Commissioned into the Soviet Navy immediately, Pasco was designated as a storozhevoi korabl ("escort ship") and renamed EK-12 in Soviet service. She soon departed Cold Bay, bound for Petropavlovsk-Kamchatsky in the Soviet Union, where she served as a patrol vessel in the Soviet Far East.

In February 1946, the United States began negotiations for the return of ships loaned to the Soviet Union for use during World War II. On 8 May 1947, United States Secretary of the Navy James V. Forrestal informed the United States Department of State that the United States Department of the Navy wanted 480 of the 585 combatant ships it had transferred to the Soviet Union for World War II use returned, EK-12 among them. Negotiations for the return of the ships were protracted, but on 16 October 1949 the Soviet Union finally returned EK-12 to the US Navy at Yokosuka, Japan.

=== Japan Maritime Self-Defense Force, 1953–1968 ===
Reverting to her former name, Pasco lay idle in the Pacific Reserve Fleet at Yokosuka until loaned to Japan in 1953, entering service in the Japan Maritime Self-Defense Force as JDS Kashi (PF-3) (かし (PF-3); "live oak"). Kashi was redesignated PF-283 on 1 September 1957. The United States struck the ship from the Naval Vessel Register on 1 December 1961, and transferred her to Japan outright in 1964. Kashi was decommissioned on 30 June 1967, reclassified as an "auxiliary stock craft" (YAC), and renamed YAC-12. She was returned to US custody on 18 March 1968.

=== Republic of Korea Navy, 1969 ===
The United States transferred the ship to South Korea in 1969, and the Republic of Korea Navy cannibalized her for spare parts for its other Tacoma-class patrol frigates. In April 1969, the ship was converted to a floating pier. Her final disposition is unknown.

== Bibliography ==
- "Pasco". Dictionary of American Naval Fighting Ships. Naval History and Heritage Command. 18 August 2015. This article incorporates text from this source, which is in the public domain.
- "Kaiser Permanente No. 4, Richmond CA". ShipbuildingHistory.com. 5 February 2014.
- "Pasco (PF 6)". NavSource.
- Russell, Richard A. (1997). Project Hula: Secret Soviet-American Cooperation in the War Against Japan. Washington, D.C.: Naval Historical Center. ISBN 0-945274-35-1.
- "The Naval Database: JMSDF Kusu class patrol frigate (PF283) Kashi" (in Japanese).
