= Kiri Territory =

Kiri
- Territory
- Interactive map of Kiri
- Coordinates: 1.495455°S 18.92772°E
- Country: DR Congo
- Province: Mai-Ndombe
- Seat: Kiri

Area
  - Total: 12,000 km^{2} (4,600 sq mi)

Population
  - Total: 307,380
  - Density: 26/km^{2} (66/sq mi)
- Time zone: UTC+1 (West Africa Time)

Kiri Territory is an administrative region of Mai-Ndombe Province, Democratic Republic of the Congo. The headquarters is the town of Kiri.

== Location ==
Kiri territory has sandy clay soils, supporting food crops that include cassava, maize, banana, peanut, yams, sweet potatoes, sugarcane, rice, beans, vegetables, robusta coffee, cocoa and palm. Most of the land is covered with rain forest. The southern boundary is defined by the Lokoro River, which flows from the southeast, entering Lake Mai-Ndombe at the westernmost point of the territory. Kiri Territory is divided into the Beronge, Lutoy and Pendjwa sectors.

== Economy ==
The Kiri General Hospital was rehabilitated in 1983, and a farmers cooperative was established in 1995. As of 1997 Kiri Territory had a population of 121,604 within an area of 12,070 square kilometres (4,660 sq mi), or about 11 people per square kilometer. Trade was mostly with Kinshasa via the neighboring territory of Inongo to the west, handled by a cartel of traders who controlled prices. Local products such as manioc or fish were exchanged for manufactured goods such as hammocks or machetes.

As of 2004 the territory lacked electricity and drinking water supplies, and had no telephone, radio or television service. It does have an airport (Basango Mboliasa Airport) in good condition that is used for occasional unscheduled flights.

== Sources ==
- Blaes, X. (October 2008). "Découpage administratif de la République Démocratique du Congo" (PDF). UNOCHA and PNUD. Archived from the original (PDF) on 2016-08-18.
- Mpoto Iyango, Franklin (2001). "La Problématique du Développement Intégré du Territoire de KIRI" (PDF) (in French).
- Mpoto, Franklin (2004). "Création d'un site Internet du Territoire de Kiri". Congo Concern Network. Archived from the original on 2009-04-20.
