= USS Fentress =

Cargo ship of the United States Navy

History

United States
- Name: Fentress
- Namesake: Fentress County, Tennessee
- Ordered: as type (C1-M-AV1) hull, MC hull 2376
- Builder: Kaiser Shipbuilding Co., Richmond, California
- Yard number: 72
- Laid down: 1944
- Launched: 10 March 1945
- Sponsored by: Mrs. G. M. Ellis
- Commissioned: 4 May 1945
- Decommissioned: 20 February 1946
- Stricken: 5 June 1946
- Identification: Hull symbol: AK-180; Code letters: NEKQ
- Fate: assigned to Military Sea Transportation Service, 1 July 1950

United States
- Name: Fentress
- Operator: Military Sea Transportation Service
- In service: 1 July 1950
- Out of service: unknown
- Stricken: 15 October 1973
- Identification: Hull symbol: T-AK-180
- Fate: transferred 21 November 1973, to Maritime Administration

Trust Territory of the Pacific Islands
- Name: Fentress
- In service: 20 July 1974
- Out of service: 4 July 1982
- Fate: transferred 4 July 1982

Republic of the Marshall Islands
- Name: Fentress
- In service: 4 July 1982
- Identification: IMO number: 7619783
- Fate: Scrapped 1985

General characteristics
- Class & type: Alamosa-class cargo ship
- Type: C1-M-AV1
- Tonnage: 5,032 long tons deadweight (DWT)
- Displacement: 2,382 long tons (2,420 t) (standard); 7,450 long tons (7,570 t) (full load)
- Length: 388 ft 8 in (118.47 m)
- Beam: 50 ft (15 m)
- Draft: 21 ft 1 in (6.43 m)
- Installed power: 1 × Nordberg, TSM 6 diesel engine; 1,750 shp (1,300 kW)
- Propulsion: 1 × propeller
- Speed: 11.5 kn (21.3 km/h; 13.2 mph)
- Capacity: 3,945 t (3,883 long tons) DWT; 9,830 cu ft (278 m^{3}) (refrigerated); 227,730 cu ft (6,449 m^{3}) (non-refrigerated)
- Complement: 15 Officers; 70 Enlisted
- Armament: 1 × 3 in (76 mm)/50 caliber dual-purpose gun (DP); 6 × 20 mm (0.8 in) Oerlikon anti-aircraft (AA) cannons

USS Fentress (AK-180/T-AK-180) was an Alamosa-class cargo ship acquired by the US Navy during the final months of World War II. In 1950, she was reactivated and placed into service with the Military Sea Transportation Service as USNS Fentress. She was ultimately transferred to the Trust Territory of the Pacific Islands and the Republic of the Marshall Islands.

== Construction ==
Fentress was launched on 10 March 1945, by Kaiser Cargo, Inc., Richmond, California, under a Maritime Commission contract, MC hull 2376; sponsored by Mrs. G. M. Ellis; and commissioned 4 May 1945.

== Service history ==
=== World War II-related service ===
After shakedown and availability, Fentress engaged in local operations until 27 June 1945 when she departed San Francisco, California, to transport cargo among the Philippine Islands. On 20 February 1946 she was placed out of commission and returned to the U.S. Maritime Commission.

== Service with the MSTS ==
After the organization of the Military Sea Transportation Service (MSTS), Fentress was reacquired on 1 July 1950 for service.

== Merchant service ==
Fentress was struck from the Navy List on 15 October 1973 and transferred to the Government of the Trust Territory of the Pacific Islands on 20 July 1974.

On 4 July 1982, she was transferred permanently to the Republic of the Marshall Islands.

This ship was apparently still docked on the Hawaiian Islands in 1982, as it was seen on the Magnum P.I. episode, "I do".

The ship was scrapped in 1985.

== Notes ==
Citations

== Bibliography ==
Online resources

- "Fentress (AK-180)". Dictionary of American Naval Fighting Ships. Naval History and Heritage Command. 18 December 2014. This article incorporates text from this source, which is in the public domain.
- "C1 Cargo Ships". ShipbuildingHistory.com. 28 August 2009.
- "Fentress (AK-180)". NavSource. 18 April 2014.
