= USS Albuquerque (PF-7) =

Tacoma-class patrol frigate

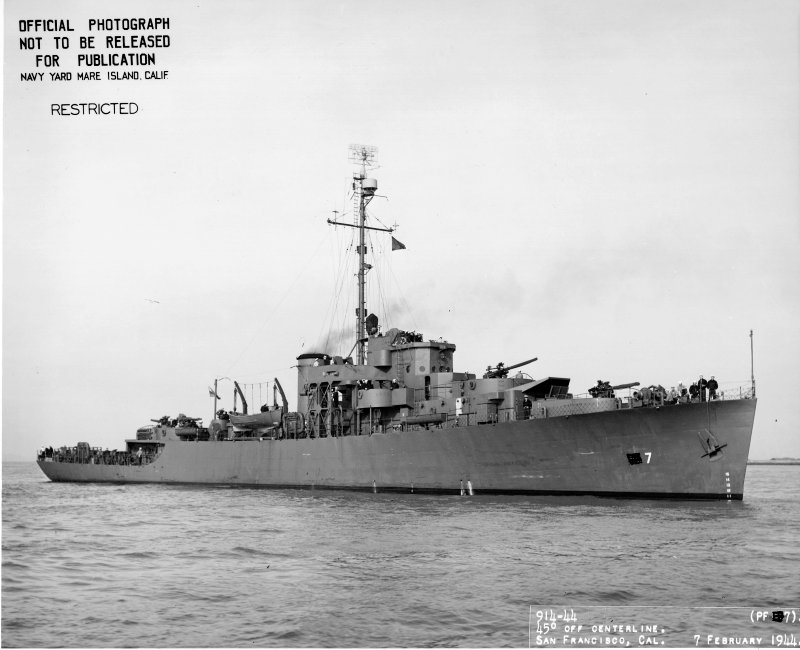
- USS Albuquerque (PF-7)

History

United States
- Name: Albuquerque
- Namesake: City of Albuquerque, New Mexico
- Reclassified: Patrol Frigate (PF), 15 April 1943
- Ordered: as a Type S2-S2-AQ1 hull, MCE hull 1425
- Builder: Permanente Metals Richmond Shipyard #4, Richmond, California
- Yard number: 50
- Laid down: 20 July 1943
- Launched: 14 September 1943
- Sponsored by: Mrs. B. L. Livingstone
- Commissioned: 20 December 1943
- Decommissioned: 16 August 1945
- Stricken: 1 December 1961
- Identification: Hull symbol: PG-115; Hull symbol: PF-7; Call sign: NFFG
- Fate: Transferred to Soviet Navy 16 August 1945 (Note: The Dictionary of American Naval Fighting Ships Albuquerque I" article states that Albuquerque was transferred to the Soviet Navy on 17 August 1945, and NavSource Online: Frigate Photo Archive Albuquerque (PF 7) ex-PG-115 and hazegray.org Albuquerque repeat this date, but more recent research in Russell, Richard A., Project Hula: Secret Soviet-American Cooperation in the War Against Japan, Washington, D.C.: Naval Historical Center, 1997, ISBN 0-945274-35-1, p. 39, which includes access to Soviet-era records unavailable during the Cold War, reports that the transfer date was 16 August 1945. As sources, Russell cites Department of the Navy, Ships Data: U.S. Naval Vessels Volume II, 1 January 1949, (NAVSHIPS 250-012), Washington, DC: Bureau of Ships, 1949; and Berezhnoi, S. S., Flot SSSR: Korabli i suda lendliza: Spravochnik ("The Soviet Navy: Lend-Lease Ships and Vessels: A Reference"), St. Petersburg, Russia: Belen, 1994.)

Soviet Union
- Name: EK-14 (Note: NavSource Online: Frigate Photo Archive Albuquerque (PF 7) ex-PG-115 asserts that Albuquerque was named EK-16 in Soviet Navy service without citing a source for this name, but Russell, Richard A., Project Hula: Secret Soviet-American Cooperation in the War Against Japan, Washington, D.C.: Naval Historical Center, 1997, ISBN 0-945274-35-1, p. 39, which includes access to Soviet-era records unavailable during the Cold War, reports that the ship's Soviet name was EK-14. As sources, Russell cites Department of the Navy, Ships Data: U.S. Naval Vessels Volume II, 1 January 1949, (NAVSHIPS 250-012), Washington, DC: Bureau of Ships, 1949; and Berezhnoi, S. S., Flot SSSR: Korabli i suda lendliza: Spravochnik ("The Soviet Navy: Lend-Lease Ships and Vessels: A Reference"), St. Petersburg, Russia: Belen, 1994.)
- Acquired: 16 August 1945
- Commissioned: 16 August 1945 (Note: According to Russell, Richard A., Project Hula: Secret Soviet-American Cooperation in the War Against Japan, Washington, D.C.: Naval Historical Center, 1997, ISBN 0-945274-35-1, which includes access to Soviet-era records unavailable during the Cold War, Project Hula ships were commissioned into the Soviet Navy simultaneously with their transfer from the U.S. Navy; see photo captions on p. 24 regarding the transfers of various large infantry landing craft (LCI(L)s) and information on p. 27 about the transfer of USS Coronado (PF-38), which Russell says typified the transfer process. As sources, Russell cites Department of the Navy, Ships Data: U.S. Naval Vessels Volume II, 1 January 1949, (NAVSHIPS 250-012), Washington, DC: Bureau of Ships, 1949; and Berezhnoi, S. S., Flot SSSR: Korabli i suda lendliza: Spravochnik ("The Soviet Navy: Lend-Lease Ships and Vessels: A Reference"), St. Petersburg, Russia: Belen, 1994.)
- Decommissioned: 16 October 1949
- Fate: returned to United States, 16 October 1949

United States
- Name: Albuquerque
- Acquired: 16 October 1949
- Recommissioned: 3 October 1950
- Decommissioned: 28 February 1953
- Honors and awards: 3 × battle stars for Korean War service
- Fate: Transferred to Japan Maritime Self-Defense Force, 30 November 1953

Japan
- Name: Tochi
- Acquired: 30 November 1953
- Commissioned: 31 March 1969
- Renamed: YAC-15, 31 March 1965
- Reclassified: Auxiliary stock craft (YAC), 31 March 1965
- Identification: Hull symbol: PF-296/YAC-15
- Fate: Returned to United States, 9 July 1971

General characteristics
- Class & type: Tacoma-class frigate patrol frigate
- Displacement: 1,430 long tons (1,450 t) (light load); 2,415 long tons (2,454 t) (full load)
- Length: 303 ft 11 in (92.63 m)
- Beam: 37 ft 6 in (11.43 m)
- Draft: 13 ft 8 in (4.17 m)
- Installed power: 2 × 3-Drum express boilers , 240 psi (1,700 kPa); 5,500 ihp (4,100 kW)
- Propulsion: 2 × Vertical triple-expansion steam engine; 2 × shafts
- Speed: 20.3 kn (37.6 km/h; 23.4 mph)
- Complement: 190
- Armament: 3 × 3 in (76 mm)/50 caliber dual-purpose (DP) gun; 2 × twin 40 mm (1.57 in) Bofors anti-aircraft (AA) gun mounts; 9 × 20 mm (0.79 in) Oerlikon cannon AA gun mounts; 2 × Depth charge tracks; 8 × Depth charge projectors; 1 × Hedgehog

USS Albuquerque (PG-115/PF-7), a Tacoma-class patrol frigate in commission from 1943 to 1945 and from 1950 to 1953, was the first ship of the United States Navy to be named for Albuquerque, New Mexico. She also served in the Soviet Navy as EK-14 and in the Japan Maritime Self-Defense Force as JDS Tochi (PF-16/PF-296) and as YAC-15.

== Construction and commissioning ==
Albuquerque, originally classified as a patrol gunboat, PG-115, but reclassified as a patrol frigate, PF-7, on 15 April 1943, was laid down under a Maritime Commission (MARCOM) contract, MC hull 1425, on 20 July 1943, at the Permanente Metals Richmond Shipyard #4, Richmond, California. Launched on 14 September 1943, sponsored by Mrs. B. L. Livingstone, the ship was commissioned on 20 December 1943.

== Service history ==
=== U.S. Navy, World War II, 1943–1945 ===
After fitting out and shakedown training, Albuquerque stood out from Treasure Island, California, on 24 March 1944, bound for Seattle, Washington. She arrived at Seattle, on 26 March 1944, and remained there until getting underway on 5 April 1944, as an escort for a convoy bound for the Territory of Alaska. She and her convoy arrived at Dutch Harbor, on Unalaska Island, in the Aleutian Islands, on 16 April 1944, where she was assigned to Escort Division 27. After the Liberty ship John Straub, operating as a cargo ship for the United States Army, either struck a mine or was torpedoed by the Imperial Japanese Navy submarine I-180 and broke in two in the Pacific Ocean at 54°22′N 163°24′W, approximately 20 nautical miles (37 km; 23 mi) southeast of Sanak Island in the Fox Islands subgroup of the Aleutian Islands on 19 April 1944 and her bow section sank, Albuquerque scuttled her stern section.

For the rest of 1944 and the first half of 1945, Albuquerque shepherded convoys between various Alaskan ports and conducted patrols around the Aleutian Islands and in the Bering Sea. Between 5 June and 14 July 1945, Albuquerque made a round-trip voyage from Dutch Harbor to Seattle and back. Selected for transfer to the Soviet Navy in Project Hula – a secret program for the transfer of U.S. Navy ships to the Soviet Navy at Cold Bay, Alaska, in anticipation of the Soviet Union joining the war against Japan – she then proceeded to Cold Bay and began training her new Soviet crew.

=== Soviet Navy, 1945–1949 ===
Following the completion of training for her Soviet crew, Albuquerque was decommissioned on 16 August 1945, at Cold Bay, and transferred to the Soviet Union under Lend-Lease immediately along with her sister ships Tacoma (PF-3), Sausalito (PF-4), Hoquiam (PF-5), Pasco (PF-6), and Everett (PF-8). Commissioned into the Soviet Navy immediately, Albuquerque was designated as a storozhevoi korabl ("escort ship") and renamed EK-14 in Soviet service. She soon departed Cold Bay, bound for Petropavlovsk-Kamchatsky in the Soviet Union, where she served as a patrol vessel in the Soviet Far East.

In February 1946, the United States began negotiations for the return of ships loaned to the Soviet Union for use during World War II. On 8 May 1947, United States Secretary of the Navy James V. Forrestal informed the United States Department of State that the United States Department of the Navy wanted 480 of the 585 combatant ships it had transferred to the Soviet Union for World War II use returned, EK-14 among them. Negotiations for the return of the ships were protracted, but on 15 November 1949, the Soviet Union finally returned EK-14 to the US Navy at Yokosuka, Japan.

=== U.S. Navy, Korean War, 1950–1953 ===
Reverting to her former name, Albuquerque lay idle in the Pacific Reserve Fleet at Yokosuka until the outbreak of the Korean War, on 25 June 1950, created a demand for more US Navy escort ships. Following repairs and refurbishment, she was recommissioned at Yokosuka, on 3 October 1950. For the next 10 months, she escorted convoys and conducted patrols between Yokosuka, Hong Kong, and Singapore. In August 1951, she operated between Yokosuka and Subic Bay on Luzon in the Philippine Islands. On 10 December 1951, she departed Yokosuka, stopped at Sasebo, Japan, and, on 15 September 1951, got underway from Sasebo for patrol and escort duty along the eastern coast of Korea. As a unit of Escort Division 5, Destroyer Flotilla 3, United States Pacific Fleet, she spent the rest of September 1951 and most of October 1951 operating along the Korean coast.

Albuquerque concluded that duty on 26 October 1951, when she departed Sasebo bound for Hong Kong. She arrived in at Hong Kong on 30 October 1951 and remained there, presumably in some sort of station ship status, until March 1952. On 6 March 1952, she stood out of Hong Kong, bound for Subic Bay in the Philippines. From Subic Bay, she headed back to Japan, returning to Sasebo on 16 May 1952. Based there, she resumed patrol and escort duties along the eastern coast of Korea. That assignment lasted for about six weeks. In July 1952, she again visited Subic Bay, and on 26 July 1952, arrived in Hong Kong. She once more made an extended visit to Hong Kong, until finally departing in mid-November 1952. After a visit to Subic Bay, she returned to Sasebo, on 3 December 1952, and resumed duty along the eastern coast of Korea. On 28 February 1953, she was decommissioned at Yokosuka.

=== Japan Maritime Self-Defense Force, 1953–1968 ===
On 30 November 1953, the United States loaned the ship to Japan, and she was commissioned in the Japan Maritime Self-Defense Force as JDS Tochi (PF-16) (とち (PF-16); "aesculus turbinata"). The JMSDF reclassified her as PF-296 on 1 September 1957. The US Navy struck her from the Navy List on 1 December 1961, but she was returned briefly to US Navy custody on 28 August 1962, before the United States almost simultaneously transferred her back to Japan permanently. Reclassified as an "auxiliary stock craft" (YAC) and renamed YAC-15 on 31 March 1965, she was decommissioned on 31 March 1969, and returned to US custody on 9 July 1971, for disposal. Her final disposition is unknown.

== Awards ==
The US Navy awarded Albuquerque three battle stars for her Korean War service.

== Bibliography ==
- "Albuquerque I (PF-7)". Dictionary of American Naval Fighting Ships. Naval History and Heritage Command. 15 June 2015. This article incorporates text from this source, which is in the public domain.
- "Kaiser Permanente No. 4, Richmond CA". ShipbuildingHistory.com. 5 February 2014.
- "Albuquerque (PF 7)". NavSource.
- Russell, Richard A. (1997). Project Hula: Secret Soviet-American Cooperation in the War Against Japan. Washington, D.C.: Naval Historical Center. ISBN 0-945274-35-1.
- "The Naval Database: JMSDF Kusu class patrol frigate (PF296) Tochi" (in Japanese).
