= Kiri, Democratic Republic of the Congo =

Kiri
- Commune
- Location within Democratic Republic of the Congo
- Coordinates: 1.495455°S 18.92772°E
- Country: DR Congo
- Province: Mai-Ndombe
- Territory: Kiri
- Elevation: 309 m (1,013 ft)

Population (2012)
  - Total: 14,612
- Time zone: UTC+1 (West Africa Time)

Kiri is a town in Mai-Ndombe Province, Democratic Republic of the Congo. It is the headquarters of Kiri Territory. As of 2012 the estimated population was 14,612. The town is served by a small airport, Basango Mboliasa Airport, at an elevation of 309 metres (1,013 ft).
