= Kiri (given name) =

Origin
- Region of origin: various

Kiri is a given name appearing in various cultures.

In Cambodian or Khmer, "Kiri" (or alternatively spelt "Kiry") means mountain summit.

In Māori, "kiri" means "skin", "bark", or "rind".

In Finland, Kiri (male) name is listed in Finnish orthodox calendar. The name is a short version of Kyriakos (Saint Cyriacus the Anchorite).

- Kiri Te Kanawa (born 1944), New Zealand opera singer
- Kim Kiri (born 1985), South Korean comedian
- Kiri Baga (born 1995), American figure skater
- Kiri Davis (fl. 2000s), African-American filmmaker
- Kiri Pritchard-McLean (born 1986), British comedian

== Fictional characters ==
- Kiri Komori, character in Sayonara Zetsubō Sensei
- Kiri, character in Mortal Kombat: Conquest
- Kiri Minase, character in Never Give Up!
- Kiri Marialate, character in Divergence Eve
- Kiri te Suli Kireysi'ite (Kiri Sully), character in Avatar: The Way of Water
