= Basango Mboliasa Airport =

- IATA: KRZ; ICAO: FZBT

Summary
- Serves: Kiri
- Elevation AMSL: 1,017 ft / 310 m
- Coordinates: 1°30′00″S 18°55′40″E

Map
- Location within DRC

Runways
Direction	Length		Surface
Direction	m	ft	Surface
07/25	1,540	5,052	Dirt
- Sources: Google Maps GCM

Basango Mboliasa Airport (IATA: KRZ, ICAO: FZBT) serves the town of Kiri in Mai-Ndombe Province, Democratic Republic of the Congo.

== See also ==
- Transport in the Democratic Republic of the Congo
- List of airports in the Democratic Republic of the Congo
