= Richmond Shipyards =

- Richmond Shipyard Number Three
- U.S. National Register of Historic Places
- California Historical Landmark
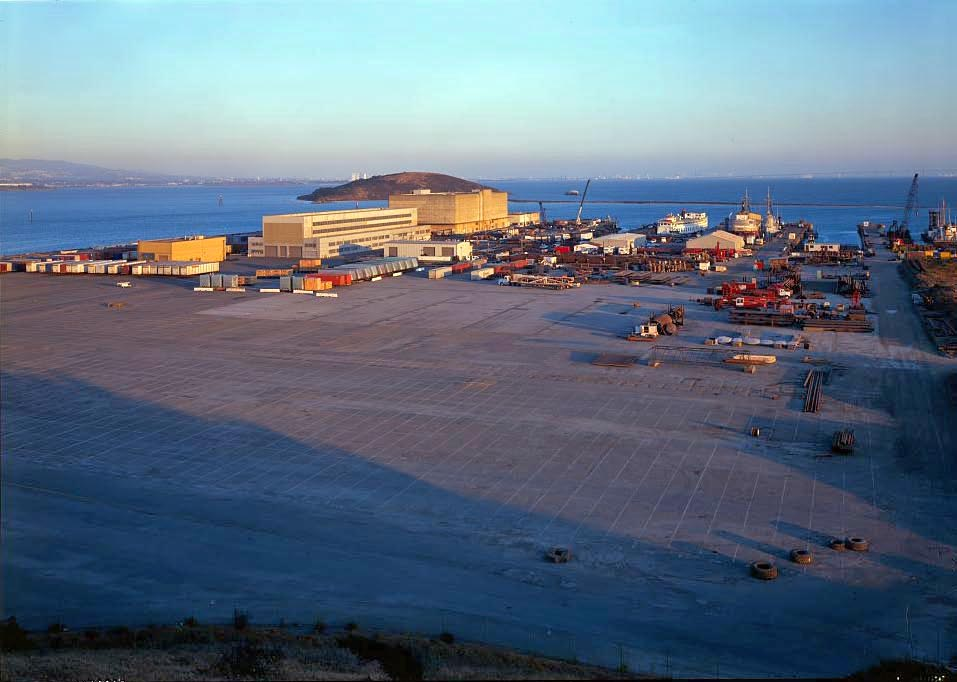

- Location within San Francisco Bay Area Location within California Location within the United States
- Location: Richmond, California, U.S.
- Coordinates: 37°54′22.3″N 122°21′52.79″W
- Built: 1940
- NRHP reference No.: 00000364
- CHISL No.: 1032
- Added to NRHP: April 28, 2000

The four Richmond Shipyards, in the city of Richmond, California, United States, were run by Permanente Metals and part of the Kaiser Shipyards. In World War II, Richmond built more ships than any other shipyard, turning out as many as three ships in a single day. The shipyards are part of the Rosie the Riveter/World War II Home Front National Historical Park, whose Rosie the Riveter memorial honors the shipyard workers. Shipyard #3 is listed on the National Register of Historic Places and is a California Historical Landmark # 1032.

== History ==
Henry J. Kaiser had been building cargo ships for the U.S. Maritime Commission in the late 1930s. When he received orders for ships from the British government, already at war with Nazi Germany, Kaiser established his first Richmond shipyard in December 1940. The shipyard legacy continues by virtue of its innovative medical care, which was derived from Kaiser's earlier California Colorado Aqueduct Project insurance and today called Kaiser Permanente.

The four Richmond Kaiser Shipyards built 747 ships in World War II, a rate never equaled. Compared to the average ship built elsewhere, Richmond ships were completed in two-thirds the time and at a quarter of the cost. The Liberty ship Robert E. Peary was assembled in less than five days as a part of a competition among shipyards. By 1944, the yard routinely needed only a bit more than two weeks to assemble a Liberty ship. By the end of the war the Richmond Shipyards had built $1.8 billion worth of ships.

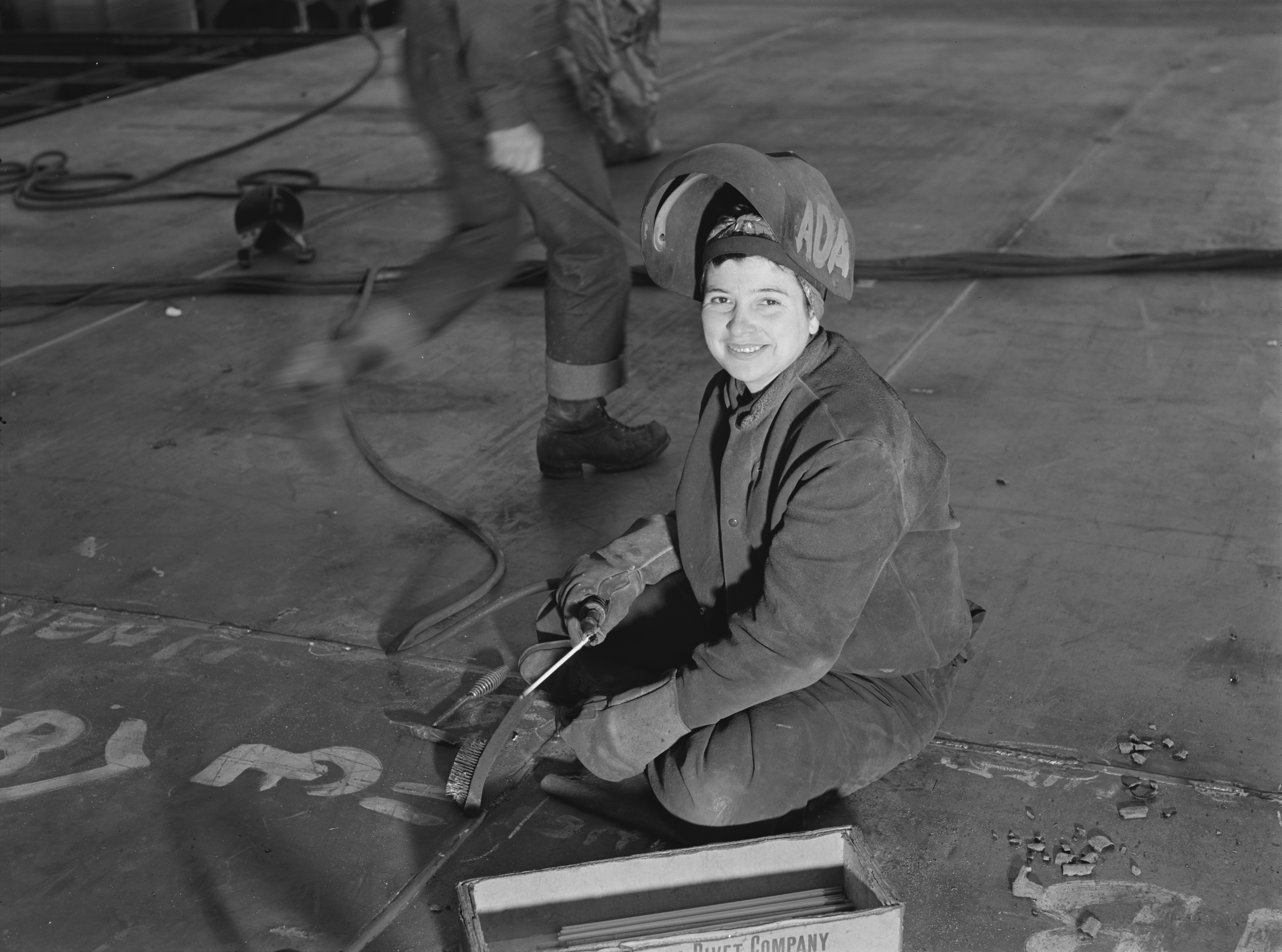
A "Wendy the Welder" at the shipyard

Kaiser and his workers applied mass assembly line techniques to building the ships. This production line technique, bringing pre-made parts together, moving them into place with huge cranes and having them welded together by "Rosies" (actually "Wendy the Welders" here in the shipyards), allowed unskilled laborers to do repetitive jobs requiring relatively little training to accomplish. This sped up construction, allowed more workers to be mobilized, and opened jobs to women and minorities.

In the war, thousands of men and women worked in this area in hazardous jobs. Actively recruited by Kaiser, they came from all over the United States to swell the population of Richmond from 20,000 to over 100,000 in three years. For many of them, this was the first time they worked, earned money, and faced the problems of working parents: finding day care and housing.

Women and minorities entered the workforce in areas previously denied to them. However, they still faced unequal pay, were shunted off into "auxiliary" unions and still had to deal with prejudice and inequities. In the war, labor strikes and sit-down work stoppages eventually led to better conditions.

Many workers commuted from other parts of the Bay Area to the Kaiser Shipyards in Richmond on the Shipyard Railway, a temporary wartime railway whose trains used cars of the local Key System and whose line extended from a depot in Emeryville to a loop serving all four shipyards.

The SS Red Oak Victory is docked nearby Kaiser Richmond No. 3 Yard.

== Kaiser Richmond shipyards ==
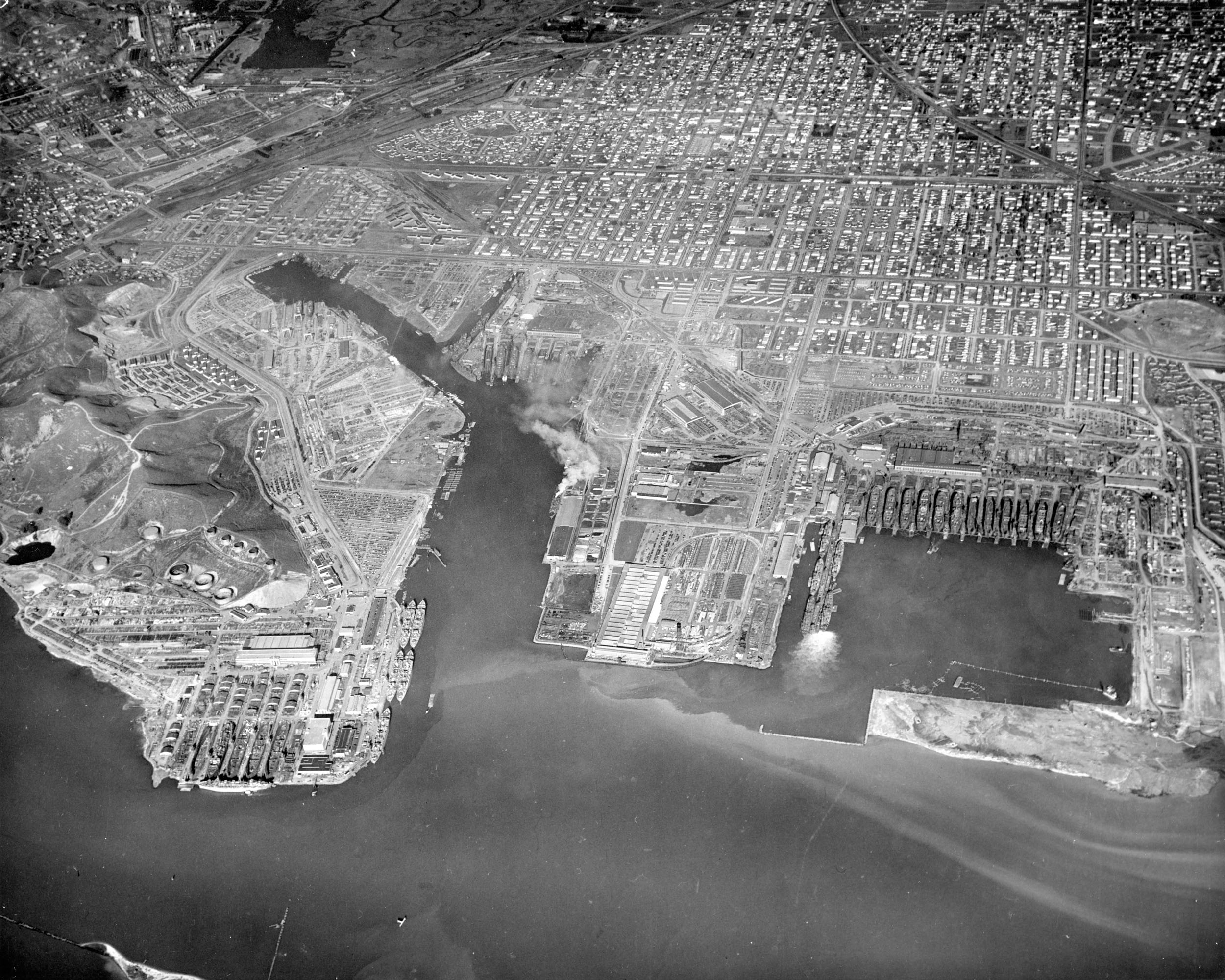
Richmond shipyards 1–4 in 1944

For World War II Kaiser opened four shipyards along the northeast shoreline of San Francisco Bay, each using prefabricated parts to build ships. Prefabricated subcontractors included: Graham Ship Repair Company, Herrick Iron Works, Independent Iron Works, Berkeley's Trailer Company of America, Steel Tank & Pipe Company, California Steel Products Corporation, Pacific Coast Engineering in Alameda and Clyde W. Wood in Stockton.

=== Kaiser Richmond No. 1 Yard ===
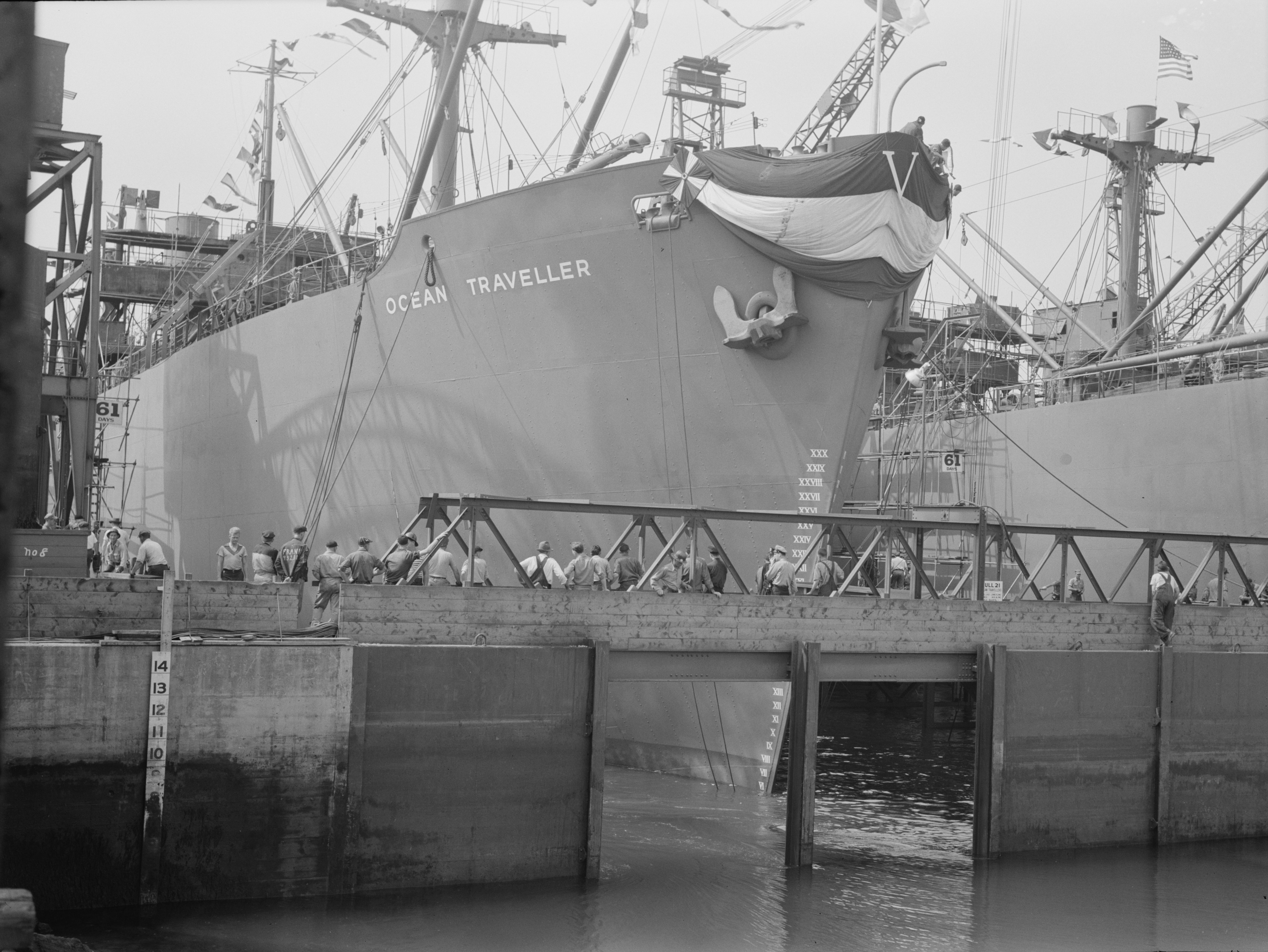
Ocean Traveller launched August, 1942

Kaiser Richmond No. 1 Yard was a new shipyard built to support the demand for ships for World War II. Kaiser purchased the contract and the yard to build the Ocean ship type, from the Todd Shipyards in 1940. Kaiser built yard No. 1 to build these ships, on unoccupied land with construction starting in December 1940. In April 1941 the keel for the first British bound Ocean ship was laid. The next series of ships built were Liberty ships, with the first keel laid on May 15, 1942. Needing faster cargo ships the next series of ships built were Victory ships, with the first keel laid on January 17, 1944. After the war, in 1946, the yard closed. Kaiser Richmond No. 1 Yard was at 700 Wright Ave, Richmond on the Parr Canal. The site now has general docks for construction supplies. Located at GPS 37.920887°N 122.362920°W.

Built at Kaiser Richmond No. 1 Yard:

- Ocean ship, 30 cargo ships, 7,174 GRT. (sometimes credited to Todd Shipyards Corporation)
- Liberty ship, 138 model EC2-S-C1 ships, 7,176 GRT.
- Victory ship, 82 Model VC2-S-AP3 ships, 7,612 GRT.

Notable ships: Ocean Victory, Ocean Vigour, Chief Ouray, Logan Victory and Northeastern Victory.

=== Kaiser Richmond No. 2 Yard ===
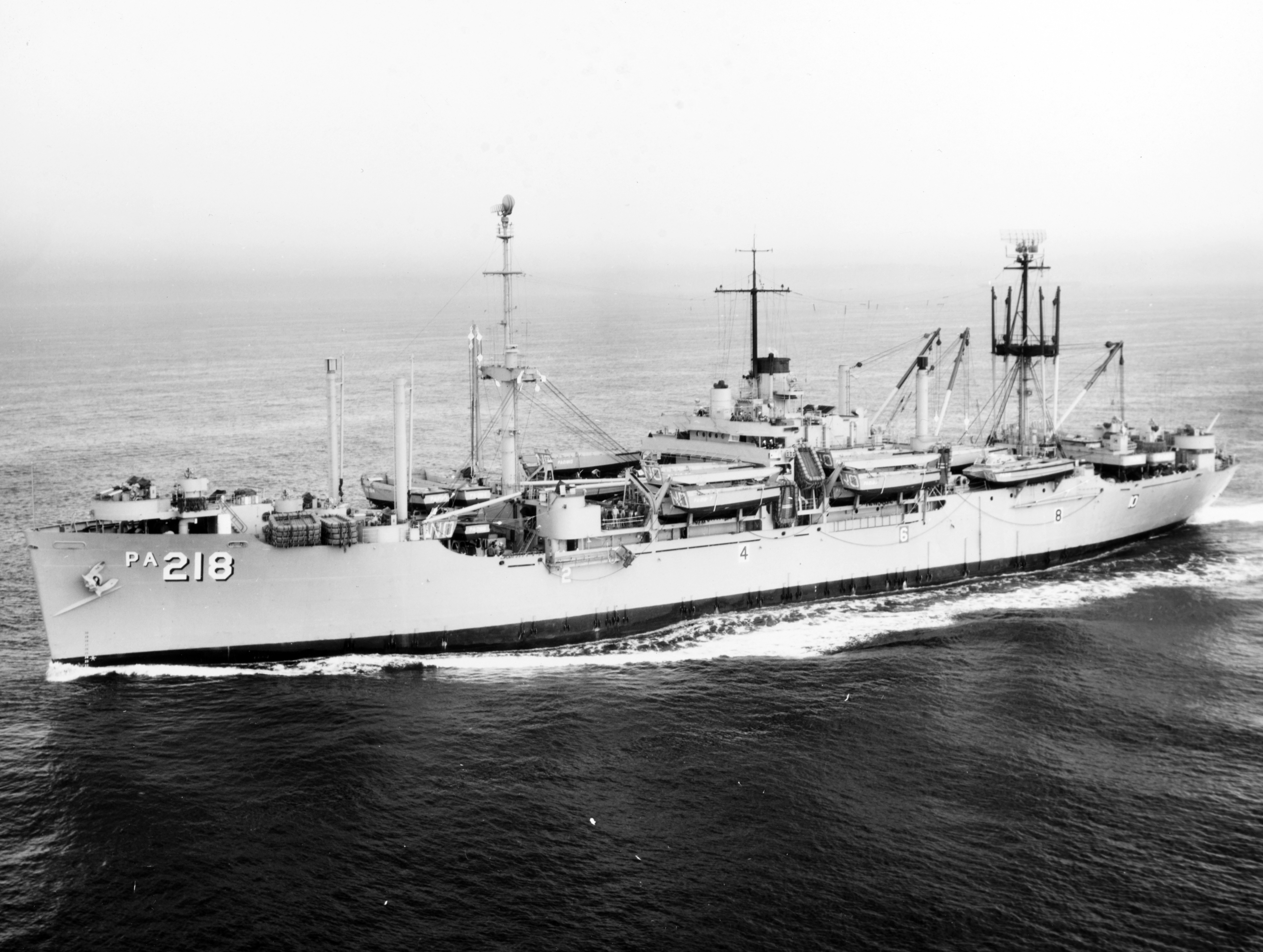
USS Noble (APA-218), Haskell-class attack

Kaiser Richmond No. 2 Yard started as a joint project of Kaiser Permanente Metals Corporation and Todd Shipyards Corporation. Construction of its first Liberty Ship at the site started in September 1941. Permanente Metals was a subcontractor building many of the pre-fabricated parts of the ships. Kaiser purchased Todd's interest in the yard in 1942 and renamed it Kaiser Richmond No. 2 Yard. The yard started by working 6 keels at a time and at its peak was working on 12 keels a day. Most ships being built in under 30 days. The yard was built starting in 1941 and closed at the end of the war in 1945, no traces of yard No. 2 remain. The yard was at 1923 Esplanade Drive, Richmond. The site is now the north side of the Inner Harbour Basin, in the Richmond Marina Bay, at Marina Bay Park. At the park is the Rosie the Riveter Memorial. GPS site is 37.915315°N 122.349372°W.

Built at Kaiser Richmond No. 2 Yard:

- Liberty Cargo ships, 353 model EC2-S-C1
- Haskell-class attack transports 21 Model VC2-S-AP5, a type of Victory ship
- Victory Cargo ships, 66 Model VC2-S-AP2

Notable ships: Timothy Pickering, Stephen Hopkins, Samuel Huntington, Robert T. Lincoln, Hobart Baker, Melville E. Stone, E. A. Bryan, Antoine Saugrain, and Hobbs Victory.

=== Kaiser Richmond No. 3 Yard ===
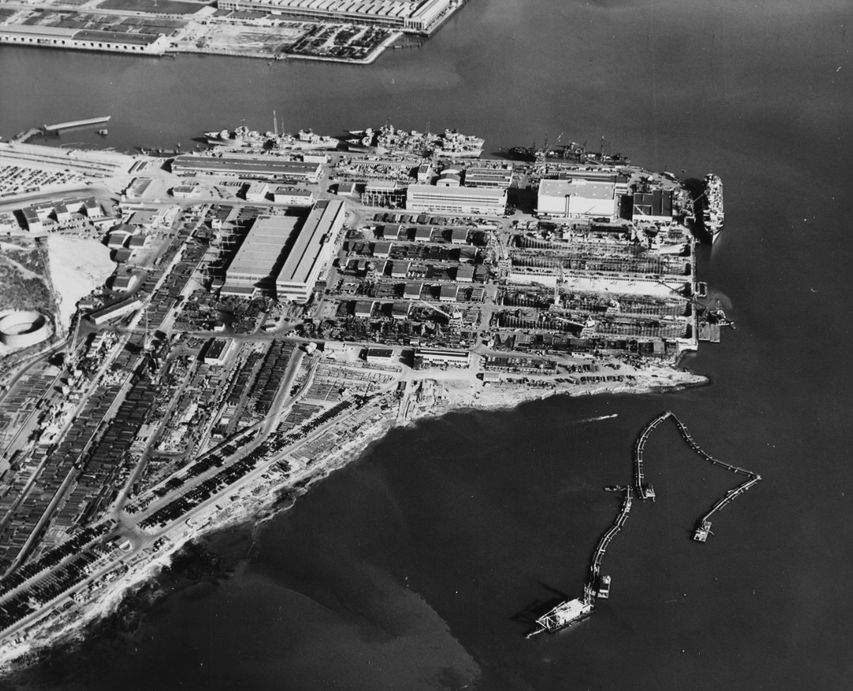
Richmond Shipyard # 3 in 1944

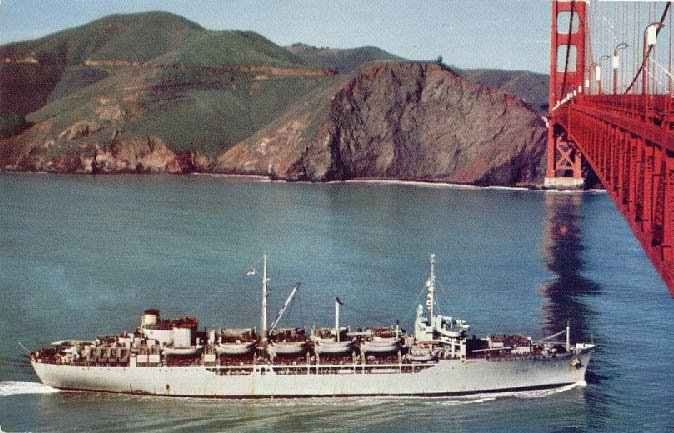
USS General C. G. Morton (AP-138) a C4 Cargo ship under the Golden Gate Bridge

Kaiser Richmond No. 3 Yard opened in 1943 and built Kaiser's largest ships, the Type C4-class ship, General G. O. Squier-class transport ships. These ships had a 12,420 GRT with a length of 523 feet (159 m). While the yard closed at the end of the war in 1946 the shipyard was not taken apart. The shipyard is still intact and there have been unsuccessful attempts to reopen the yard. Kaiser Richmond No. 3 Yard is at 1040 Canal Boulevard, Richmond at Point Potrero. At 1337 Canal Boulevard Berth 5, Richmond is the SS Red Oak Victory Cargo ship a Museum ship. Kaiser Richmond No. 3 Yard thus became the U.S. National Register of Historic Place and California Historical Landmark. At GPS 37.9054°N 122.3653°W.

Built at Kaiser Richmond No. 3 Yard:

- Type C4-class ship cargo ship, 35 model C4-S-A1.

Notable ships: USS General M. L. Hersey (AP-148) and USS General Omar Bundy (AP-152).

=== Kaiser Richmond No. 4 Yard ===
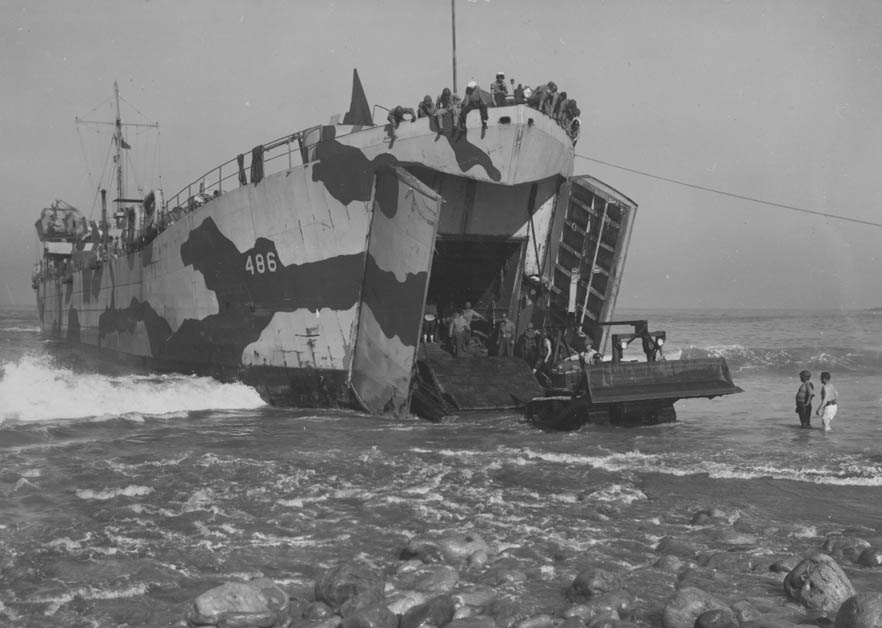
USS LST-486 training at San Clemente January 9, 1944

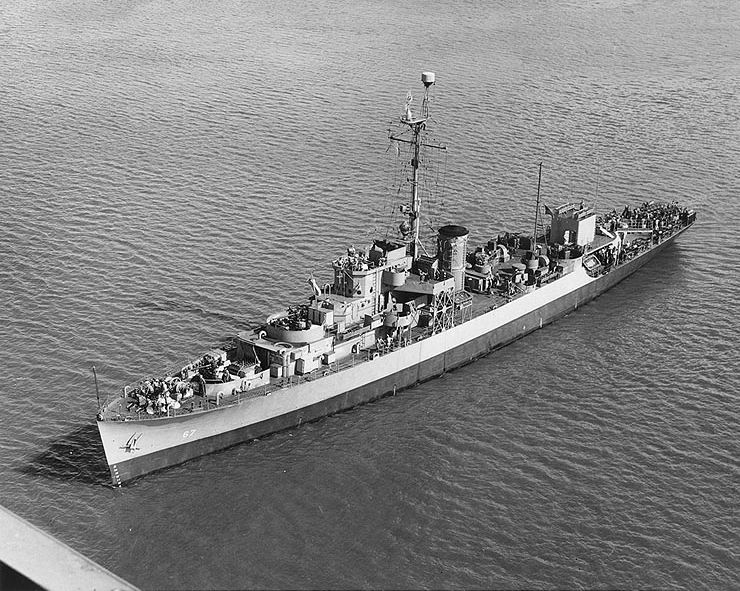
USS Peoria (PF-67) Tacoma-class frigate

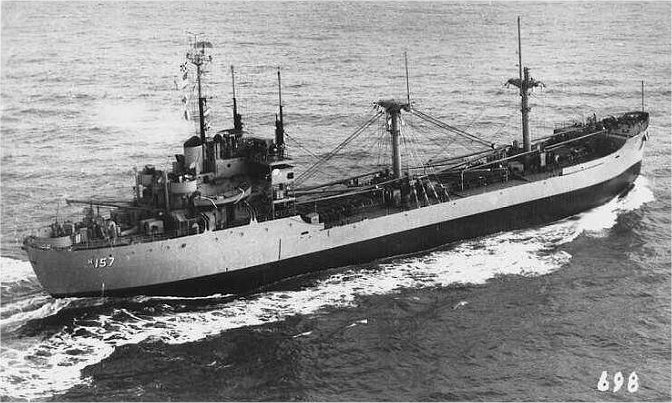
USS Alcona C1 Cargo ship

Kaiser Richmond No. 4 Yard was planned to be called Richmond #3A Yard, as just an expansion of Richmond #3. But when opened became its own shipyard with separate management. The yard opened in 1943 and closed at the end of the war in 1945. The yard was at 800 Wharf Street Richmond, on the south side of Richmond Inner Harbor Channel's Santa Fe Channel. The site now is Sugar Dock, a deepwater service port in Point Richmond. At GPS 37.9203°N 122.37186°W.

Built at Kaiser Richmond No. 4 Yard:

- Landing Ship, Tank LST model S3-M-K2, built 15 ships: LST 476 to LST 490, 4,877 GRT.
- Tacoma-class frigate 12 model S2-S2-AQ1, 7,612 GRT.
- Type C1 ship cargo 24 model C1-M-AV1, 3,805 GRT.

Notable ships: USS LST-480, USS Tacoma (PF-3), USS Pasco (PF-6), USS Fentress (AK-180), USS Beltrami and USS Blount.

== See also ==
- Frances Mary Albrier
- National Register of Historic Places listings in Contra Costa County, California
- California during World War II
