= General Steamship Company =

Shipping Company

General Steamship Company – Gensteam
- Company type: Private
- Industry: Maritime transport
- Founded: 1920
- Headquarters: Houston – San Francisco, California, Mill Valley, California
- Area served: North America
- Key people: Scott M. Jones Current CEO; R.V. Winquist; Harry H. Scott (President-(founder) 1920–1953); Captain John Barneson (founder); Captain Harry Birkholm (founder); Clarence Belknap (founder)
- Services: Passenger and Cargo Liners
- Revenue: ($48 Million)
- Number of employees: 206 employees
- Website: www.gensteam.com

General Steamship Company was founded in 1920 in Houston, Texas, United States, as a private company, and has gone by Gensteam since 1996. General Steamship Company has a fleet of cargo ships that operate worldwide. Its Gensteam Operations Desk website tracks all shipping logistics. Gensteam headquarters is now in San Francisco, California. General Steamship Company was part owner of American Pacific Steamship Company in New York and California during and after World War II. American Pacific Steamship Company was founded in 1942 in New York City and was previously called Los Angeles Tanker Operators Inc., which operated T2 tanker ships. During World War II, the General Steamship Company and American Pacific Steamship Company were active with charter shipping with the Maritime Commission and War Shipping Administration.

  - Divisions:
- General Steamship Agencies is Gensteam;s United States operation.
- Wheelhouse Shipping Agency is Gensteam's Canada operation, formed from the merger of Canadian Empire Shipping and Compass Marine in 2017.
- Alaska Maritime Agencies is Gensteam Alaska's operation, formed in 1960 as a joint venture between Kerr Steamship Company and General Steamship.

== Offices ==
- Houston, Texas
- San Francisco, California – San Francisco Bay ports
- Los Angeles (Port of Los Angeles, Port of Long Beach, Port Hueneme, Port of San Diego)
- New Orleans, Louisiana
- Baton Rouge, Louisiana
- Corpus Christi, Texas and other Texas ports
- Mobile, Alabama
- Stockton, California (Port of Stockton, Port of Sacramento)
- Columbia River ports
- Seattle
- Anchorage, Alaska
- Wheelhouse Shipping Agency Ltd, Western Canada

Gensteams is a ship agency service, ships dry dockings, military, offshore, and handles distressed vessels.

== History ==
General Steamship Company was founded by Captain John Barneson, Harry S. Scott, Captain Harry Birkholm, Clarence Belknap, and others. Harry H. Scott became the president till 1953. In the 1920s, they opened routes to the US West Coast, Far East, South Pacific Ocean, Europe, and Central America and South America. The company survived the Great Depression. During World War II, General Steamship Company operated ships for the U.S. government, British Ministry of War Transport, the Norwegian Shipping and Trade Mission, and Canadian military for the U.S. The company operated 51 T2-type tanker vessels and a total of 175 ships.

=== Los Angeles Tanker Operators, Inc. ===
Los Angeles Tanker Operators, Inc. was founded in Los Angeles, California, on July 8, 1943, by Harry H. Birkholm, Morgan Adams, A. P. Scott, Eugene Overton, W. Bruce Bryant, Leander K. Vermille, and Edward D. Lyman. Birkholm was president. W. Bruce Bryant became the district manager for General Steamship Company in 1942. Los Angeles Tanker Operators, Inc. operated a fleet of T2 tankers, type T2-SE-A2.

Liberty ship of World War II

Los Angeles Tanker Operators' fleet of ships was used to help the World War II effort. During World War II, its Merchant navy ships served the United States Shipping Board. During World War, II Los Angeles Tanker Operators was active with charter shipping with the Maritime Commission and War Shipping Administration. Los Angeles Tanker Operators operated Liberty ship tankers for the merchant navy. The ship was run by its Los Angeles Tanker Operators crew and the US Navy supplied United States Navy Armed Guards to man the deck guns and radio.

  - Some tanker ships operated for World War II:
- Charlotte P. Gilman,
- Henry C. Wallace
- Alan Seeger
- John Goode

=== General Steamship Company ships ===
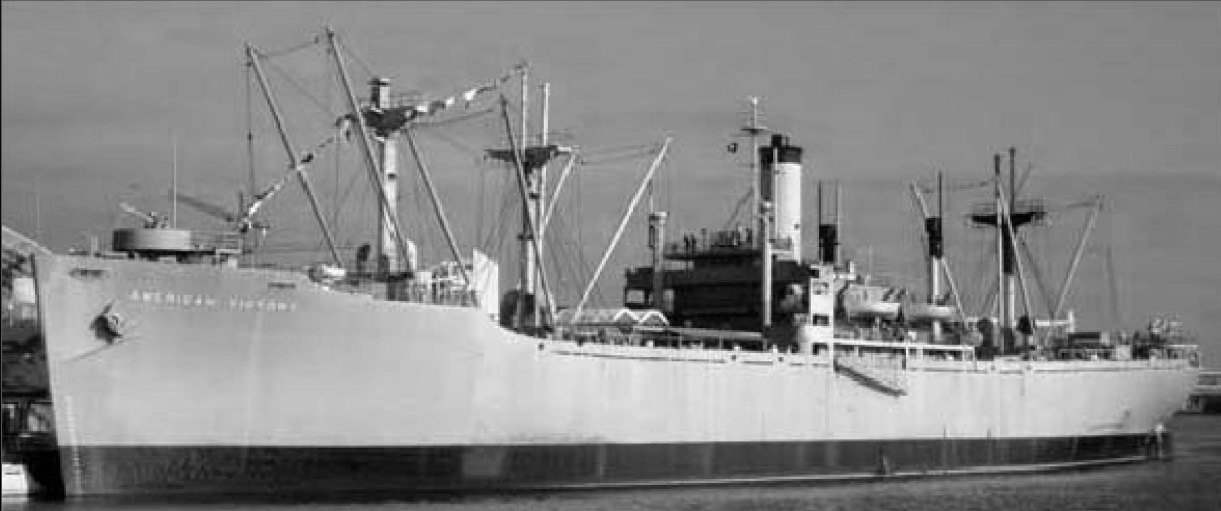
World War II Victory ship

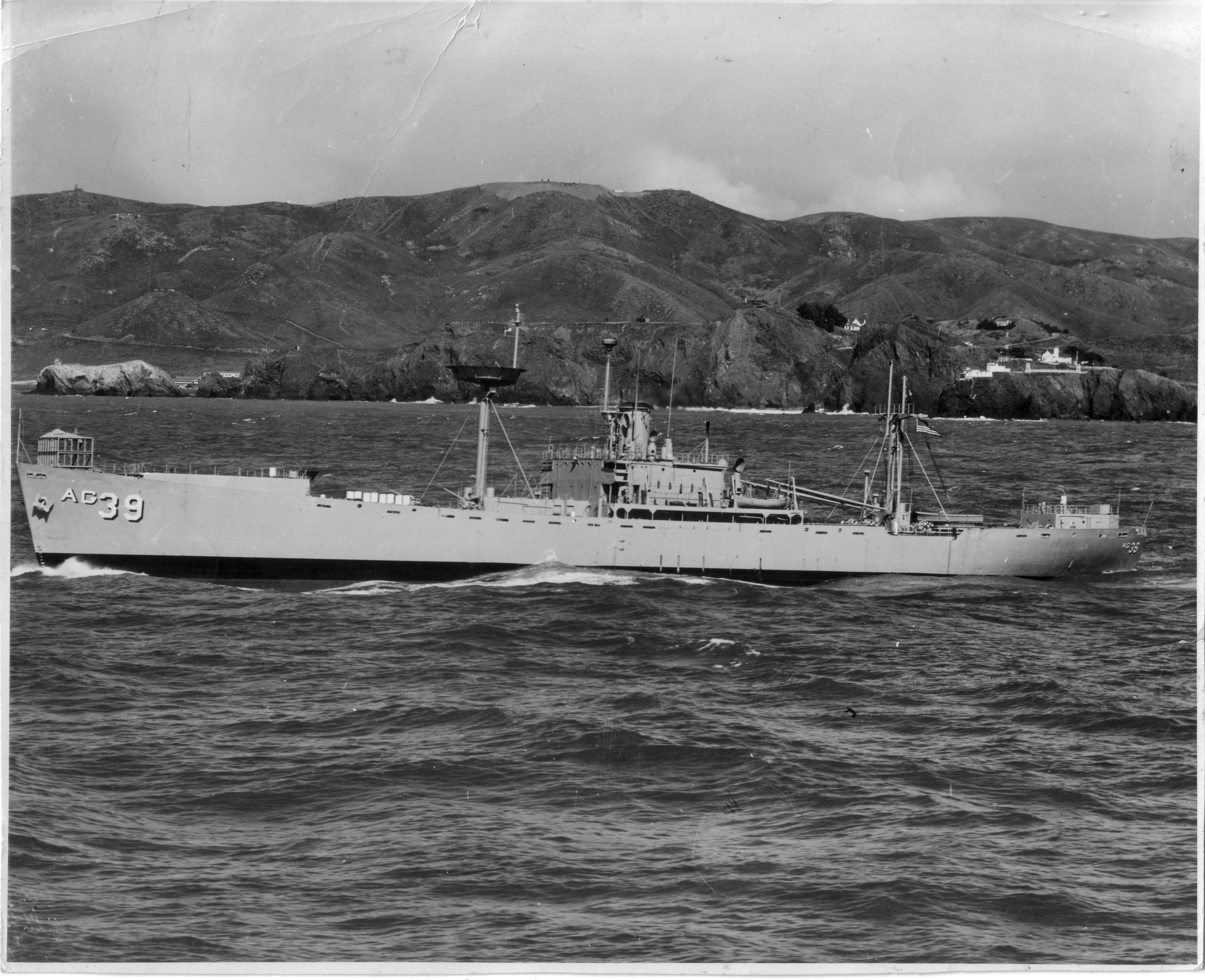
World War II Liberty ship

General Steamship Company ships owned or charted ships:

- SS Hobart Baker
- Tiger Hill
- USS Procyon (AF-61)
- USS Gwinnett (AVS-5)
- USNS Twin Falls (T-AGM-11)
- SS Enid Victory
- SS Bates Victory
- SS Lawton B. Evans
- SS Niagara Victory
- SS Waltham Victory
- SS Wooster Victory
- SS William G. Fargo
- SS Nampa Victory
- SS Phillips Victory
- SS Edward E. Hale
- SS Edward J. O'Brien
- SS John Evans
- SS John W. Searles
- SS Middlebury Victory
- SS Telfair Stockton
- USS Majaba (AG-43)
- SS Morgan Robertson
- SS Illawarra
- SS Thorl
- SD Thorsgaard
- SS Thorsisle
- SS Enid Victory
- SS Illawarra

=== American Pacific Steamship Company ===
American Pacific Steamship Company was founded in July 1943 as Los Angeles Tanker Operators, Inc. to support the World War II effort. On April 22, 1946, Los Angeles Tanker Operators, Inc. changed its name to American Pacific Steamship Company, as the line began to operate dry cargo ships, also.

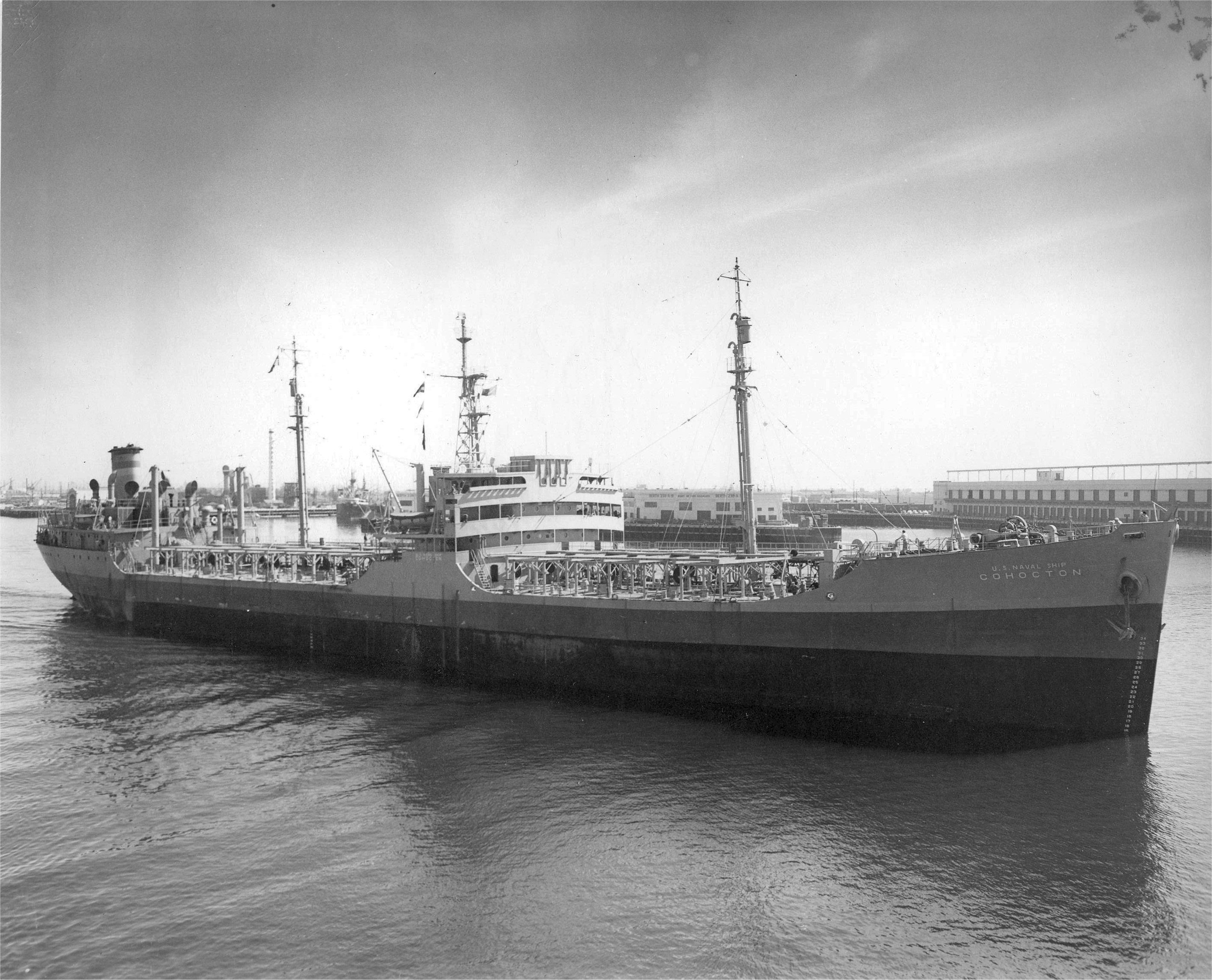
USNS Cohocton (T-AO-101), a T2 tanker

American Pacific Steamship Company Ships owned or chartered ships:

- USNT Shawnee Trail
- SS Mission San Miguel
- SS Abraham Rosenberg
- SS Alan Seeger
- SS Alexander V. Fraser
- SS Admiral Arthur P. Fairfield
- SS Idaho
- SS Chadd's Ford T2
- USS Cohocton T2
- SS Coquille T2
- SS Lookout Mountain T2
- USS Mascoma (AO-83)
- SS Mello Franco
- SS Milan R. Stefanik
- SS John Goode
- SS Samuel L. Cobb
- SS King S. Woolsey
- SS William Glackens
- SS Henry Villard
- SS Howard T. Ricketts
- SS William W. Seaton
- SS Chung Tung
- SS Donald S. Wright

=== Los Angeles Tanker Operators Inc ships ===
Ships of the Los Angeles Tanker Operators Inc.:

- USNS Mission Loreto
- USNS Mission Los Angeles
- USNS Mission Santa Clara
- USNS Mission San Rafael
- USNS Mission San Antonio
- SS Hilda Marjanne
- SS Joshua Tree
- SS Verendrye
- SS Charlotte P. Gilman
- SS Inglewood Hills
- SS Alan Seeger
- SS John Goode
- SS Henry C. Wallace

== See also ==
- World War II United States Merchant Navy
