= SS Hobart Baker =

World War II Liberty ship of the United States

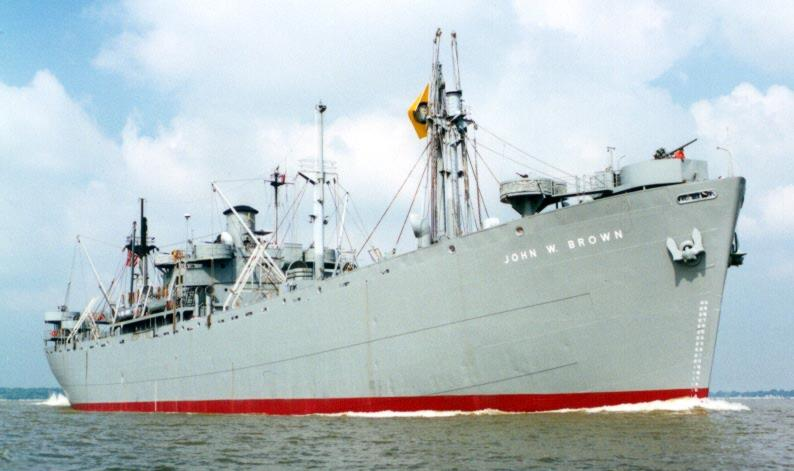
- SS John W Brown, a ship of the same class as the Hobart Baker

History

United States
- Name: Hobart Baker
- Namesake: Hobart Baker
- Owner: United States Maritime Commission
- Operator: General Steamship Company
- Builder: Permanente Metals Corp.
- Yard number: No. 2; Richmond, California
- Laid down: 16 April 1943
- Launched: 12 May 1943
- Completed: 24 May 1943
- Fate: Bombed and sank 30 December 1944
- Notes: Call sign KORP

General characteristics
- Class & type: Liberty ship; type EC2-S-C1, standard
- Tonnage: 7,176 GRT, 10,865 DWT
- Displacement: 14,245 long tons (14,474 t)
- Length: 441 feet 6 inches (135 m) oa; 416 feet (127 m) pp; 427 feet (130 m) lwl
- Beam: 57 feet (17 m)
- Draft: 27 ft 9.25 in (8.4646 m)
- Propulsion: 1 × triple-expansion steam engine, (manufactured by Joshua Hendy Iron Works, Sunnyvale, California); 1 × screw propeller
- Speed: 11.5 knots (21.3 km/h; 13.2 mph)
- Capacity: 562,608 cubic feet (15,931 m^{3}) (grain); 499,573 cubic feet (14,146 m^{3}) (bale)
- Troops: 550
- Complement: 38–62 USMM; 21–40 USNAG
- Armament: Varied by ship; Bow-mounted 3-inch (76 mm)/50-caliber gun; Stern-mounted 4-inch (102 mm)/50-caliber gun; 2–8 × single 20-millimeter (0.79 in) Oerlikon anti-aircraft (AA) cannons and/or, 2–8 × 37-millimeter (1.46 in) M1 AA guns

SS Hobart Baker was a Liberty ship built for the United States Maritime Commission during World War II. The ship was named in honor of Hobart Baker. Hobart "Hobey" Baker (1892–1918) was an American amateur athlete and is considered the first American star in ice hockey. He was also an American football player. The ship was assigned by the War Shipping Administration to General Steamship Company of San Francisco who operated it throughout World War II. Hobart Baker was laid down on 16 April 1943, launched on 12 May 1943 and completed on 24 May 1943, with the hull No. 1114 as part of the Emergency Shipbuilding Program, built in 38 days.

== World war 2 ==
SS Hobart Baker was loaded with supplies for the Pacific Ocean theater of World War II on 26 October 1944 by the 2486th Quartermaster Truck Company in San Francisco. Due to the need for supplies, she was loaded around the clock. Military vehicles were driven to the Hobart Baker from the 15th Aircraft Delivery Group (ADG) Motorpool. The vehicles were chained down in the cargo holds. Most of the vehicles were amphibious. She was also loaded with steel landing mats (Marston Mats), fuel and other supplies needed for an amphibious beach assault.

SS Hobart Baker joined a one hundred ship convoy, TG 77.11, that was under the command of Captain J. B. McLean. The convoy was screened and protected by nine destroyers. The convoy headed to Mindoro, an island in Luzon of the Philippines, to support the Battle of Mindoro. It arrived on December 28, and was immediately attacked. The PT tender USS Orestes was the first kamikaze hit. Liberty ship SS William Sharon was hit, resulting in a large fire on her superstructure and killing 11 crew, but stayed afloat and was repaired. LST-750 sank later in the day. On the morning of December 30, 1944, the convoy arrived Mangarin Bay with the goal unloading and departing in the same day. Unload progressed smoothly until 3:40 pm, when five Imperial Japanese Navy (IJN) Aichi D3As began suicide attacks. The destroyers USS Gansevoort (DD-608), USS Pringle (DD-477), and USS Porcupine were hit. The SS Francisco Morozan was damaged when a kamikaze plane exploded over the ship after it was shot down by US Navy plane. SS James H. Breasted sank with no lose of crew.

Hobart Baker was hit by two aerial bombs and sank at 12°17'55"N, 121°04'47"E. Wounded were two of the 26-man US Navy Armed Guard. Of the 38 man merchant crew one was killed and one was wounded.

The Battle of Mindoro was costly for the US Merchant Marines, with more Merchant Marines killed than Army or Navy fighters. Two Liberty ships, the SS John Burke and SS Lewis L. Dyche were bombed and sank with all crew members killed. The Liberty ship SS Juan de Fuca was hit by Navy shells and a kamikaze plane, strafed by Zeros, and was ultimately beached by her Captain to prevent the ship from sinking. The ship was later repaired. The SS John M. Clayton was torpedoed and hit by a bomb, and she was beached by her Captain to prevent the ship from sinking, as cargo was on fire and half her of the superstructure was gone.

== See also ==
- Allied technological cooperation during World War II
- List of Liberty ships
- Type C1 ship
- Type C2 ship
- Victory ship
- U.S. Merchant Marine Academy
