= SS Enid Victory =

Victory ship of the United States

- Typical Victory ship

History

United States
- Name: Enid Victory
- Namesake: Enid, Oklahoma
- Owner: War Shipping Administration
- Operator: General Steamship Company
- Builder: Permanente Metals Corporation, Richmond, California
- Launched: 27 June 1945
- Sponsored by: Marie Michau-Jordaan
- Christened: 27 June 1945
- Identification: IMO number: 5104423
- Fate: Sold for scrap 16 August 1993

General characteristics
- Class & type: VC2-S-AP3 Victory ship
- Tonnage: 7,612 GRT; 4,553 NRT
- Displacement: 15,200 tons
- Length: 455 ft (139 m)
- Beam: 62 ft (19 m)
- Draught: 28 ft (8.5 m)
- Installed power: 8,500 shp (6,300 kW)
- Propulsion: HP & LP turbines geared to a single 20.5-foot (6.2 m) propeller
- Speed: 16.5 knots (30.6 km/h; 19.0 mph)
- Boats & landing craft carried: 4 lifeboats
- Complement: 62 Merchant Marine and 28 US Naval Armed Guards
- Armament: 1 × 5 in (127 mm)/38 caliber gun; 1 × 3 in (76 mm)/50 caliber gun; 8 × 20 mm Oerlikon

SS Enid Victory (MCV-712), was a type VC2-S-AP2 Victory ship built by Permanente Metals Corporation, Yard 2, of Richmond, California. The Maritime Administration cargo ship was named after Enid, Oklahoma. It was the 730th ship built at the Kaiser yards. Its keel was laid on 17 May 1945. The ship was christened on 27 June 1945, with Enid Mayor Luther A. Wells in attendance. The ship was in service during World War II, Korea War, and the Vietnam War.

== World War II ==
For World War II Enid Victory was operated by the General SS Company under the United States Merchant Marine act for the War Shipping Administration. She had United States Navy Armed Guard to man the deck guns. She served in the Asiatic-Pacific Theater of war. In Oct. 1945 she supplied good for the Battle of Leyte, including the United States Navy ocean tug USS ATR-31.

== Korean War ==
After World War II the ship was laid up at the Hudson River United States Maritime Administration facility on 7 October 1949. During the Hŭngnam evacuation on 10 December 1950, Enid Victory, serving as a chartered Military Sea Transportation Service vessel, cut the eastern point of the harbor too close and ran aground. The one-foot tide of the Sea of Japan made it difficult, but by next afternoon the ARL Askari, the fleet tug Tawakoni, and two harbor tugs managed free the ship, and she continued to Pusan. In February 1952, the SS Enid Victory returned 280 bodies of fallen servicemen home to the United States.

== Post war ==
In 1955 the ship was used to determine best shipping routes based on marine weather forecasts. The Enid Victory followed a path that was based on these forecasts while control ships went more conventional routes. For the first of these, the Enid Victory departed La Pallice, France and a control ship, the SS Monroe Victory, departed from Liverpool, England, on 7 January 1955, bound for New York City. The Enid Victory arrived at New York on 17 January 1955, traveling a distance of 3,318 miles at an average speed of 14.57 knots. On 19 January 1955, the Monroe Victory arrived in New York, 2 days, 18 hours and 54 minutes later. This ship had also traveled 3,318 miles but its speed on the standard route was only 11.30 knots. On 15 November 1956, Lykes Brothers chartered the Enid Victory from the United States at Norfolk, Virginia.

== Vietnam War ==
Enid Victory was reactivated during the Vietnam War. The ship had been held in reserve in Houston, Texas and underwent $257,000 worth of topside and internal reconditioning. While en route to Vietnam and serving as an ammunition ship, an explosion occurred in the engine room and killed the second assistant engineer. While in the Subic Bay, Philippines, the USS Tillamook (ATA-192) answered the call for a rescue mission with only the duty section embarked. The call came in around 2200 on 20 December 1966, and the tug got under way immediately to rendezvous with SS Enid Victory which was unable to return to port because of a damaged steering engine. The Tillamook brought the merchantman safely back to Subic Bay.

== Retirement ==
By 1974, the ship was again mothballed at Beaumont, Texas. The Enid Victory was sold for scrap on 16 August 1993.

== See also ==
- List of Victory ships
- Liberty ship
- Type C1 ship
- Type C2 ship
- Type C3 ship
