= SS Hilda Marjanne =

Canadian straight deck bulk carrier operating on the Great Lakes

History
- Name: Grande Ronde (1943–1948); Kate N.L. (1948–1960); Hilda Marjanne (1960–1983)
- Operator: Los Angeles Tanker Operations, Inc., USA (1943–1948); Cephalonian Maritime Company, Greece (1948–1960); Leitch Transport Ltd., Canada (1960–1983)
- Builder: Kaiser Shipyards, Swan Island, Oregon
- Yard number: 43
- Laid down: 22 October 1943
- Launched: 9 December 1943
- Completed: 24 December 1943
- Refit: Schlieker-Werft, West Germany, 1960-1961
- Identification: IMO number: 5150549
- Fate: Broken up, and partially incorporated into a new ship, 1983

General characteristics (after 1961 rebuild)
- Type: Bulk carrier
- Tonnage: 16,628 GT; 25,600 DWT
- Length: 730 ft 5 in (222.63 m) o/a
- Beam: 75 ft (23 m)
- Depth: 39 ft 3 in (11.96 m)

Hilda Marjanne was a Canadian straight deck bulk carrier operating on the Great Lakes.

== Ship history ==
=== Oil tanker ===
The ship was built at the Kaiser Shipyard in Swan Island, Oregon, for the U.S. Maritime Commission as a Type T2-SE-A1 tanker and launched on 9 December 1943 as the Grande Ronde.

Grande Ronde was chartered to Los Angeles Tanker Operations, Inc. of Los Angeles, California, for wartime service, primarily in the Pacific Theater. This ship was 523 ft 6 in (159.56 m) o/a, with a beam of 68 ft (21 m) and 39 ft 3 in (11.96 m) deep. Powered by a 7,240 shp (5,399 kW) GE steam turbine engine, she had a deadweight tonnage of 16,600 tons and a capacity of 141,200 US bbl (16,840,000 L; 4,450,000 US gal; 3,700,000 imp gal) of fuel oil.

In 1948 the Grande Ronde was sold to the Cephalonian Maritime Company of Athens, Greece. Renamed Kate N.L. she operated in the Mediterranean Sea transporting petroleum products.

=== Bulk carrier ===
In 1960 she was sold to Leitch Transport Ltd. of Toronto, Ontario, and towed to the Schlieker-Werft shipyard in Hamburg, West Germany, to be converted to a bulk carrier. The ship was extended to 730 ft 5 in (222.63 m), with a beam of 75 ft (23 m) giving her a deadweight tonnage of 25,600 tons.

The ship, renamed Hilda Marjanne, returned to Canada in August 1961 for service on the Great Lakes transporting grain and iron ore.

In 1975 she was one of three ships called to aid the search for survivors from the ill-fated SS Edmund Fitzgerald which had gone down; but stormy weather forced her to abandon her efforts leaving just the SS William Clay Ford and the SS Arthur M. Anderson to continue the search.

Hilda Marjanne was laid up at Hamilton, Ontario on 13 June 1983. The bows and midsection (minus the forward wheelhouse, stern accommodations and machinery) of Hilda Marjanne were then joined to the stern section of the freighter Chimo at the Port Weller Dry Docks, St. Catharines, Ontario. The remaining unwanted sections of both ships were scrapped. The new ship was completed on 5 April 1984, as the bulk carrier Canadian Ranger, which served as a grain transporter until laid up in 2008. She was scrapped in Aliağa, Turkey, in 2011.
