= USS Tillamook (ATA-192) =

United States Navy tugboat

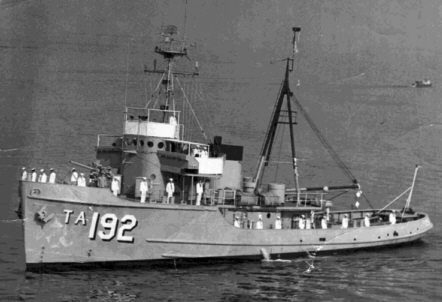
- USS Tillamook

History

United States
- Name: USS Tillamook
- Namesake: The Tillamook, a large and prominent Coast Salish Native American tribe which occupied the shores of Tillamook Bay and its tributary rivers in northwestern Oregon
- Builder: Levingston Shipbuilding Corporation, Orange, Texas
- Laid down: 19 October 1944
- Launched: 15 November 1944
- Commissioned: 23 January 1945
- Decommissioned: 1 July 1971
- Renamed: From USS ATA-192 to USS Tillamook (ATA-192) 16 July 1948
- Stricken: 15 April 1976
- Honors and awards: Nine campaign stars for Vietnam War service
- Fate: Leased to Republic of Korea 1 July 1971; Served in Republic of Korea Coast and Gedodetic Survey 1971-1976; Returned to U.S. Navy 1976 and sold

General characteristics
- Type: Tug
- Displacement: 610 tons (light); 830 tons (full load)
- Length: 143 ft 0 in (43.59 m)
- Beam: 33 ft 10 in (10.31 m)
- Draft: 13 ft 2 in (4.01 m)
- Installed power: 1,500 shaft horsepower (2 megawatts)
- Propulsion: Two General Motors 12-278A diesel-electric engines, single screw
- Speed: 12.5 knots; 13.0 knots (trial) (trial)
- Complement: 20
- Armament: 1 × single 3"/50 dual-purpose gun mount; 2 × single 20 mm antiaircraft gun mounts

The third USS Tillamook (ATA-192), originally USS ATA-192, a United States Navy tug in service from 1945 to 1971.

== Construction and commissioning ==
Tillamook was laid down as ATA-192 on 19 October 1944 by the Levingston Shipbuilding Corporation at Orange, Texas, and launched on 15 November 1944. She was commissioned as USS ATA-192 on 23 January 1945.

== World War II ==
After shakedown training in the Gulf of Mexico, ATA-192 departed Galveston, Texas, on 21 February 1945, transited the Panama Canal on 28 February 1945, and headed north. After visits to Acapulco, Mexico; San Diego, California; and Portland, Oregon, ATA-192 arrived in Pearl Harbor, Territory of Hawaii, on 28 April 1945. On 10 May 1945, she departed Pearl Harbor for duty in the western Pacific.

During the waning days of World War II, ATA-192 towed ships between various anchorages in the western Pacific. She visited Guam late in June 1945 and Okinawa in mid-July 1945. From there, she moved south to Leyte in the Philippine Islands, where she remained from 20 to 30 July 1945. Early in August 1945, she headed eastward and proceeded via Ulithi Atoll and Pearl Harbor to the United States West Coast. She arrived in San Francisco, California, on 1 September 1945.

== Operation Crossroads ==
After almost a month in port at San Francisco, ATA—192 got underway for Pearl Harbor, bound for the atomic bomb tests at Bikini Atoll in the Marshall Islands. She spent four months in the Marshall Islands during Operation Crossroads, the designation for the tests, ferrying personnel, helping fight fires caused by the tests, and, on one occasion, towing the former Imperial Japanese Navy battleship Nagato, in use as a target ship for the tests. During her stay in the Marshall Islands, ATA-192 also was a frequent visitor to Kwajalein Atoll and Eniwetok Atoll. On 8 September 1946, she left Kwajalein Lagoon to return to the United States. After a five-day stopover at Pearl Harbor, she reached San Francisco on 12 October 1946 and began the procedure for her post-test radiation contamination clearance.

== Service in the Territory of Alaska ==
On 15 November 1946, ATA-192 departed San Francisco and headed north. After stops at Bremerton and Seattle, Washington, she arrived at Kodiak, Territory of Alaska, on 1 January 1946 to begin an extended tour of duty in the 17th Naval District. In February 1947, she underwent repairs at Puget Sound Naval Shipyard in Bremerton, and, early in March 1947, she returned to Alaskan waters. Over the next 10 years, she steamed between various ports in Alaska and along the Aleutian Islands chain.

The name Tillamook became free in 1947 when the old tug USS Tillamook (YTM-122) was retired, and, on 31 May 1948, ATA-192 was named USS Tillamook (ATA-192).

Until 25 April 1952, Tillamook operated out of the City of Kodiak/Kodiak Island [17th Naval District], when she began operations out of Naval Station Adak, Alaska in the Aleutian Islands. In addition to the usual towing operations she performed, Tillamook also conducted search and rescue missions in the cold and treacherous waters of the Bering Sea, as well as humanitarian work for Native Alaskans. Her clandestine mission was electronic and visual surveillance of Soviet [spy] vessels penetrating U.S. Territorial Waters, including Soviet spy vessels disguised as fishing trawlers and fish factory ships.

== Pacific Fleet service ==
On 27 May 1957, Tillamook was ordered to be decommissioned and placed in reserve. However, that order was rescinded on the following day, and she was reassigned to the Pacific Fleet for duty with the Service Force, United States Pacific Fleet.

From then until well into the fall of 1960, the tug was homeported at Pearl Harbor and conducted towing operations for the Pacific Fleet Service Force.

== Seventh Fleet service ==
In November 1960, Tillamook was reassigned again, this time to East Asian waters guarded by the United States Seventh Fleet. On 17 November 1960, she reached Japan at her new home port, Yokosuka.

During her first four years in the western Pacific, Tillamook performed towing operations between such bases as Sasebo and Yokosuka, Japan, and Subic Bay on Luzon in the Philippines. The highlight of this period of duty was a visit to Sihanoukville, Cambodia, in April 1962.

=== Vietnam War ===
Late in 1964, when the American presence in South Vietnam began to increase, Tillamook also began to visit the ports of that country. However, her missions in Vietnamese waters in 1964 were brief port visits to deliver tows at such places as Da Nang and Vung Tau, South Vietnam.

Shortly after the Gulf of Tonkin incident in August 1964, the US Navy developed a training exercise to simulate firing on small, high-speed targets at night and Tillamook was assigned to participate off Subic Bay. Tillmook would tow the sled in one direction at top speed—just over 11 knots—while a destroyer steamed in the opposite direction at something close to top speed—something close to 30 knots—creating a relative closing speed of about 40 knots. On the first two nights, the destroyers illuminated the tow with their star shells, locked the turrets on the two, but did not fire. On several occasions, the star shells illuminated Tillamook. On the third night, a destroyer commenced a live exercise, but also placed the star shells over Tillamook rather than over the tow. Shortly thereafter, the crew on Tillamook heard the destroyer radioman announced "Shot, out"—it was on the way. A few second later, a salvo of fire shattered about 50-100 yards short of Tillamook and then before the crew could react, a second salvo was on the way that landed about 50-100 yards long. Although the salvos missed, shrapnel hit the side of Tillamook, and the crew collected them in a box and gave them to the destroyer as a present the following day while delivering the mail to the fleet.

In February 1965, she assisted the disabled United States Coast Guard Cutter USCGC Chautauqua into Yokosuka for repairs. Chatauqua was at Ocean Station Victor, approximately 1100 miles east of Yokosuka and was adrift, having lost its main bearing. Tillamook had been providing gunnery sled services, and had her lightweight 1" wire on the towing reel. Rather than take the time to replace the lightweight wire with the standard 2" towing wire, the skipper left immediately leaving the liberty section ashore. Because of the lightweight wire, Tillamook was unable to use full power and it was a long slog back to Yokosuka into a gale. During one 24-hour period, Tillamook actually averaged negative nautical miles for the day.

In April 1965, she was assigned to Operation Market Time along the coast of Vietnam, that was designed to interdict enemy infiltration and coastwise logistics operations. A Republic of Vietnam Navy patrol boat, RVNS PC-04, had caught an enemy "trawler" unloading weapons at Vung Ro Bay, South Vietnam and there was growing concern with enemy coastal traffic. In July 1965, Tillamook entered Vung Ro Bay about midnight based on reports from her Vietnamese liaison that a RVN outpost had been captured by the Viet Cong, the idea being to use Tillamook's 3 inch 50 single gun to attack the outpost. After slinking quietly in the cove, the Captain ordered the First Lieutenant to anchor, whereupon the First lieutenant opened the wrong pelican hook, sending the spare anchor splashing into the sea. With that, Tillamook departed the cove without firing.

In August 1965, she resumed operations towing district and landing craft between various East Asian bases and did not return to Vietnamese waters until December 1965 when she towed the large covered lighter USS YFNB-2 and the floating workshop USS YR-71 from Subic Bay to Danang. She visited South Vietnam again in January 1966 when she towed a barge into Cam Ranh Bay.

After another period of towing operations outside the combat zone, Tillamook rejoined the American naval forces in Vietnam in August 1966. She provided gunfire support for forces operating on the Long Tau branch of the Saigon River.

In December 1966, while attempting to retrieve a drifting barge, four of Tillamook's crew became separated from the ship. In the night, the barge drifted ashore, and Tillamook provided covering fire through the night to protect the four sailors from nearby enemy troops. The following morning, a small landing craft rescued the men. Tillamook returned to Subic Bay soon thereafter.

While at Subic Bay, Tillamook answered a call for a rescue mission with only the duty section embarked. The call came in around 22:00 one evening, and she got underway immediately to rendezvous with the merchant ship SS Enid Victory, which was unable to return to port because of a damaged engine. Tillamook brought Enid Victory safely back to Subic Bay.

During 1967, Tillamook made three short visits to South Vietnam, one to Vung Tau in mid-March, another to Da Nang in late June, and the third to Vung Tau again early in December. However, she spent most of 1967 occupied with routine operations in Japanese and Philippine waters.

Tillamook also spent 1968 in much the same way, though highlighted by a visit to Da Nang in January, to Singapore and to Da Nang in June and to Da Nang in September.

In 1969 and 1970, Tillamook made only four brief stops in Vietnam, at either Vung Tau or Da Nang. Her routine of tows between Japan and the Philippines was broken only by an escort mission to Keelung, Taiwan, in mid-September 1970.

==== Honors and awards ====
Tillamook received nine campaign stars for her Vietnam War service, for:

- Vietnam Defense, 18 to 25 August 1965, 7 to 15 September 1965, and 24 December 1965
- Vietnam Counteroffensive, 25 to 26 December 1965 and 8 to 20 April 1966
- Vietnam Counteroffensive - Phase II, 6 to 8 August 1966
- Vietnam Counteroffensive - Phase IV, 25 May to 2 June 1968 and 8 to 23 June 1968
- Vietnam Counteroffensive - Phase V, 21 July to 26 September 1968 and 3 to 7 October 1968
- Vietnam Counteroffensive - Phase VI, 21 to 22 February 1969
- Tet 69/Counteroffensive, 23 to 28 February 1969
- Vietnam Summer-Fall 1969, 6 to 14 July 1969 and 17 to 24 July 1969
- Vietnam Counteroffensive - Phase VII, 16 to 25 November 1970

=== Final operations ===
In January and February 1971, Tillamook operated in Japanese waters out of Yokosuka. Early in March 1971, she made another round-trip voyage to Keelung and returned to Japan at Sasebo on 19 March 1971. On 20 March 1971, she began a voyage that took her to Pusan, South Korea, and Buckner Bay, Okinawa, before she returned to Yokosuka on 28 March 1971. She remained in port in Yokosuka until her decommissioning.

== Decommissioning and final disposition ==
On 1 July 1971, Tillamook was decommissioned at Yokosuka and was leased to the Republic of Korea under the provisions of the Military Assistance Program. She served the Republic of Korea Coast and Geodetic Survey until 1976 when South Korea returned her to the U.S. Navy for final disposition.

Tillamook's name was stricken from the Navy List on 15 April 1976 and disposed of by unrecorded means the same day.
