= Lawton B. Evans =

American educator and author (1862–1934)

Lawton Bryan Evans
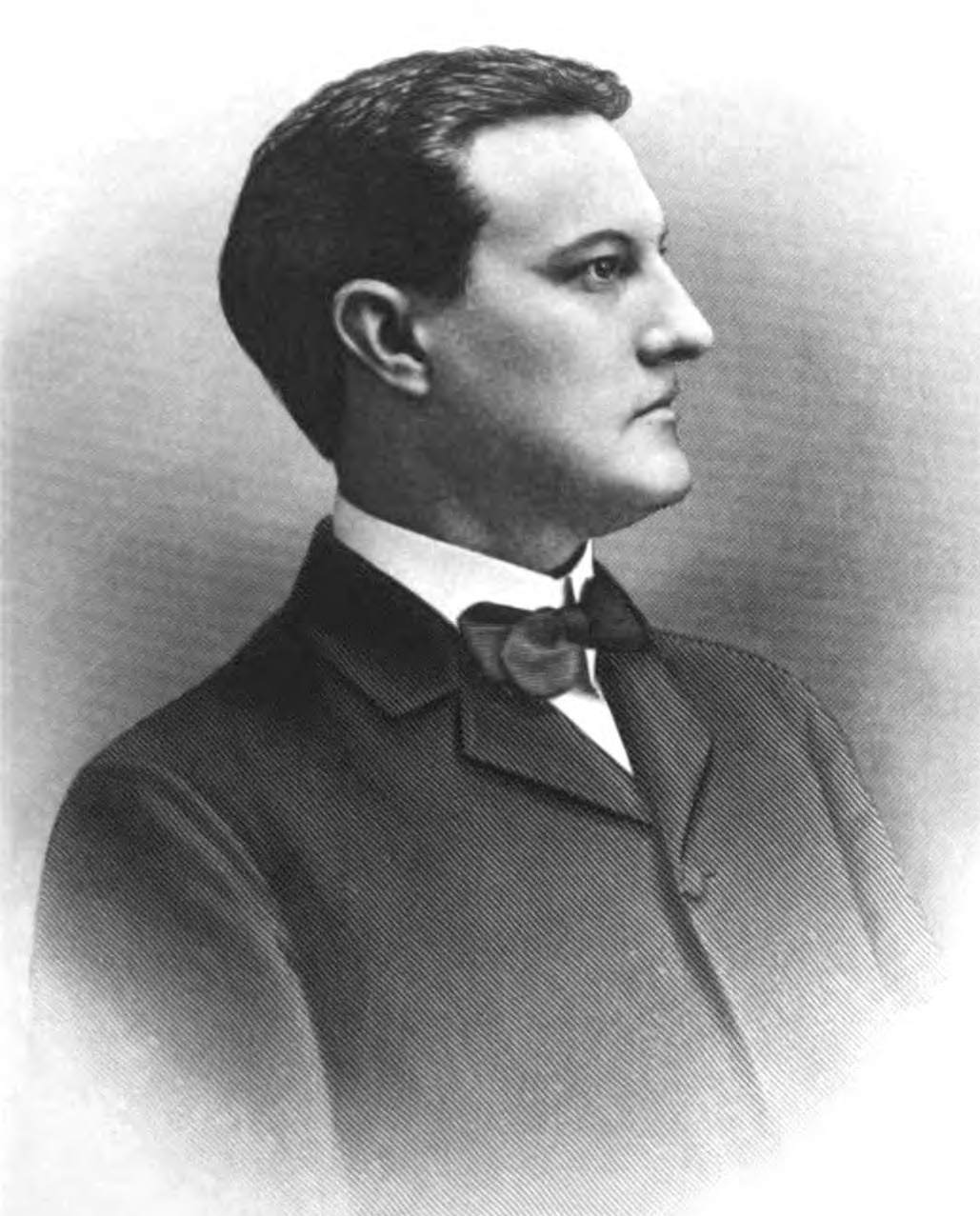
- Evans in 1910
- Born: October 27, 1862; Lumpkin, Georgia, United States
- Died: April 6, 1934 (aged 71); Atlanta, Georgia, United States
- Occupations: Educator, author, school administrator
- Known for: Georgia history textbooks; Superintendent of Schools, Richmond County

Signature
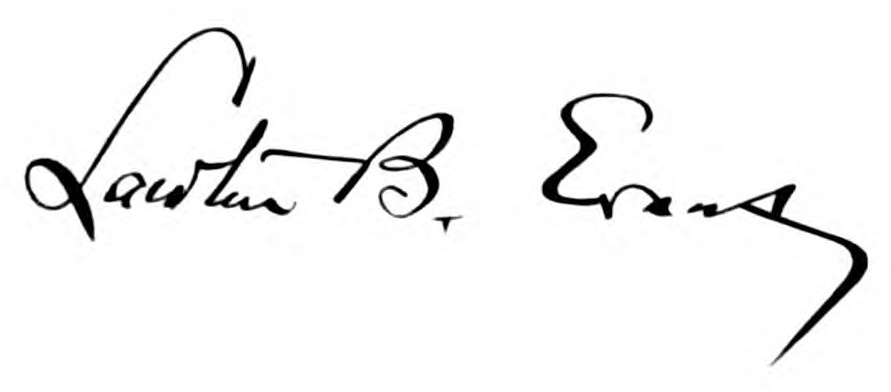

Lawton Bryan Evans (October 27, 1862 – April 6, 1934) was an American educator, author, and school administrator best known for his influential history textbooks used in Georgia schools in the late 19th and early 20th centuries. He served for many years as superintendent of schools in Richmond County, Georgia, and authored some of the earliest widely adopted state history textbooks. His educational contributions were later commemorated by the naming of a World War II Liberty ship, the SS Lawton B. Evans, in his honor.

== Early life and education ==
Lawton Bryan Evans was born on October 27, 1862, in Georgia, the son of Clement Anselm Evans, a prominent lawyer, Confederate general, Methodist minister, and later a judge and historian.

Evans was educated at Emory College, where he earned his bachelor's degree, and later at the University of Georgia, where he completed a master's degree by 1881.

== Career in education ==
Evans began his professional career as a teacher before moving into educational administration. In 1882, at the age of nineteen, he was elected superintendent of schools for Richmond County, Georgia, a position he held for many years.

During his tenure, Evans oversaw curriculum development, teacher training, and school expansion in the Augusta area. He was regarded as a progressive administrator and a strong advocate for structured historical education in public schools.

== Authorship and textbooks ==
Evans is best known as the author of some of Georgia's earliest and most widely used state history textbooks. His works were adopted throughout the state and remained in use for decades.

His first major work, The Student's History of Georgia: From the Earliest Discoveries and Settlements to the End of the Year 1883 (Macon, Georgia: J. W. Burke and Co., 1884), was published in 1884 and is considered one of the earliest comprehensive Georgia history textbooks written specifically for school use.

Readable pdf of America first; one hundred stories from our own history

His most influential publication, A History of Georgia for Use in Schools, was first published in 1898 and went through multiple editions, including revised printings in 1900 and 1908. The book became a standard text in Georgia classrooms and is now in the public domain.

Evans also authored First Lessons in Georgia History (1913), designed for younger students, as well as First Lessons in American History and The Essential Facts of American History, which were used as introductory texts in elementary education.

In addition to formal textbooks, Evans published juvenile and moral instruction works, including America First: One Hundred Stories from Our Own History, Worth While Stories for Every Day, and Old Time Tales, which combined historical narrative with character education.

== Legacy and recognition ==
Evans's textbooks played a major role in shaping how Georgia history was taught during the late 19th and early 20th centuries. His approach emphasized civic pride, moral instruction, and regional identity, reflecting broader trends in Progressive Era education.

In recognition of his contributions, the United States Maritime Commission named a Liberty ship, the SS Lawton B. Evans, in his honor during World War II.

== Personal life ==
Evans was married to Florence Campbell (died 1932) of Augusta. They had three children: Sarah, Lawton Junior and Clement Anselm.

== Death ==
Lawton Bryan Evans died on April 6, 1934, in Atlanta, Georgia.
