= USS Majaba =

Cargo ship of the United States Navy

- Majaba sister ship SS Point Bonita

History

United States
- Name: Meriden (1919—1923); El Capitan (1923-1942); Majaba (1942-1946)
- Namesake: An island of the Philippines
- Owner: United States Shipping Board (1919—1920); General Steamship Corporation (1920-1923); E. K. Wood Lumber Co. (1923—1945); U.S. Maritime Commission (1945-1946)
- Operator: United States Shipping Board (1919—1920); General Steamship Corporation (1920-1923); E. K. Wood Lumber Co. (1923—1943); U.S. Navy (1943-1946)
- Builder: Albina Engine & Machine Works, Portland, Oregon
- Cost: $821,751.56
- Yard number: 16
- Launched: 22 May 1919
- Completed: 1919 as Meriden
- Acquired: Chartered by the US Navy as El Capitan
- Commissioned: 23 April 1942 as Majaba (AG-43)
- Decommissioned: 1 July 1943
- In service: 1 July 1943 as Majaba (IX-102)
- Out of service: 14 March 1946, at Subic Bay
- Stricken: 28 March 1946
- Identification: U.S. Official Number: 218284; Signal: LRPB (Meriden); KILP (El Capitan)
- Honours and awards: 1 battle star for World War II service.
- Fate: Sank at pier, Philippines, 1946

General characteristics
- Type: Design 1049 "Albinia Type" cargo ship
- Tonnage: 2,254 GRT, 1,353 NRT, 3,700 DWT
- Displacement: 5,070 tons
- Length: 300 ft (91.4 m) length overall; 289 ft (88.1 m) in registry
- Beam: 44.1 ft (13.4 m)
- Draft: 17 ft 11 in (5.5 m)
- Depth: 19.2 ft (5.9 m)
- Propulsion: Triple expansion steam, single propeller
- Speed: 12 knots
- Armament: one single 3 in (76 mm) gun mount

USS Majaba (AG-43/IX-102) was the Design 1049 cargo ship Meriden built in 1919 by the Albina Engine & Machine Works, Portland, Oregon. All the ships were requisitioned by the United States Shipping Board (USSB) for World War I service. The ship was bought by the E. K. Wood Lumber Co., of San Francisco, California in 1923 and renamed El Capitan. The ship was chartered by the U.S. Navy through the War Shipping Administration (WSA) in April 1942 and commissioned as Majaba.

Majaba was assigned to operations in the South Pacific Ocean and at Guadalcanal she was struck by a torpedo and beached. After salvage, towing, removal of engines and repair at Tulagi the ship served as a barracks, storage ship and repair ship until the end of the war. In October 1945 WSA requisitioned the title from the owner. Majaba continued service at Tulagi until she was towed to the Philippines in 1945. The ship was redelivered to WSA on 14 March 1946, placed in the reserve fleet at Subic Bay and declared a loss. On 14 July 1946 the hull sank at the pier and declared not salvageable.

== Construction ==
Meriden was built in 1919 by Albina Engine & Machine Works, Portland, Oregon. The designation Emergency Fleet Corporation (EFC) Design 1049 "Albinia Type" ship was applied to an existing Albina design after the United States Shipping Board (USSB) requisitioned the ships. The hull was Albina's yard hull number 16, USSB/EFC hull number 2249. Meriden, with U.S. Official Number 218284, signal LRPB, home port of San Francisco with registered crew size of 32.

The type was 2,254 GRT, 1,353 NRT, 3,700 DWT, 289 ft (88.1 m) in registry length, 44.1 ft (13.4 m) beam and 19.2 ft (5.9 m) draft. The ship was oil fired with triple expansion steam engines.

== Commercial operation ==
The vessel was delivered to USSB operations 22 July 1919 and operated as a USSB vessel until 1920. General Steamship Corporation purchased the ship, originally costing $821,751.56, for $717,800 in a combination of cash and mortgage taking delivery on 28 May 1920. In 1923 the ship was acquired by E. K. Wood Lumber Co., of San Francisco, California and renamed El Capitan. As El Capitan the ship is shown with signal KILP.

General Steamship Corporation operated Meriden as a general cargo vessel between the Pacific Northwest states and California. As El Capitan the ship was engaged in the West Coast lumber trade on the same route. An example of the cargo was a load destined for San Pedro, California of 2,100,000 feet of lumber.

== U.S. Navy operation ==
El Capitan was delivered to the War Shipping Administration (WSA) on 14 March 1942 at Alameda, California to operate under an Army Transportation Corps agreement. The nature of the charter from E. K. Wood Lumber Co., of San Francisco, California was changed to bareboat on 23 April 1942 at Honolulu, Hawaii. The Navy acquired the vessel under a sub-bareboat charter at the same time. The ship was immediately commissioned as Majaba designated AG-43.

=== World War II service ===
Majaba completed conversion to a miscellaneous auxiliary 14 May 1942 and subsequently steamed to the Hawaiian Islands for cargo runs to islands of Polynesia and the South Pacific Ocean.

Departing Honolulu 24 June 1942, she operated during the next several months out of Honolulu and completed supply missions to Palmyra Island, Christmas Island, and Canton Island. In July Majaba was waiting at Palmyra for escort to the Southwest Pacific operations areas joining a convoy stopping at Fanning Island, Suva arriving at Auckland on 18 August 1942. Eventually she reached Efate, New Hebrides, to bolster the vital ocean supply line to American forces engaged in the bitter struggle for control of Guadalcanal.

Majaba departed the New Hebrides 26 October 1942 and steamed to meet two supply convoys bound for the Solomon Islands. However, heavy weather prevented the rendezvous, and she returned to Espiritu Santo 29 October. Later that day she sailed once again for Guadalcanal where she arrived 2 November 1942. Screened by USS Southard, she crossed Ironbottom Sound and unloaded cargo at Tulagi that same day.

==== Guadalcanal operations ====
Despite Japanese naval forces active in the area, Majaba shuttled cargo between Tulagi and Guadalcanal during the next few days. She arrived 2 nmi (2.3 mi; 3.7 km) east of Lunga Point, Guadalcanal, early 7 November 1942. (Note: Date Guadalcanal time, a day ahead of Washington, D.C. time with the enrty in Nimitz "Gray Book" for 6 November on page 1156.) While her escort, Woodworth, patrolled for enemy submarines off Lunga Point, she began final unloading operations prior to her planned departure for Espiritu Santo. Shortly before 0930 7 November 1942 lookouts in Lansdowne, anchored near Majaba, spotted a periscope of what postwar records indicate was HA-11 followed by two torpedo wakes. One torpedo, which apparently passed under Lansdowne, hit the beach but failed to explode. That torpedo came ashore about 50 ft (15.2 m) from a party of Seabees constructing a new pier and unloading lighters on the beach. The other curved toward Majaba and exploded against her starboard side amidships, destroying her engine room and boilers. All ammunition had been unloaded. She settled and listed slightly but did not sink. While Lansdowne and Woodworth searched for the enemy sub, Bobolink went to Majaba's aid. The tug towed the disabled ship east along the coast of Guadalcanal and beached her that afternoon off the month of the Tenaru River.

On 8 January 1943 (Note: The referenced on line DANFS has 1948. The print DANFS shows this obvious typo to be 1943.) USS Navajo and Bobolink freed Majaba from her beached position and towed her to Tulagi. Work had started on 1 January 1943 with salvage operations preparing the ship for towing and continued until the morning of 8 January when Navajo moored starboard side to port side of Majaba for the tow getting underway with assistance of Bobolink shortly after noon. At 1528 hours the ships arrived at Tulugi and beached the bow of Majaba in the mud of a river on Florida Island. (Note: Malaili River is mentioned in the referenced log but its location is unknown.) Additional salvage work, including unloading bombs, began 9 January and continued through 16 January 1943.

The November 1943 deck log of USS Denver anchored in Berth No. 10, Port Purvis Anchorage, Florida Island, Solomon Island Group, shows Majaba moored alongside at 1708 hours 18 November 1943, unloading ammunition, and departing to moor off USS SC 1268 at 1450 hours 20 November 1943. (Note: While no mention is made of towing vessels or Majaba requiring assistance the destruction of boilers and engine room by the torpedo a year earlier would indicate the ship was not self propelled at this time.)

Her engine was removed and her hull repaired and she was reclassified IX-102 and placed in an in-service status on 1 July 1943, she remained at Florida Island, Solomons, and during the remainder of World War II served as a floating quarters and material storage ship. The Office of Naval Intelligence list of vessels for 1945 notes the ship's function as "salvage and repair." As such the ship was assigned to Commander Service Force Pacific, Service Squadron Two. On 13 October 1945 ownership of the ship changed with the War Shipping Administration obtaining title requisitioned from E. K. Wood Lumber Company with ownership vested in the U.S. Maritime Commission. (Note: The DANFS mention of "charter" with rename and commissioning thereafter indicates a WSA bareboat chater arrangement fairly typical for commercial type ship hulls taken into both Navy and Army service but not purchased. Also typical was WSA acquisition of title after severe damage settling all claims and making any further repair or disposal decisions purely internal to government agencies.)

=== Post-war inactivation ===
Following the end of the war, Majaba was towed to the Philippines. She remained at San Pedro Bay, Leyte, until early in 1946 when she was towed to Subic Bay, Luzon. On 14 March 1946 the ship was placed out of service, redelivered to WSA and placed in the reserve fleet at Subic Bay. WSA declared the ship a loss on that date. Her name was struck from the Navy List 28 March 1946. The ship sank at her pier 14 July 1946 and, already declared a loss, was declared impossible to salvage. Majaba received one battle star for World War II service.

== Wreck ==
The remains of the ship are reportedly the most dived site in Subic Bay. The ship lies on its port side in about 20 m (65.6 ft) with the starboard side lying at 5 m (16.4 ft) to 8 m (26.2 ft) below the surface. The forward and aft cargo holds are open and the engine room and center hold can be reached by entering those. The wreck is sometimes used to train wreck divers.
