= SS Lawton B. Evans =

World War II Liberty ship of the United States

- A Liberty ship at sea

History

United States
- Name: Lawton B. Evans
- Namesake: Lawton B. Evans
- Operator: General Steamship Corporation
- Builder: Alabama Drydock and Shipbuilding Company, Mobile, Alabama
- Yard number: EMC #746 Hull# 287
- Laid down: 11 November 1942
- Launched: 3 January 1943
- Sponsored by: Betty Jane Hard
- Completed: 27 January 1943
- Fate: Scrapped in 1960

General characteristics
- Class & type: Type EC2-S-C1 Liberty ship
- Displacement: 14,245 long tons (14,474 t)
- Length: 441 ft 6 in (134.57 m) o/a; 417 ft 9 in (127.33 m) p/p; 427 ft (130 m) w/l
- Beam: 57 ft (17 m)
- Draft: 27 ft 9 in (8.46 m)
- Propulsion: Two oil-fired boilers; Triple-expansion steam engine; 2,500 hp (1,900 kW); Single screw
- Speed: 11 knots (20 km/h; 13 mph)
- Range: 20,000 nmi (37,000 km; 23,000 mi)
- Capacity: 10,856 t (10,685 long tons) deadweight (DWT)
- Crew: 81
- Armament: Stern-mounted 4 in (100 mm) deck gun; Variety of anti-aircraft guns

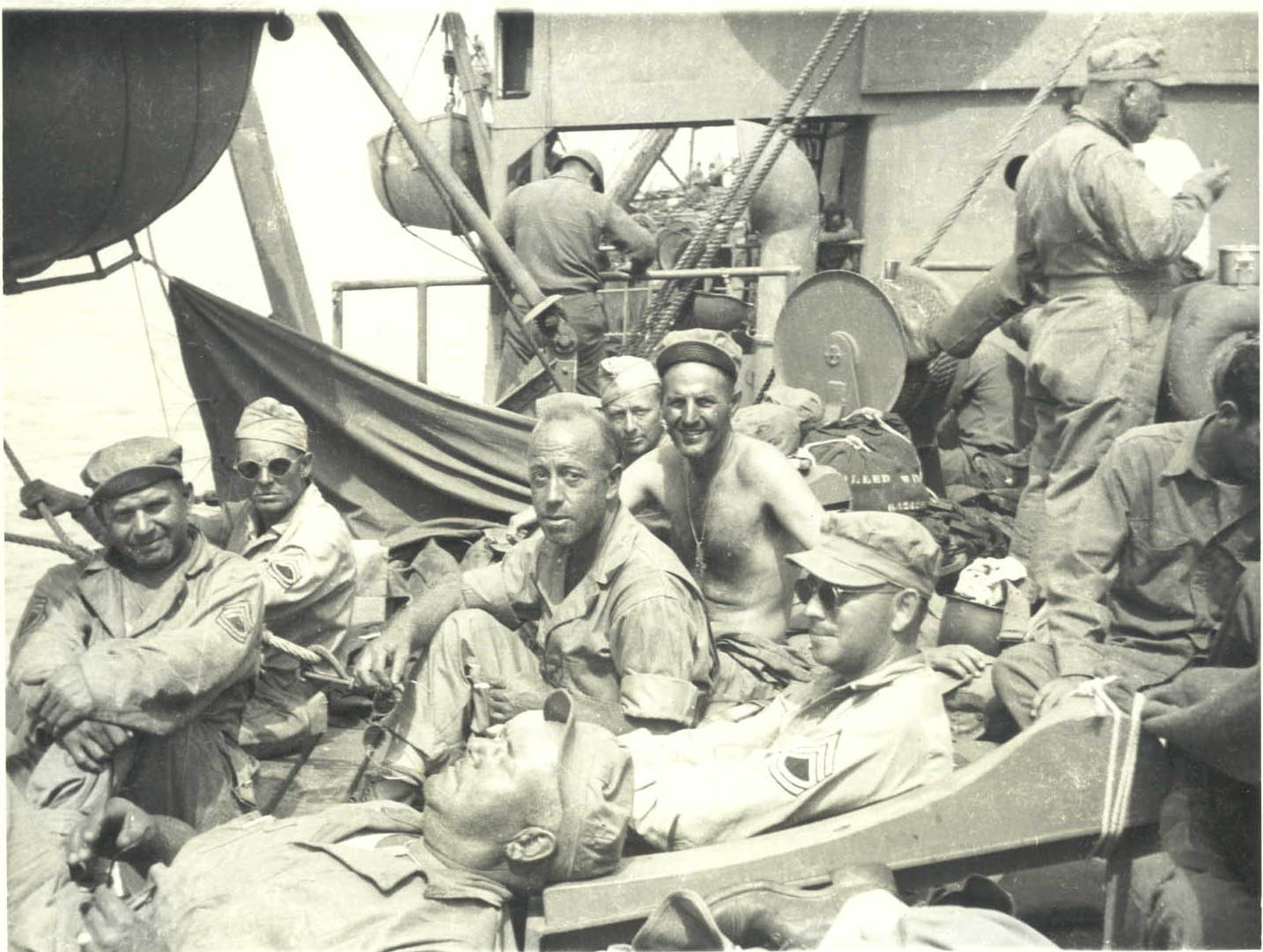
Army band aboard SS Lawton B. Evans in 1943

SS Lawton B. Evans was an American ship, constructed in Alabama during World War II it was named after the author Lawton Bryan Evans (1862–1934).

== Construction ==
SS Lawton B. Evans was a Liberty ship, with hull number 'MCE 746'. She launched at Alabama Drydock and Shipbuilding Company on 1 January 1943, sponsored by Betty Jane Hard, Winner of Scrap Metal Drive, Milledgeville, Georgia. The cosponsor was Mrs. E. D. Veal, Principal of Midway School, Milledgeville, Georgia.

== World War II ==
She was operated by the General Steamship Corporation under a charter with the Maritime Commission and War Shipping Administration.

=== U-boat encounter ===
During the Convoy HX 228 she was slightly damaged at 21.31 hours on 10 March 1943 when hit by a dud torpedo from German U-boat U-221 commanded by Hans-Hartwig Trojer. Out of the 22 ships hit by this German submarine SS Lawton B. Evans was the only one to survive.

=== Battle of Anzio ===
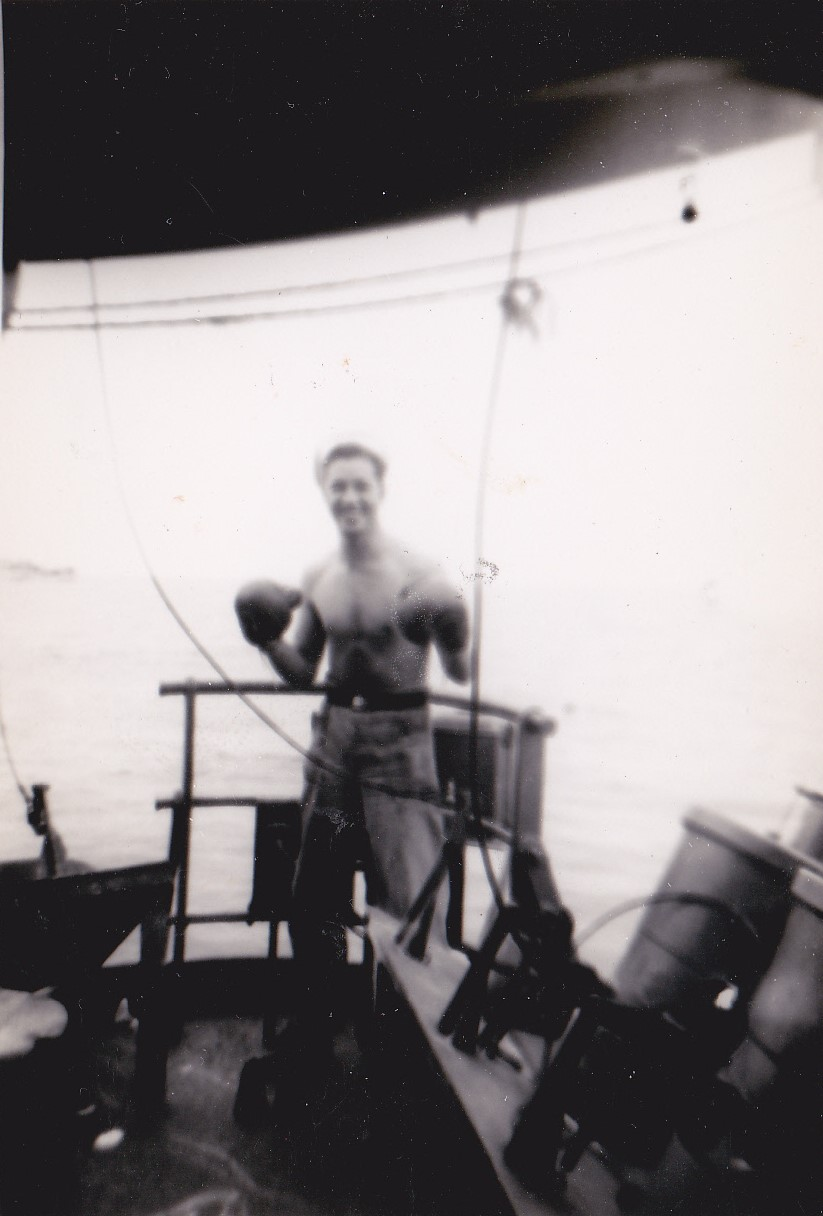
Amateur boxer Calvin "Jiggs" O'Rourke aboard SS Lawton B. Evans in 1943

Liberty ships were United States Shipping Board cargo ships, a merchant ship, fitted with guns for defensive purposes manned by United States Navy Armed Guard. In one notable incident they were used for support from 22 to 30 January 1944 when the Lawton B. Evans was involved in the Battle of Anzio in Italy. First class seaman Calvin Stoddard O'Rourke received commendations for his performance on 24 June 1944 when this ship was under repeated bombardment from hostile shore batteries and aircraft throughout an eight-day period. Despite the prolonged danger of shrapnel, machine-gun fire and bombs, the gun crew fought back, setting up a deadly barrage of shellfire. They shot down five German planes and contributed to the success of the landing operations.

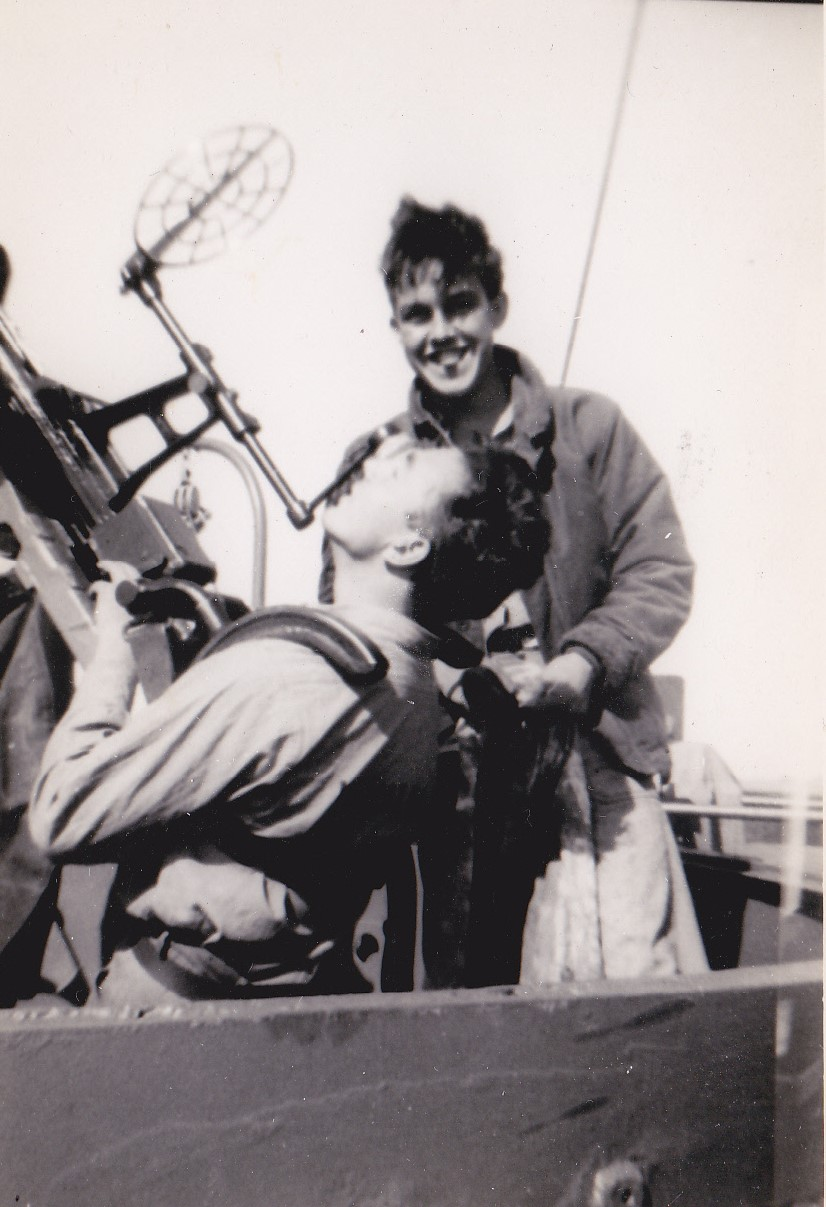
Gunner Calvin "Jiggs" O'Rourke aboard Lawton B. Evans in 1943

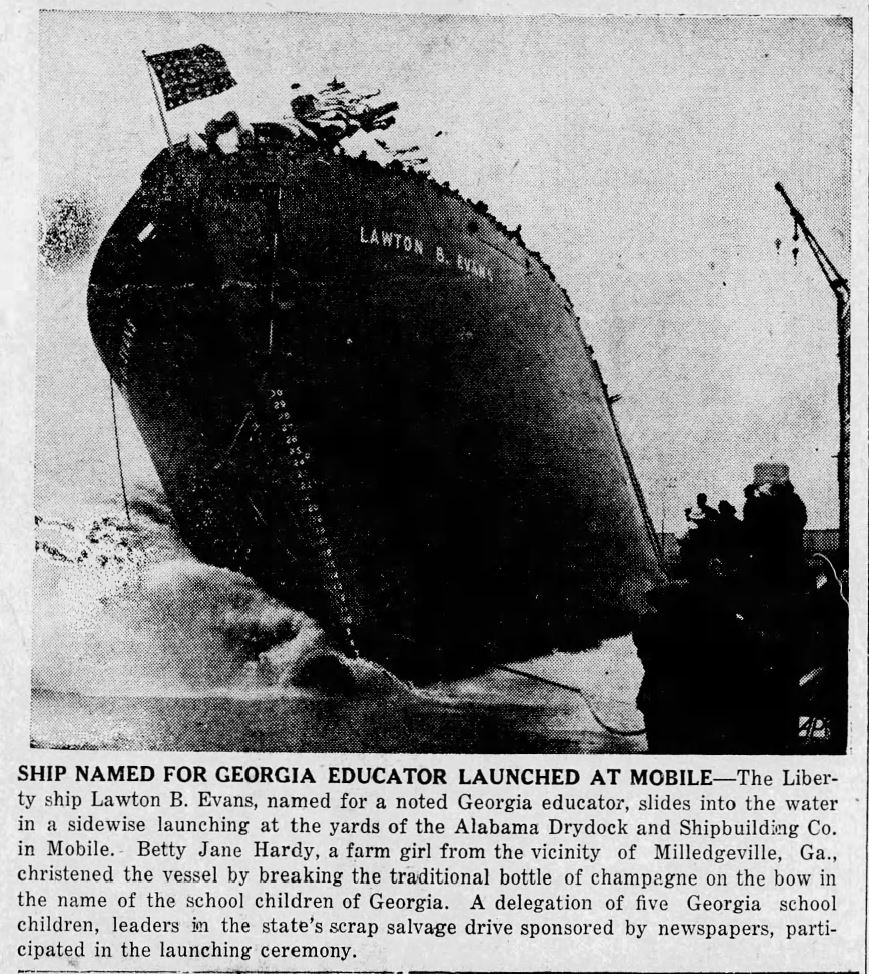
Launching of the S.S. Lawton B. Evans

== Scrapped ==
The ship was scrapped in Baltimore Harbor in Maryland in 1960.

== In popular culture ==
The 2021 motion picture, The Rebels of PT-218, featured a Merchant Marine vessel named the SS Lawton B. Evans under the command of Lieutenant William Snow, played by Eric Roberts about the Battle of Anzio and PT-218.
