= USS Procyon (AF-61) =

Cargo ship of the United States Navy

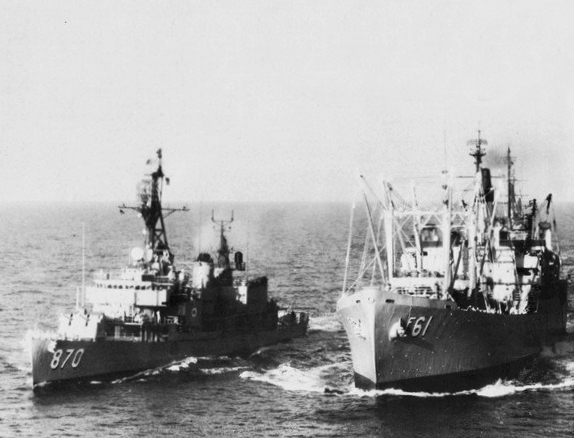
- Procyon replenishes USS Fechteler off Vietnam in 1969

History

United States
- Ordered: as SS Flying Scud, C2-S-B1 hull, MC hull 188
- Laid down: 15 April 1942
- Launched: 1 July 1942
- Completed: 18 August 1943
- Acquired: 8 August 1961
- Commissioned: 13 October 1961
- Decommissioned: 4 February 1972
- Stricken: 1 June 1976
- Fate: Scrapped 1986

General characteristics
- Displacement: 14,180 tons (fl)
- Length: 460 ft (140 m)
- Beam: 63 ft (19 m)
- Draught: 26 ft 7 in (8.10 m)
- Propulsion: cross-compound turbines, single propeller
- Speed: 16 kts.
- Complement: 292
- Armament: one 3 in (76 mm) gun mount

USS Procyon (AF-61) was an Alstede-class stores ship in service with the United States Navy from 1961 to 1972, following commercial service from 1943 to 1961. She was scrapped in 1986.

== A pre-commissioning history ==
Procyon was laid down 15 April 1942 as MC hull No. 188 by the Moore DD Co., Oakland, California; launched 1 July 1942 as SS Flying Scud; sponsored by Mrs. Carl W. Flesher; operated by the United Fruit Co. (18 August 1943 - 4 September 1946) under a General Agency Agreement with the Maritime Commission; acquired by the Pacific Far East Lines, Inc., under bare boat charter (5 September 1946 - 19 October 1948); transferred to the General Steamship Corp. 19 October 1948 under a General Agency Agreement; returned to MARAD 26 October 1948 and laid tip at Suisun Bay, California; re-chartered by Pacific Far East Lines 10 December 1948; placed in the Maritime Reserve Fleet at Suisun Bay 24 February 1956; acquired by the Navy 8 August 1961 and converted to Navy use at the San Francisco Naval Shipyard; renamed Procyon (AF–61), 13 October 1961; and commissioned 24 November 1961.

== Assigned to WestPac ==
After shakedown, Procyon engaged in the testing of Fast at Sea Transfer equipment (FAST) with other replenishment ships of the U.S. Pacific Fleet, before deploying to the Western Pacific Ocean 2 June 1962. She remained in and around Sasebo, Japan for three months, returning to the U.S. 26 September. She made her second WestPac deployment in support of U.S. 7th Fleet carrier task groups 23 February 1963, returning 7 July to conduct Fleet exercises and night replenishment operations until 6 October. Procyon was ordered back to WestPac in late October, returning 7 March 1964 for coastal operations. She was employed in the Gulf of Tonkin with the 7th Fleet (1 August–7 December) during the Vietnam crises.

== Vietnam operations ==
Procyon operated in support of the 7th Fleet off the coast of Vietnam, returning periodically to the U.S. for upkeep and training. She provided logistic support to Task Force 77 units on Yankee Station, as well as to Operation Market Time patrol craft along the coast and in harbor facilities from Da Nang to Vung Tau. The ship remained with the U.S. Pacific Fleet until 1970.

== Decommissioning ==
Procyon was decommissioned on 4 February 1972 and struck from the Naval Register, 1 June 1976. She was returned to MARAD in 1981 for lay up in the National Defense Reserve Fleet. MARAD eventually sold Procyon. She was scrapped in Taiwan in 1986.

== Military awards and honors ==
Procyon earned ten campaign stars for Vietnam War service:

- Vietnam Defense
- Vietnamese Counteroffensive
- Vietnamese Counteroffensive - Phase II
- Vietnamese Counteroffensive - Phase III
- Tet Counteroffensive
- Vietnamese Counteroffensive - Phase IV
- Vietnamese Counteroffensive - Phase VI
- Tet 69/ Counteroffensive
- Vietnam Winter-Spring 1970
- Sanctuary Counteroffensive

Procyon’s crew was eligible for the following medals:

- National Defense Service Medal
- Armed Forces Expeditionary Medal (Vietnam – 26 August-8 September 1964)
- Vietnam Service Medal (10)
- Republic of Vietnam Campaign Medal
