= USNS Mission Loreto =

Ship built in 1944

History

United States
- Laid down: 27 April 1944
- Launched: 28 June 1944
- Acquired: 20 November 1947
- In service: 20 November 1947
- Out of service: 13 July 1959
- Stricken: 13 July 1959
- Identification: IMO number: 6912190
- Fate: Scrapped September 1975

General characteristics
- Displacement: 21,880 tons full; 5,532 tons light
- Length: 524 ft (160 m)
- Beam: 68 ft (21 m)
- Draft: 30 ft (9 m)
- Propulsion: Turbo-electric, single screw, 6,000 hp (4.5 MW)
- Speed: 16.5 knots (31 km/h)
- Complement: 52 mariners

SS Mission Loreto was a Type T2-SE-A2 tanker built for the United States Maritime Commission during World War II. After the war she was acquired by the United States Navy as USS Mission Loreto (AO-116). Later the tanker transferred to the Military Sea Transportation Service as USNS Mission Loreto (T-AO-116). She was a Mission Buenaventura-class oiler and was named for Misión de Nuestra Señora de Loreto Conchó, located in Loreto, Baja California Sur, Mexico, considered the "Head and Mother of all the California Missions."

== Career ==
Mission Loreto was laid down on 27 April 1944 under a Maritime Commission contract by Marine Ship Corporation, Sausalito, California; launched 28 June 1944; sponsored by Mrs. S. D. Bechtel; and delivered 22 July 1944. Operated, under charter, by Los Angeles Tanker Operators Inc., she spent the remainder of the War transporting fuel to Allied forces in the western Pacific, during which time she was awarded the National Defense Service Medal. She continued in these duties until 26 April 1946 when she was returned to the Maritime Commission and laid up in the Maritime Reserve Fleet at Mobile, Alabama.

Acquired by the Navy on 20 November 1947, she was placed in service with Naval Transportation Service on the same date as Mission Loreto (AO-116). On 1 October 1949 she was still performing these duties, but was under control of the new Military Sea Transportation Service and was designated USNS Mission Loreto (T-AO-116). She continued in these duties until 25 August 1955 when she was struck from the Naval Vessel Register and transferred to the Maritime Administration for lay up in the Maritime Reserve Fleet at Beaumont, Texas.

Reacquired by the Navy 25 June 1956 she was placed in service with MSTS on the same date and served until 13 July 1959 when she was once again returned to the Maritime Administration and laid up in the Maritime Reserve Fleet at Suisun Bay, California.

The ship was scrapped in Portland, Oregon in September 1975.
