= USNS Twin Falls =

Ship

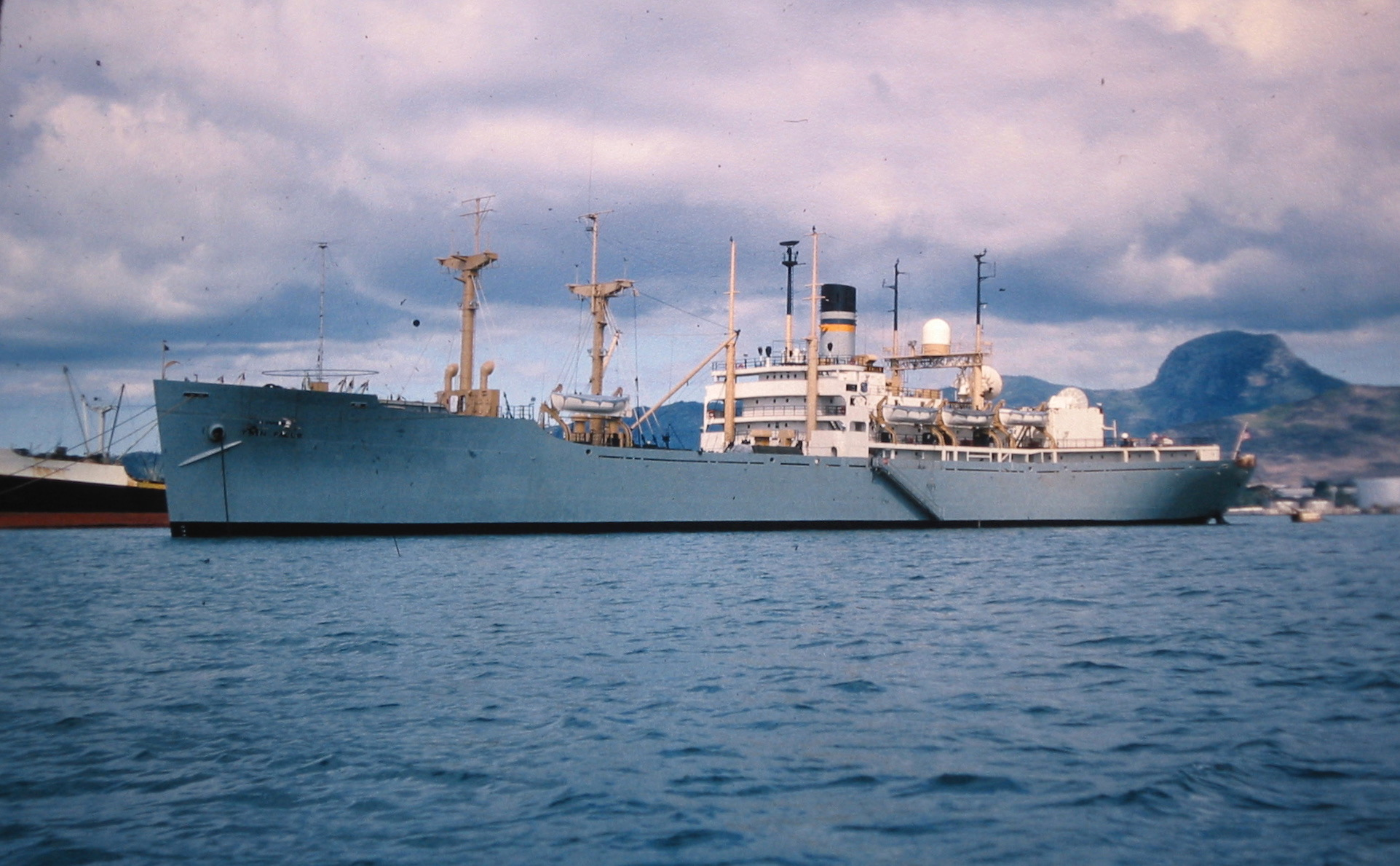
- USNS Twin Falls at anchor in Port Louis, Mauritius in December 1964

History

United States
- Name: Twin Falls Victory
- Namesake: Twin Falls, Idaho
- Owner: United States Maritime Commission
- Operator: Pope & Talbot Incorporated
- Ordered: As victory ship MCV Hull 167
- Builder: Oregon Shipbuilding Corporation
- Laid down: 27 December 1944
- Launched: 6 February 1945
- Identification: IMO number: 7732080
- Fate: Scrapped in 1983

General characteristics
- Class & type: Victory ship; type VC2-S-AP2, standard
- Tonnage: 10,750 DWT; 7,612 GRT
- Displacement: 15,200 long tons (15,444 t) (standard)
- Length: 455 feet 3 inches (139 m) oa; 436 feet 6 inches (133 m) pp; 444 feet (135 m) lwl
- Beam: 62 feet (19 m)
- Draft: 28 ft (8.5 m)
- Installed power: 2 × Oil fired boilers; 6,000 hp (4,500 kW)
- Propulsion: 2 × steam turbines; 1 × screw propeller
- Speed: 15 knots (28 km/h; 17 mph)
- Capacity: 523,740 cubic feet (14,831 m^{3}) (grain); 453,210 cubic feet (12,833 m^{3}) (bale)
- Complement: 38–62 USMM; 21–40 USNAG
- Armament: Varied by ship; Bow-mounted 3 inches (76 mm)/50 caliber gun; Stern-mounted 5 inches (127 mm)/50 caliber gun; 8 × single 20 millimeters (0.79 in) Oerlikon anti-aircraft (AA) cannons and/or,

SS Twin Falls Victory, named after Twin Falls, Idaho, was a Victory ship built for World War II. Converted to a Missile Range Instrumentation Ship, she was initially operated by the United States Air Force as USAF Twin Falls Victory, before coming under United States Navy control and being named USNS Twin Falls (T-AGM-11/T-AGS-37). She later had a third career as the training ship SS John W. Brown II.

== History ==
Twin Falls Victory was laid down under a United States Maritime Commission contract (MCV hull 167) on 27 December 1944 at Portland, Oregon, by the Oregon Shipbuilding Corporation; launched on 6 February 1945; sponsored by Mrs. J. B. Pfietor. The ship was delivered on completion 4 April 1945 to the War Shipping Administration (WSA) for operation by McCormick Steamship Company under a general agency agreement. On 24 June 1946 the Isthmian Steamship began operating the ship under a bareboat charter that continued under the United States Maritime Commission (MC), successor to WSA, until brief operation by General Steamship Corporation between 8 November and layup in the Suisun Bay Reserve Fleet on 18 November 1948. The ship was briefly activated, operated by various companies under agreements and bareboat charters, placed in reserve fleets at Mobile, Alabama and in the Hudson River. From 1950 to 1953, Twin Falls Victory was operated by States Marine Corporation. Between 1953 and 1958 American Export Lines operated the ship.

=== Korean War ===
During the Korean War she participated in the Inchon Landings and Hungnam Evacuation, making her merchant marine crew eligible for the Korean Service Medal and the United Nations Service Medal. On 25 February 1958 the ship was laid up with the National Defense Reserve Fleet at its berthing area on the James River in Virginia.

=== Missile range instrumentation ship ===
Twin Falls Victory, then in the James River reserve fleet, was permanently transferred from the MC to the United States Air Force on 24 March 1960. She was converted in Mobile, Alabama and instrumented to be a missile range instrumentation ship supporting the U.S. Army's Pershing Missile Project and served as part of the Eastern Test Range. The ship was modified by equipping it with special navigation systems, AN/FPS-16 monopulse missile tracking radar, telemetry receiving equipment, AN/SPN-8 splash detection radar, AN/GMD-1A Rawinsonde tracking equipment and a balloon hangar, to house a Kytoon tethered blimp and as a weather balloon inflation shelter. The ship eventually was delivered to the Atlantic Missile Range and operated by merchant marine crewmen and contractor technical staff. Pan American World Airways and its subcontractor RCA MTP operated the radar, telemetry, navigation and weather instrumentation aboard the ship. The ship was operated under the name USAF Twin Falls Victory until turned over to MSTS on 1 July 1964 at which time the ship was redesignated T-AGM-11 Twin Falls and continued to serve as a mobile tracking platform for recording data on missiles and satellites that were out of range of land-based tracking stations.

On 15 May 1963, she was positioned approximately 350 miles (560 km) ESE of Savannah, Georgia (near 31°03′N 75°00′W) as part of Project Mercury, to track Gordon Cooper's extended MA-9 mission.

In August 1964 the USNS Twin Falls sailed from Port Canaveral, FL. After a short stop at Ascension Island the Twin Falls sailed to Cape Town, South Africa, en route to the Indian Ocean to track a scheduled missile launch Plans were in place to resupply in Perth, Australia, but due to missile launch schedule changes, she sailed to Port Louis, Mauritius instead. After leaving Mauritius, the Twin Falls sailed to Port Elizabeth, South Africa, arriving there in Dec 1964. In early Jan 1965 the ship was again anchored at Ascension Island. Her next port-of-call was Trinidad and the next 6 months were spent in the Caribbean Sea area with Trinidad as her home port.

In October 1969, the Air Force determined that Twin Falls was no longer necessary to its mission. Placed in custody of the Maritime Administration (MARAD) on 22 May 1970, she was slated for disposal. On 26 April 1971, the Navy recalled her for "possible use as a survey ship". Presumably this was when she was redesignated T-AGS-37. On 2 November 1972 the ship was transferred on loan to the New York City and she was struck from the Naval Vessel Register on 6 November 1972.

=== Training ship ===
On 30 November 1972 the ship was transferred to the New York City Board of Education. Renamed SS John W. Brown II, she served as a training facility for that city's Food and Maritime Trade High School. She was returned to MARAD on 8 June 1982.

== Fate ==
Twin Falls was withdrawn from MARAD on 30 June 1982 by Union Minerals & Alloys Corporation. She was scrapped in 1983. Her builders plate is on loan from MARAD to Twin Falls County, Idaho, and is on display in the Twin Falls County Courthouse.

== See also ==
- Missile Range Instrumentation Ship
- List of ships of the United States Air Force
