= SS Middlebury Victory =

Victory ship of the United States

- Typical Victory ship

History

United States
- Name: Middlebury Victory
- Namesake: Middlebury College in Middlebury, Vermont
- Owner: War Shipping Administration
- Operator: General SS Company
- Builder: Permanente Metals, plant No. 2
- Laid down: December 16, 1944
- Launched: February 3, 1945
- Completed: March 1, 1945
- Fate: Sank 27 January 1947 in the Mediterranean Sea

General characteristics
- Class & type: VC2-S-AP3 Victory ship
- Tonnage: 7,612 GRT, 4,553 NRT
- Displacement: 15,200 tons
- Length: 455 ft (139 m)
- Beam: 62 ft (19 m)
- Draught: 28 ft (8.5 m)
- Installed power: 8,500 shp (6,300 kW)
- Propulsion: HP & LP turbines geared to a single 20.5-foot (6.2 m) propeller
- Speed: 16.5 knots (30.6 km/h; 19.0 mph)
- Boats & landing craft carried: 4 lifeboats
- Complement: 62 Merchant Marine and 28 US Naval Armed Guards
- Armament: 1 × 5-inch (127 mm)/38 caliber gun; 1 × 3-inch (76 mm)/50 caliber gun; 8 × 20 mm Oerlikon

SS Middlebury Victory was an American Victory-class cargo ship built during World War II. Middlebury Victory (MCV-726), was a type VC2-S-AP2 victory ship built by Permanente Metals Corporation, Yard 2, of Richmond, California. The Maritime Administration cargo ship was the 726th ship built. Her keel was laid on December 16, 1944. The ship was christened on March 1, 1945. Middlebury Victory was an armed cargo ship named for Middlebury College in Vermont, one of 150 educational institutions that had Victory ships named after them. She was built at the Oregon Shipbuilding yards in just 75 days, under the Emergency Shipbuilding program for World War II. The 10,600-ton ship was constructed for the Maritime Commission. She was operated by the General SS Company under the United States Merchant Marine Act for the War Shipping Administration.

Victory ships were designed to replace the earlier Liberty ships. Liberty ships were designed to be used just for World War II, while Victory ships were designed to last longer and serve the United States Navy after the war. The Victory ship differed from a Liberty ship in that they were faster, longer and wider, taller, and had a thinner stack set farther toward the superstructure and a long raised forecastle.

Middlebury Victory served in the Atlantic Ocean, taking supplies to troops still in Europe after VE Day, May 8, 1945. She was operated by the General SS Company as a charter with the Maritime Commission and War Shipping Administration.

== Sinking ==
After the war Middlebury Victory took supplies to the US troops stationed in Europe and returned with goods for the United States. The Middlebury Victory ran aground on Planier Island on the January 27, 1947, when en route from Haifa, Israel to New York City with a cargo of cotton, copper, and tobacco. Planier Island (Île du Planier in French) is 13 kilometres (8.1 mi) from Marseille, Bouches-du-Rhône, France in the Mediterranean Sea, at (42°43′N 4°30′E). Middlebury Victory was steaming at top speed at night in stormy seas when she went aground at midnight. In addition to her cargo, the Middlebury Victory had passengers board, 11 candidates for the seminary at the request of the Greek Orthodox Archdiocese of New York. The students boarded at Piraeus, Greece on January 9, 1947 to travel to the United States. One of the Middlebury Victory lifeboats capsized in the heavy surf and the crew had to swim about 150 yards to reach shore. A Danish freighter also helped some of those that abandoned ship. The French navy rescued some of the students and the crew of 22, taking them to the French shore after hearing the distress call from the Middlebury Victory. The students resumed their trip a week later, arriving in Baltimore on March 3, 1947.

The ship was badly damaged and abandoned as a constructive total loss.

== See also ==
- List of Victory ships
- Type C1 ship
- Type C2 ship
- Type C3 ship

== Sources ==
- Sawyer, L.A. and W.H. Mitchell. Victory ships and tankers: The history of the ‘Victory’ type cargo ships and of the tankers built in the United States of America during World War II, Cornell Maritime Press, 1974, 0-87033-182-5.
- United States Maritime Commission:
- Victory Cargo Ships
