= USS Cohocton =

Oiler of the United States Navy

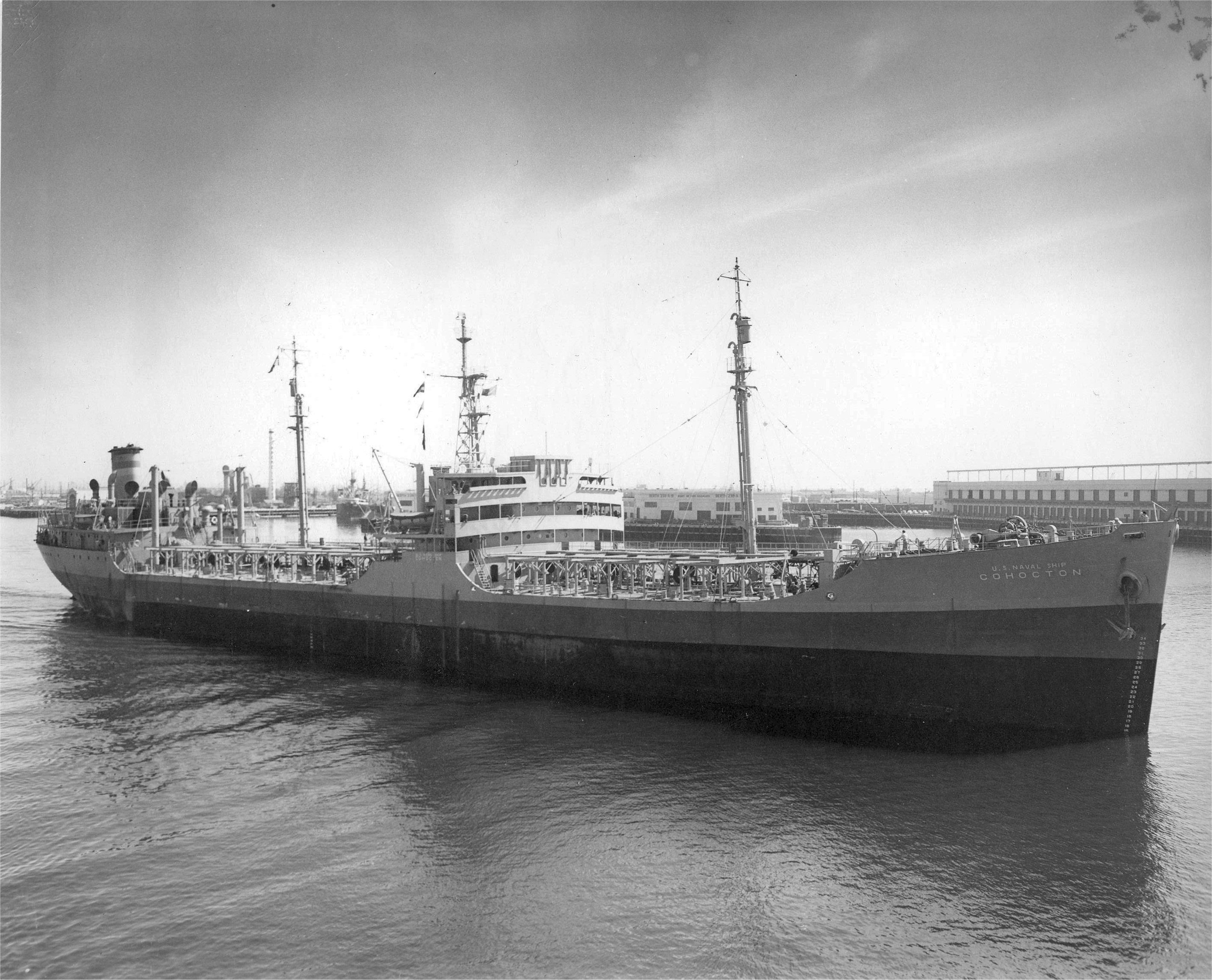
- USNS Cohocton (T-AO-101)

History

United States
- Name: USS Cohocton
- Namesake: Cohocton River
- Builder: Marinship, Sausalito, California
- Launched: 28 June 1945
- Commissioned: 25 August 1945
- Decommissioned: 14 June 1946
- Acquired: 1 October 1949
- In service: as USNS Cohocton (T-AO-101)
- Out of service: (date unknown)
- Stricken: (date unknown)
- Identification: IMO number: 6807034
- Fate: Sold into commercial service, 16 September 1969; Sold for scrapping, 29 July 1980

General characteristics
- Type: T2-SE-A3 tanker
- Displacement: 5,782 long tons (5,875 t) light; 21,880 long tons (22,231 t) full
- Length: 523 ft 6 in (159.56 m)
- Beam: 68 ft (21 m)
- Draft: 30 ft 10 in (9.40 m)
- Propulsion: Turbo-electric, single screw, 8,000 shp (5,966 kW)
- Speed: 15 knots (28 km/h; 17 mph)
- Capacity: 140,000 barrels (22,000 m^{3})
- Complement: 267
- Armament: 1 × 5"/38 caliber dual purpose gun; 4 × 3"/50 caliber guns; 4 × twin 40 mm guns; 4 × twin 20 mm guns

USS Cohocton (AO-101) was lead ship of her class of fleet oiler acquired by the United States Navy for use during World War II. She had the dangerous but necessary task of providing fuel to vessels in combat and non-combat areas. She served in the Pacific Ocean Theatre of operations late in the war.

Cohocton was launched 28 June 1945 by Marinship Corp., Sausalito, California, under a Maritime Commission contract; sponsored by Mrs C. O. Day; commissioned 25 August 1945 and reported to the Pacific Fleet.

== End-of-war Pacific Theatre operations ==
Cohocton sailed from San Francisco, California, on 5 September 1945 for Eniwetok, carrying ammunition and fresh water. She supported occupation forces in the Far East and western Pacific by carrying water from one port to another and serving as station water tanker. She called at Guam, Ulithi, Samar, Leyte, Yokosuka, Wakayama, and Kagoshima before arriving at Qingdao, China, on 10 January 1946, for station duty until 21 April. She returned by way of San Pedro, California, and the Panama Canal to Mobile, Alabama, where she was decommissioned on 14 June 1946 and returned to the War Shipping Administration the same day.

== Reassigned to MSTS ==
Cohocton was reacquired by the Navy and operated by a civilian company under contract to the Navy Transportation Service.

She was reassigned to Military Sea Transportation Service on 1 October 1949; reinstated in the Naval Register and placed in-service as USNS Cohocton (T-AO-101). Placed out-of-service, (date unknown); struck from the Naval Register, (date unknown); transferred to MARAD for lay up in the National Defense Reserve Fleet, (date unknown).

Cohocton was withdrawn from the reserve fleet on 27 September 1967 and transferred to the Hudson Waterways Corporation as part of the MARAD Exchange Program, and renamed SS Transoneida, IMO 6807034. The ship was converted to container ship in 1969. Upon completion of the conversion she was sold to the C.T.I. Corporation on 16 September 1969 and began hauling containerized cargo for Seatrain Lines between U.S. west coast ports and Hawaii, Guam and other U.S. Pacific territories. In 1974 Transoneida was leased to Matson, Inc. when Seatrain sold its Hawaiian operations to the Hawaiian-based shipping company. She was sold for scrapping to the Keun Hwa Iron & Steel Work Enterprise, Ltd., Taiwan, on 29 July 1980.
