= Motorpool (disambiguation) =

A motorpool is a group of motor vehicles shared for short-term use in an organization.

Motorpool or motor pool may also refer to:

- Motorpool.com, a social media web site for classic car enthusiasts created by Morgan Murphy
- Motor pool (neuroscience), the group of motor neurons that innervate a muscle
- Motorpool, a code-name for Operation Popeye, a highly classified weather modification program in Southeast Asia during 1967–1972
