= Timeline of strikes in 1983 =

In 1983, a number of labour strikes, labour disputes, and other industrial actions occurred.

A labour strike is a work stoppage caused by the mass refusal of employees to work. It is usually a response to employee grievances, such as low pay or poor working conditions. Strikes can also occur to demonstrate solidarity with workers in other workplaces or pressure governments to change policies.

== Timeline ==
=== Continuing strikes from 1982 ===
- 1982-83 Caterpillar strike, 206-day strike by Caterpillar Inc. workers in the United States, represented by the United Auto Workers, one of the longest strikes in UAW history.
- 1982-84 French auto strikes fr strikes led by immigrant workers in the automobile industry in France against low salaries and discrimination.
- 1977-83 Madison Newspapers strike

=== January ===
- 1983 Independent Truckers Association strike, 11-day strike by Independent Truckers Association truckers in the United States.
- 1983 Québec teachers' strike, including solidarity strikes by other public sectors workers.

=== February ===
- Strikes by followers of the anti-immigration Assam Movement in India following the 1983 Assam Legislative Assembly election.
- 1983-84 Sagunto strikes, series of strikes and protests in Sagunto, Spain, over the closure of the Altos Hornos del Mediterráneo steel plant in the city.
- 1983 Whirlpool Corporation strike, 109-day strike by Whirlpool Corporation in the United States.

=== March ===
- One-day general strike in Argentina called by the General Confederation of Labour against the government of Reynaldo Bignone.
- 1983 French internists' strike, by internists in France over lack of jobs.
- 1983 Israel doctors' strike, 4-month strike by doctors in Israel over wages.
- 1983 SEPTA Regional Rail strike
- Wide Comb dispute, by sheep shearers in Australia, represented by the Australian Workers' Union, over new regulations on shearing equipment.

=== April ===
- 1983 Aqueduct Racetrack strike, 25-day strike by Aqueduct Racetrack maintenance workers in the United States.
- 1983 Kingsbrook Jewish Medical Center strike, 8-day strike by at the Kingsbrook Jewish Medical Center in the United States.

=== May ===
- Jornadas de Protesta Nacional, including slowdown strikes, against the Military dictatorship of Chile.

=== June ===
- 1983 Arizona copper mine strike, 3-year strike by Phelps Dodge copper miners, represented by the United Steelworkers.
- 1983 Financial Times strike, 10-week strike by the Financial Times pressroom over wages and staffing levels.
- 1983 Wilson Foods strike, 3-week strike by Wilson Foods workers in the United States.

=== July ===
- 1983 New York City Opera strike, 54-day strike by New York City Opera musicians.
- 1983 Pacific Coast Metal Trades Union strike

=== August ===
- 1983 AT&T strike
- 1983 Briggs & Stratton strike, 13-week strike by Briggs & Stratton workers in the United States.
- 1983-85 Continental Airlines strikes, series of strikes by Continental Airlines workers, including a 25-month pilots' strike.
- La grève de la fierté, strike by garment workers in Montréal, Canada; the first strike by International Ladies Garment Workers Union members in Montréal in 43 years.

=== September ===
- 1983 Belgian public sector strike, by public sector workers in Belgium against austerity measures proposed by Wilfried Martens' government.

=== October ===
- 1983 Vauxhall strike, by Vauxhall Motors workers in the United Kingdom.

=== November ===
- 1983 Greyhound Bus Lines strike in Seattle
- NGA Dispute, strike by National Graphical Association members in the United Kingdom.

=== December ===
- 1983 Suriname bauxite strike, by bauxite miners in Suriname against tax increases designed to qualify the country for an International Monetary Fund loan.
- Tunisian bread riots

== Commentary ==
The Australian government calculated that an average of 249 working days were lost to work stoppages per 1000 workers in 1983, the lowest number since 1967.
