= William H. Todd =

American shipbuilder (1864–1932)

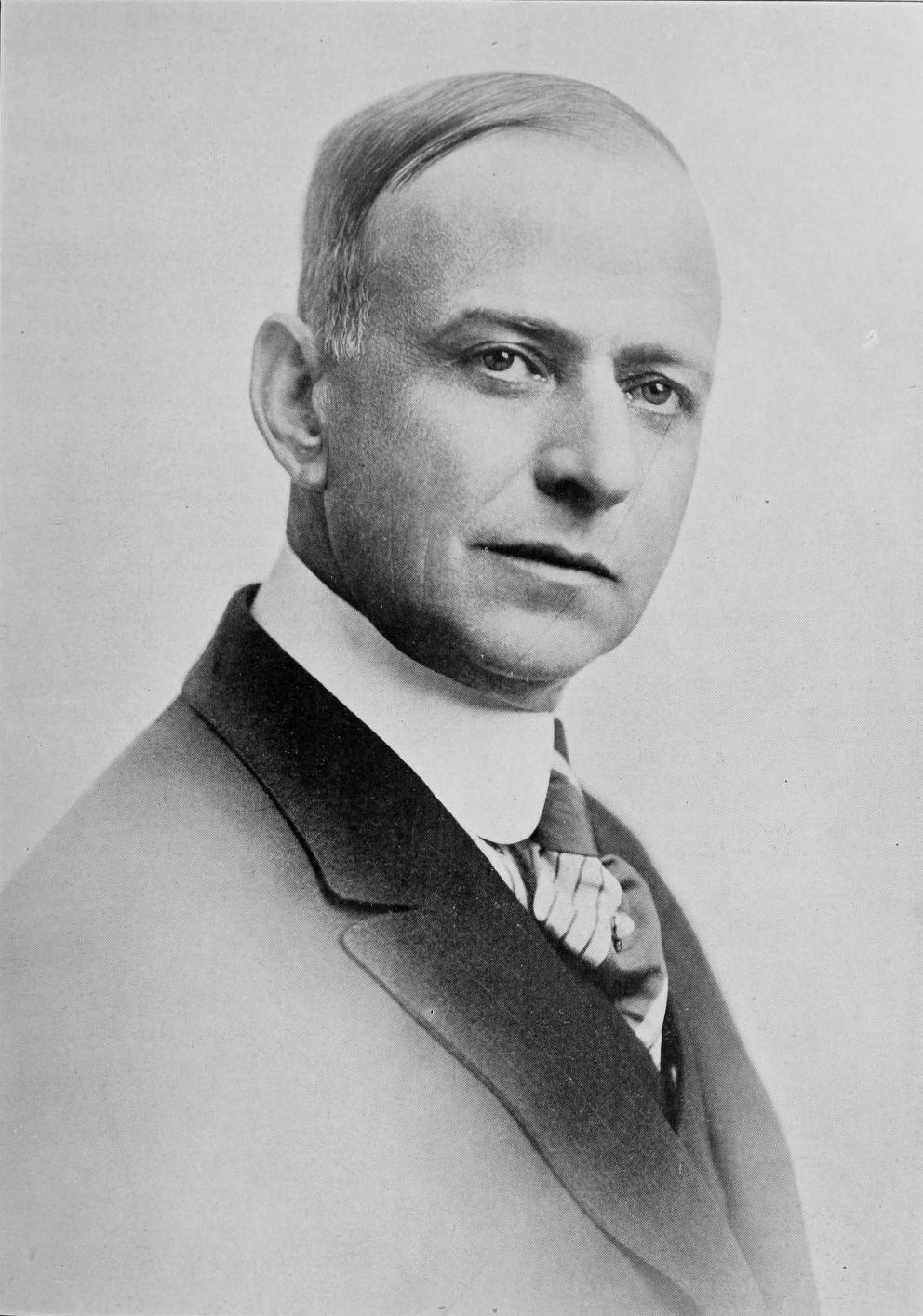
- William H. Todd
- Born: November 27, 1864
- Died: May 15, 1932 (aged 67)
- Occupation: Shipbuilder

William H. Todd (1864–1932) was an American shipbuilder and philanthropist.

He was born on November 27, 1864, the son of a boilermaker in Wilmington, Delaware. He apprenticed to be a shipwright at the Pusey and Jones Shipyard in Wilmington as a young man and moved to Brooklyn, New York in 1893 to work in the Brooklyn Navy Yard. He left the Navy Yard in 1896, to become foreman of the Robins Dry Dock & Repair Company of Erie Basin. He eventually became president of Robins, and in 1916 merged that company with others to form the Todd Shipyards.

He died May 15, 1932.

== Legacy ==
- Todd Square, a park in at the intersection of Columbia Street and Halleck Street in Brooklyn, New York
- Todd Shipyards, now Vigor Shipyards
- Todd Shipyards (soccer) team he supported.
- Liberty ship SS William H. Todd
