= List of strikes in Israel =

Throughout the history of Israel, a number of strikes, labour disputes, student strikes, hunger strikes, and other industrial actions have occurred.

== Background ==
A labour strike is a work stoppage caused by the mass refusal of employees to work. This can include wildcat strikes, which are done without union authorisation, and slowdown strikes, where workers reduce their productivity while still carrying out minimal working duties. It is usually a response to employee grievances, such as low pay or poor working conditions. Strikes can also occur to demonstrate solidarity with workers in other workplaces or pressure governments to change policies.

== 20th century ==
=== 1970s ===
- 1972 Bar-Ilan University strike, strike by students at Bar-Ilan University.

=== 1980s ===
- 1980 Soviet immigrants' protests in Israel, including strikes by Soviet immigrants to Israel over lack of jobs and housing, triggered by the suicide of chemical engineer and Soviet immigrant Arkodi Seiderman.
- 1981 El Al strike, 12-day strike by El Al staff in Israel.
- 1982 Arab citizens of Israel general strike, general strike by Arab citizens of Israel following the Sabra and Shatila massacre.
- 1982 Israel public sector strike, over cost-of-living.
- 1983 Israel doctors' strike, 4-month strike by doctors in Israel over wages.
- 1984 Israeli broadcast strike, 2-week strike by Israel Broadcasting Authority TV and radio workers in Israel.
- 1985 strike of Ethiopian Jews in Israel, strike by Ethiopian Jews in Israel protesting against the Chief Rabbinate of Israel's policy that they had to undergo conversion to be recognised as Jews.
- 1986 Israeli nurses' strikes, including an 18-day strike by nurses in Israel.
- 1987 Israeli broadcasting strike, 52-day strike by Israeli public radio and television.
- 1987 Arab citizens of Israel general strikes, two one-day general strikes by Arab citizens of Israel protesting discrimination and for an end to repression of Palestinians.

=== 1990s ===
- 1990 Arab citizens of Israel general strike, general strike by Arab citizens of Israel over lack of government funding for Arab municipalities.

== 21st century ==
=== 2000s ===
- October 2000 protests in Israel

=== 2010s ===
- 2017 Teva strike, by Teva Pharmaceuticals workers in Israel.
- 2018 Israeli LGBT strike

=== 2020s ===
- 2023 Israeli judicial reform protests
- September 2024 Israel hostage deal protests, part of the 2024 Israeli protests.
