= USS Kajeruna =

Patrol vessel of the United States Navy

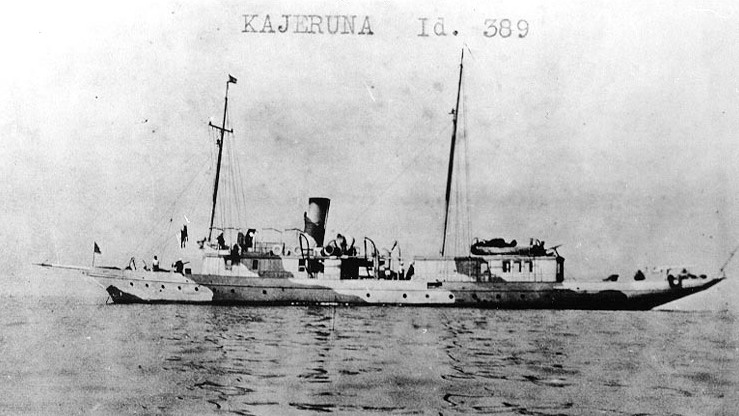
- USS Kajeruna (SP-389) painted in camouflage during World War I.

History

United States
- Name: USS Kajeruna
- Namesake: Previous name retained
- Builder: John N. Robins & Son, Erie Basin, New York
- Launched: 31 May 1902
- Completed: 1902
- Acquired: May 1917
- Commissioned: May 1917
- Fate: Returned to owner 16 January 1919
- Notes: Operated as private steam yacht Hauoli, Seminole, and Kajeruna 1902/1903-1917 and Kajeruna from 1919

General characteristics
- Type: armed yacht
- Tonnage: 147 GRT
- Length: 153 ft (47 m)
- Beam: 14 ft 6 in (4.42 m)
- Draft: 7 ft 9 in (2.36 m) aft
- Installed power: 850 indicated horsepower
- Propulsion: Steam engine, one shaft
- Speed: 14 knots (26 km/h)
- Armament: 2 × 6-pounder guns; 1 × machine gun

USS Kajeruna (SP-389) was a patrol vessel that served in the United States Navy from 1917 to 1919. The vessel had been built in 1902 as Hauoli for mining magnate Francis Marion "Borax" Smith but was replaced in 1903 by a second, larger vessel he named Hauoli. The first yacht was then named Seminole and for a time was returned to the builder, John N. Robins, and advertised for sale by the designer's firm. In 1911 Clinton W. Kinsella of New York purchased the yacht, apparently already renamed Kajeruna. After naval service the yacht was returned to the owner. On 31 March 1920 the ship was sold to British interests and renamed Tomas W. Beattie.

== Francis Marion Smith's two Hauoli yachts ==
There were two yachts named Hauoli designed by Henry J. Gielow and built a year apart by Robins Dry Dock & Repair Company, Brooklyn, New York, for Smith. This leads to apparent discrepancies in specifications in contemporary reports regarding Hauoli. The registration's official number and code letters remain with the vessel through name and ownership changes. In this case even the official numbers are very close, differing in only a single digit: 96634 for the first and 96694 for the second.

=== Hauoli 1902 (ON 96634) ===
The first yacht, found by Smith to be too small, was almost immediately replaced with a new larger yacht launched the summer after the first yacht. This first Hauoli was later renamed Seminole, then Kajeruna. Ownership of this yacht after delivery of the new yacht was for a time with the builder, John N. Robins, with the designing firm offering it for sale during 1911 and 1912.

=== Hauoli 1903 (ON 96694) ===
The second Hauoli, registered with US official number 96694 and code letters KSNM, was also designed by Henry J. Gielow and built for Smith by the Robins Dry Dock & Repair Company in 1903. This yacht is shown with registered specifications of 299 GRT with a 211 ft (64.3 m) length overall, 22 ft 2 in (6.8 m) beam and 8 ft 8 in (2.6 m) draft and having four Almy boilers providing steam for a four-cylinder, triple expansion engine built by J. W. Sullivan of New York was taken in for Navy service in 1917 as USS California (SP-249).

== First Yacht Haouli ==
The steam yacht Hauoli was built in 1902 by Robins Dry Dock & Repair Company, Brooklyn, New York, for mining magnate Francis Marion "Borax" Smith. The yacht was launched 31 May 1902 at John N. Robbins' shipyard, Erie Basin, Brooklyn, New York with Miss Lulu Pfizer christening the vessel Hauoli as the Hawaiian word for "delight" in the presence of Mr. Smith's business manager and several hundred friends. On registration Hauoli was assigned the official number 96634 with code letters KRTJ with home port being New York.

Hauoli was designed by Henry J. Gielow and built under his direct supervision. The hull was divided into four water tight compartments and was double bottomed with those bottom spaces capable of either fresh water storage or water ballasting. That yacht is described as being 147 GRT with a 147 ft 4 in (44.9 m) length overall, 14 ft 6 in (4.4 m) beam and 6 ft 8 in (2.0 m) draft. It had two twenty-two foot deck houses placed fore and aft of the machinery space that had funnel and ventilators visible between the houses and an open bridge above the forward deck house. It is described as having two boilers.

Two twenty-two foot in length deck houses were placed fore and aft of the machinery space that was topped by a single stack and ventilators. A dining saloon with a table seating for up to fourteen people occupied the forward portion of the forward deck house. The open navigating bridge was atop the deck house. A butler's pantry was fitted in the after portion and connected to the galley on the deck below by a dumb waiter. The aft deck house had a piano, large sofas on each side with a folding berth on the partition between the main space and a forward portion devoted to a dressing room and lavatory with toilet. That space could be entered from either the lounge or the deck.

About a quarter of the way between the aft deck house and stern was the companionway giving access to the staterooms occupied by the owner and his wife that lay forward immediately aft the machinery space bulkhead. That steel bulkhead was double with asbestos insulation in the form of interior bulkheads with air space between to reduce noise to the owner's spaces. Between those and the companionway, going aft, lay a large stateroom and bath on the starboard side. Opposite those were two portside staterooms. Aft of the staterooms was the main saloon with direct access to the afterdeck by the companionway. Water storage tanks flanked the companionway.

Forward of the owner's quarters and the aft deckhouse was the machinery space with the other habitable parts of the vessel forward of that space. Just forward was the galley occupying the full width of the yacht. A refrigerator and cold storage occupied the port side of the galley while with the food preparation area and dumb waiter were starboard and the large stove placed amidships at the aft bulkhead. Forward of the galley were staterooms flanking a short passageway for the yacht's captain on the starboard side and the engineer to the port side. Forward of those was berthing for a crew of ten with three bunk tiers to starboard and two to port. A toilet occupied space forward on the port side. Forward of the toilet and bunks was a two-person stateroom for the stewards.

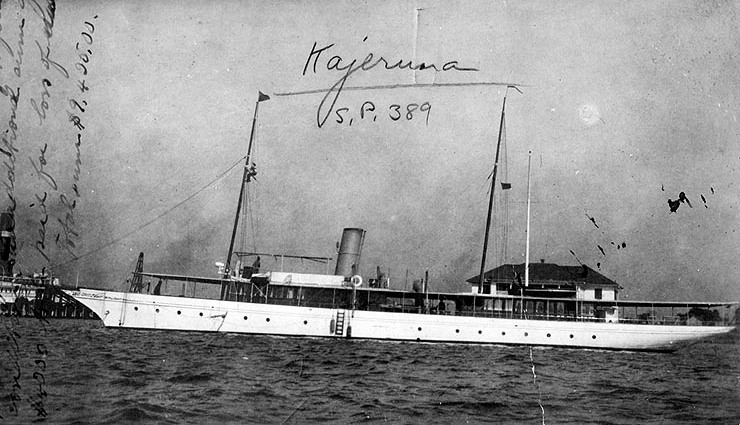
Kajeruna as a private yacht before World War I.

=== Ownership by builder and sale ===
Lloyd's Register of American Yachts for 1905 — 6 shows the first Haouli as renamed Seminole and being owned by John N. Robins, the builder. In an October 1911 advertisement by the designing firm, Gielow & Orr, the yacht is for sale as Hauoli. Seminole is shown in registers as owned by Robins until the 30 June 1910 Annual List of Merchant Vessels of the United States when the vessel is shown as Kajeruna. By June 1911 the register shows Kajeruna with Clinton W. Kinsella of New York as owner. Some confusion about owner's names may be caused by news reports of F. E. Kinsella, possibly related, with a racing motorboat at the same time with the name Kajeruna. By December 1916 the yacht had been purchased by Alfred W. Gieske of Baltimore and the yacht was then associated with the Baltimore Yacht Club.

== US Navy service ==
In May 1917, the US Navy acquired Kajeruna from her owner, A.W. Gieske of Baltimore, Maryland, under free lease for use as a patrol vessel during World War I. She was commissioned that month as USS Kajeruna (SP-389).

Assigned to the 5th Naval District and based at Norfolk, Virginia, Kajeruna served as flagship of Patrol Squadron 3. The vessel was one of eight assigned mine sweeping duties in the 5th District, routinely sweeping the designated channels for ship entry and egress. She operated in Hampton Roads and the Chesapeake Bay for the remainder of World War I.

== Post war ==
Kajeruna left active service soon after the war ended on 11 November 1918 and was returned her to her owner on 16 January 1919. The report for the fiscal year ended June 30, 1920 by the Commissioner of Navigation shows the vessel sold to British interests on 31 March 1920. Later records show the ship was renamed Tomas W. Beattie classed as general cargo with an IMO number of 5364176. (Note: Based on searches the name is associated with a Cuban figure and the vessel may have had Cuban associations.)
