= USS California (SP-249) =

Patrol vessel of the United States Navy

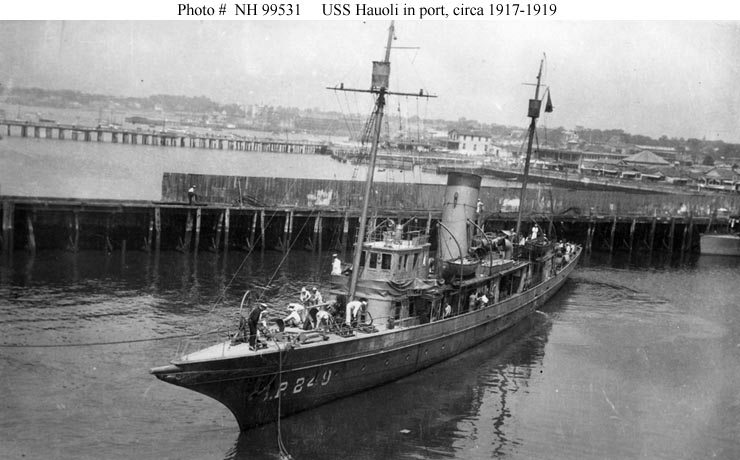
- USS Hauoli (SP-249) In port, circa 1918-1919. This patrol vessel served as USS California (SP-249) from December 1917 until February 1918, when she was renamed Hauoli

History

United States
- Name: Hauoli; California; USS California (24 December 1917); USS Hauoli (18 February 1918); California
- Namesake: Hauoli is a Hawaiian word meaning "delight."; State of California
- Owner: Francis Marion Smith; Clara B. Stocker; U.S. Navy; Denton Shore Lumber Co.
- Builder: Robins Dry Dock and Repair Company, Brooklyn, New York
- Launched: Summer 1903
- Completed: 1903
- Acquired: (Navy) 18 August 1917
- Commissioned: (Navy) 24 December 1917
- Decommissioned: (Navy) 8 October 1919
- Renamed: (Navy) USS Hauoli (SP-249) on 18 February 1918
- Stricken: (Navy) 16 September 1919
- Identification: ON 96694, signal KSNM
- Fate: Sold on 7 September 1920; fate unknown

General characteristics
- Type: Yacht
- Tonnage: 299 GRT
- Displacement: 285 (Navy, 1918)
- Length: 211 ft (64.3 m) LOA; 166 ft (50.6 m) waterline
- Beam: 22 ft 2 in (6.8 m)
- Draft: 8 ft 8 in (2.6 m)
- Installed power: steam, 4 Almy water tube boilers
- Propulsion: 4 cyl., triple expansion steam engine
- Speed: 19 knots (22 mph; 35 km/h)
- Endurance: 750 nautical miles (860 mi; 1,390 km)
- Complement: As original yacht: 14; Navy: 60
- Armament: 2 6-pounder guns, 2 machine guns

USS California (SP-249) was a yacht acquired by the United States Navy during World War I and outfitted as an armed section patrol vessel patrolling New York waterways. Later, renamed the original name of Hauoli, it was assigned to Thomas A. Edison conducting underwater listening experiments related to antisubmarine warfare.

The yacht was a second Hauoli built in 1903, replacing one of the same name built in 1902, for mining magnate Francis Marion "Borax" Smith. This second Hauoli was notable for speed, described as perhaps the fastest single screw yacht of its class in the world. In 1912 the yacht was sold to Clara Baldwin Stocker, an heiress residing in Los Angeles, who renamed the yacht California. She had to await the opening of the Panama Canal to bring the yacht to her residence. It was noted as the first pleasure vessel to transit the canal. The yacht was home ported in Los Angeles. At some point, either prior to or upon the Navy's acquisition, the yacht was brought back to New York. After naval service, the yacht was sold to a company in Tampa, Florida.

== Francis Marion Smith's two Hauoli yachts ==
There were two yachts named Hauoli designed by Henry J. Gielow and built a year apart by Robins Dry Dock & Repair Company, Brooklyn, New York, for F. M. Smith. This leads to apparent discrepancies in specifications in contemporary reports regarding Hauoli. The registration's official number and call signal remains with the vessel through name and ownership changes. In this case even the official numbers are very close, differing in only a single digit: 96634 for the first and 96694 for the second.

=== Hauoli 1902 (ON 96634) ===
The first Hauoli was assigned the, official number 96634 with call letters KRTJ. That first yacht was launched 30 May 1902 at John N. Robbins' shipyard, Erie Basin, Brooklyn, New York with Miss Lulu Pfizer christening the vessel. That yacht is described as being 147 GRT with a 147 ft 4 in (44.9 m) length overall, 14 ft 6 in (4.4 m) beam and 6 ft 8 in (2.0 m) draft. It had two twenty-two foot deck houses placed fore and aft of the machinery space that had funnel and ventilators visible between the houses and an open bridge above the forward deck house. It is described as having two boilers. This vessel is shown in Lloyd's Register of American Yachts for 1905 – 6 as being owned by John N. Robins, the builder, and renamed Seminole. This yacht became USS Kajeruna (SP-389).

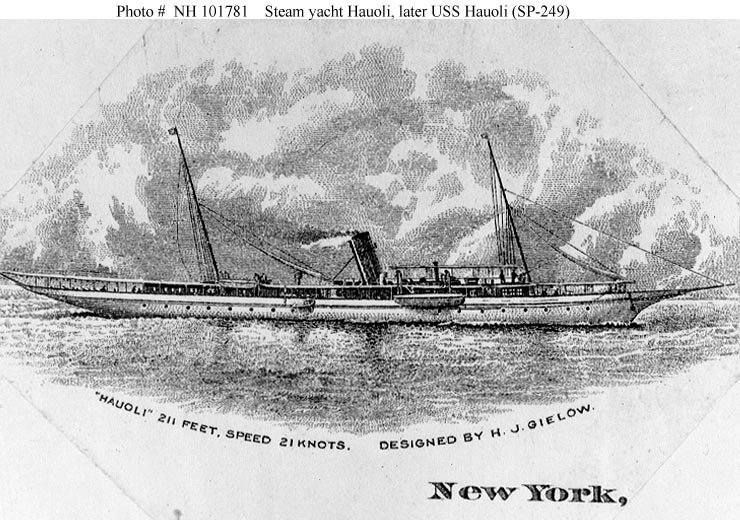
Hauoli (U.S. Steam Yacht, 1903) engraving, probably depicting it as originally built. Later named California, it was acquired by the United States Navy and commissioned as USS California (SP-249).

=== Hauoli 1903 (ON 96694) ===
The second Hauoli, registered with official number 96694 and signal letters KSNM, was also designed by Henry J. Gielow and built for Smith by the Robins Dry Dock & Repair Company in 1903. It is this yacht that became California and then the naval vessel.

== Yacht Hauoli (1903) ==
Smith found the first Hauoli too small so had a larger one built with many of the same features. The second Hauoli was launched in the summer of 1903 and in use during that year's sailing season and was being prepared for the 1904 steam yacht racing season. Features of some big yachts at the time were changing from the oceanic cruising with more comfort and speed than even the British cruising yachts of the time. They were being built for business men wanting home like comfort along with high speed both to travel from homes as far away as Newport, Rhode Island to the city and to participate in the popular racing events. Designers of this new type concentrated on hull and engine features promoting speed and comfort, with use generally expected to be Long Island Sound or coastal cruising, at the sacrifice of cruising range and oceanic seaworthiness.

=== Description ===
Haouli was a single funnel, two masted, schooner rigged yacht with registered specifications of 299 GRT, 203 net tons, with a 211 ft (64.3 m) length overall, 166 ft (50.6 m) waterline length, 22 ft 2 in (6.8 m) beam and 8 ft 8 in (2.6 m) draft. The registered length of 176 ft 5 in (53.8 m) is comparable with the Navy's 179 ft 6 in (54.7 m) in contemporary data as precise measuring methods differ. The Navy gave a displacement tonnage of 285 tons in 1918 data. The least freeboard was 5 ft 6 in (1.7 m) with a flush deck. The hull had four watertight bulkheads and double bottom suitable for ballast or fresh water storage.

The main deck had two deck houses. The forward deck house was 58 ft 6 in (17.8 m) in length lying between the foremast and machinery space indicated by the stack and ventilators. The after deck house was 42 ft 6 in (13.0 m) with the mast running through the space. The 20 ft (6.1 m) space between them, over the machinery space, was bridged by a promenade deck running from the steering station at the forward extreme to the rear of the aft deck house. A stairway inside the aft end of the forward house led to the deck above and the bridge.

The first 22 ft (6.7 m) of the forward house contained a dining saloon with a 3 ft (0.9 m) by 14 ft (4.3 m) dining table. At the rear was the pantry that connected the dining area from the galley that was fully equipped. The galley took up the starboard side with a room for the captain and stair to the officer's quarters below occupying the port side. The dining room, pantry and captain's room were finished in mahogany paneling with a mahogany ceiling in the dining room. The remaining space, with the stack passing through, was a "drying room."

The forward part of the aft house contained a 14 ft 6 in (4.4 m) by 6 ft 6 in (2.0 m) dressing room with lavatory and toilet with access either from the deck or from the 13 ft (4.0 m) by 18 ft (5.5 m) deck stateroom lying between the dressing room and social room. The social room was 22 ft 6 in (6.9 m) with a piano, desk, seating and a stairway to the passageway on the deck below. That lower deck contained seven large staterooms, three toilets, two with bath. The forward two staterooms were each 13 ft (4.0 m) by 10 ft (3.0 m) with a connecting bathroom and lay against the aft machinery space bulkhead which was steel with asbestos bulkheads and air spaces between that ant the wooden bulkhead for the living spaces.

Forward of the machinery space and bulkhead was the full galley with a dumbwaiter connecting it to the smaller galley above. Forward of the galley, on the starboard side, was a room for five Japanese servants. On the port side was the stairway to the deck above, storeroom and engineers stateroom. Next forward was the officers mess room with a stateroom for the assistant engineer and mate and officer's bathroom to starboard. Two staterooms, one for cook, steward and waiter and the other for petty officers lay between the officer's mess and the forecastle where there were hammock berths for twelve men in a space 13 ft 6 in (4.1 m) long. Hot and cold running water was provided in all living areas and baths had both fresh and salt water taps.

Four Almy water tube boilers provided steam for a four-cylinder, triple expansion engine built by J. W. Sullivan of New York with a high pressure cylinder of 17 in (43.18 cm), a medium of 26.5 in (67.31 cm) and two low pressure cylinders of 30 in (76.20 cm) with a 21 in (53.34 cm) stroke. During a four-hour trial Hauoli averaged 18 knots (21 mph; 33 km/h) and under forced draft made better than 21 knots (24 mph; 39 km/h). The Navy rated the vessel's top speed at 19 knots (22 mph; 35 km/h), cruising speed at 15 knots (17 mph; 28 km/h) with a 750 nautical miles (860 mi; 1,390 km) cruising endurance. Though losing narrowly in the Lysistrata Cup race on 18 June 1904 to a twin screw yacht, Hauoli was considered fast and was perhaps the fastest single screw yacht of her class in the world. Electric lighting and ventilation was installed and among the vessels small boats was a 20 ft (6.1 m) electric launch. The other boats were a 20 ft (6.1 m) gig, a 16 ft (4.9 m) cutter and 15 ft (4.6 m) dinghy.

=== Use ===
The yacht was used by Smith, a member of the New York Yacht Club, largely for cruising Long Island Sound and local waters from his summer home at Shelter Island, New York. The estate was originally on Clark Cove but after Smith acquired more land, built a seawall and put in a landing dock and a loading dock for coaling for his yachts, Hauoli and Effort II, it became known as Smith Cove.

During the spring of 1904, Hauoli was preparing to challenge the steam yacht Kanawah for the Lysistrata Cup, already won the previous year by that yacht and, if won in the forthcoming race, would become a permanent award. Kanawah was being prepared by modifications to boilers and engine room with Hauoli, under the supervision of her designer, undergoing alterations. On 18 June the race took place off Sandy Hook under the auspices of the New York Yacht Club with USS Truxtun (DD-14) serving as the judges' vessel and the tug Walter Lukenbach serving as the turning point. On board Hauoli was her designer, Henry Gielow, personally supervising the engine room. Kanawah won with a slightly better speed and time and retained the cup permanently. The results were an average speed of 19.90 knots (22.90 mph; 36.85 km/h) for the twin screw Kanawah, burning twenty tons of picked coal, and 19.53 knots (22.47 mph; 36.17 km/h) for the single screw Hauoli, burning fifteen tons of coal.

== Yacht California ==
In 1912 the yacht was sold to Mrs. Clara Baldwin Stocker, daughter of Elias Jackson "Lucky" Baldwin, and went into the yard for a refit that included fitting of a turtle deck forward. The yacht was renamed California with a new home port at Mrs. Stocker's home in Los Angeles. Mrs. Stocker was a colorful heiress determined to "spend a million or two to have a really good time" with an estimated $24,000,000 to spend. Among other acquisitions was a private railway car, named "California," and "I believe I just about bought Tiffiany out" in diamonds. She stated she could not quite remember from whom she bought Hauoli but she was going to rename the yacht California because the state was "delight enough for me" though she was going to have to wait until the Panama Canal was opened to bring the yacht from the Atlantic. The yacht left the fitting out yard on 28 July 1914 for New York, then from there on 1 August for California by the Panama Canal. On 1 October 1914 California arrived at Los Angeles after being the first pleasure vessel to transit the canal.

== World War I service ==
California was purchased by the Navy for $65,000 in August 1917 from her owner, Clara Baldwin Stocker, of Los Angeles. (Note: DANFS for California III (S. P. 249) simply notes it third vessel with the name and refers to entry for Hauoli. The Hauoli entry states Mrs. Stocker was "of New York" but she was definitely a resident of Los Angeles, though she may have had property in New York City.) After fitting out the vessel commissioned as USS California at New York Navy Yard 24 December 1917, Lt. (j.g.) W. Applebye-Robinson, USNRF, commanding. The name was changed back to the original Hauoli 18 February 1918.

California was fitted with two six pounder guns and two machine guns and had a crew of sixty total, including five officers. Navy inspection found a maximum speed of 19 knots (22 mph; 35 km/h), cruising speed of 15 knots (17 mph; 28 km/h) with a cruising endurance of 750 nautical miles (860 mi; 1,390 km).

Hauoli spent the first year of its service as a patrol vessel in New York Harbor. It patrolled outside the harbor also, and occasionally carried passengers to and from convoys.

== Assigned to Thomas A. Edison ==
The yacht was transferred to special duty 28 January 1919, and assigned to the experimental use of Thomas A. Edison for ASW (antisubmarine warfare) studies. Edison installed listening devices in Hauoli and carried out tests in and around New York harbor.

== Post-war decommissioning ==
Before demobilization cut short the experiments with Hauoli, it was withdrawn from that service and decommissioned 8 October 1919, and later sold to Denton Shore Lumber Co., Tampa, Florida, 7 September 1920. (Note: Web searches show the company as doing some shipbuilding, repair and scrapping. It suffered loss of several vessels in the 1921 hurricane.)
