= Red Hook Grain Terminal =

Abandoned grain elevator in New York City

Coordinates: 40°40′10″N 74°0′22″W

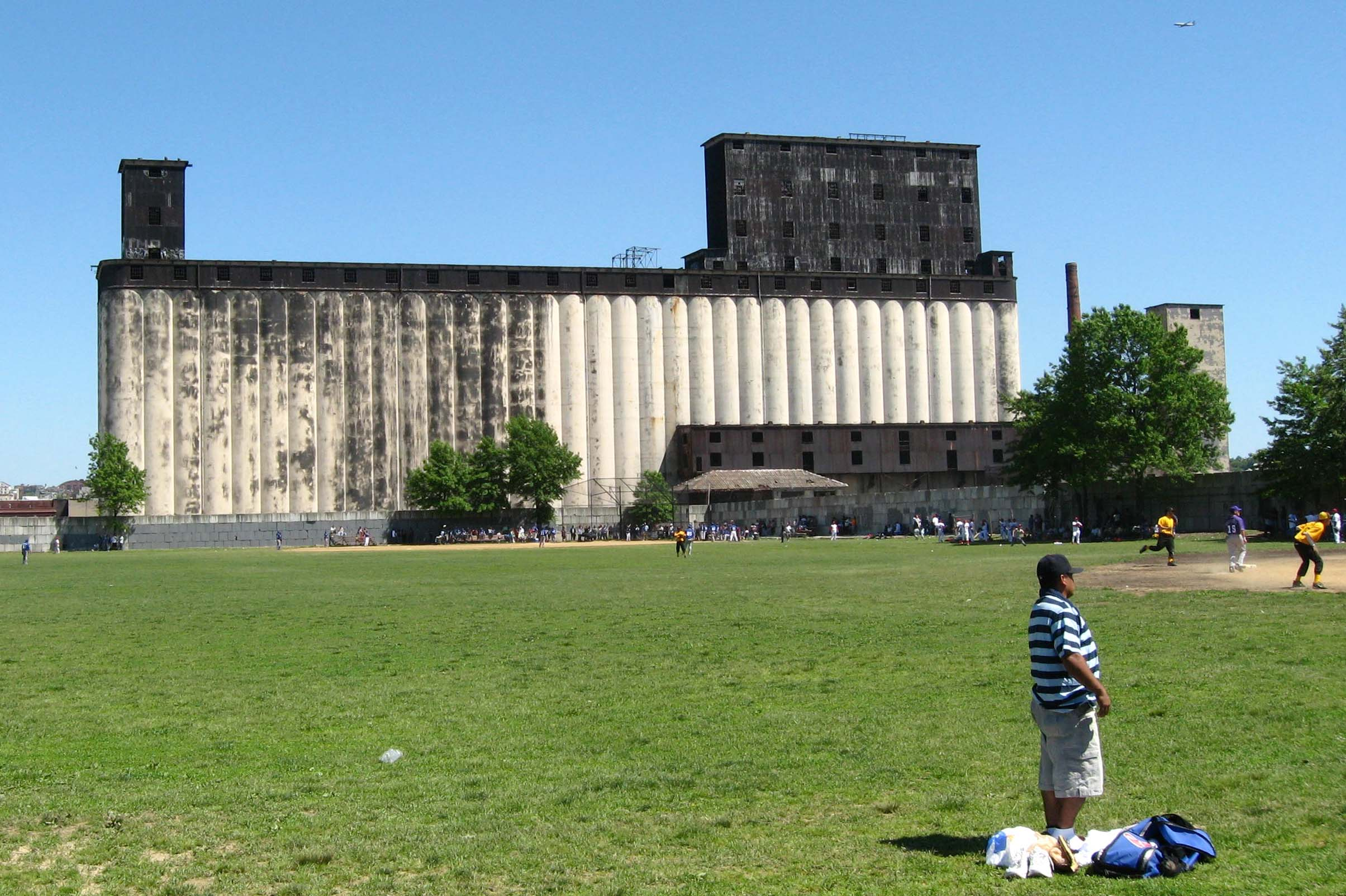
A view of the grain terminal from the Red Hook Recreation Center at Columbia St

The Red Hook Grain Terminal is an abandoned grain elevator in the Red Hook neighborhood of Brooklyn, New York City, situated between the mouth of the Gowanus Canal and Erie Basin. It is 12 stories tall, 70 feet (21 m) wide, and 429 feet (131 m) long, containing sixty 120-foot-tall (37 m) cement silos. As the neighborhood's tallest structure, it is highly visible from the elevated Gowanus Expressway and New York City Subway's IND Culver Line viaducts over the Gowanus Canal.

Built in 1922, it was immediately redundant upon its completion, failed to generate profit and transferred hands to the Port Authority of New York and New Jersey in 1944, which decommissioned it in 1965 after continued financial difficulty. There are current plans by its current owner, Gowanus Industrial Park, Inc., to redevelop the site. A recycling plant, a concrete storage facility, and a movie studio have all been discussed, although no plans have made significant headway and the building remains abandoned. Located directly south of the structure is the Loujaine, a Panamanian registered bulk carrier that currently being used as a floating storage hulk.

== History ==
=== Construction ===
The terminal was built in 1922 to serve the New York State Canal System. At the turn of the century, a new idea came into play to build a new system of canals as a replacement of the old, narrow Erie Canal. The plan gained wide support, and 524 miles of canals connected several bodies of water in the area, including Lake Erie, Lake Champlain and the Hudson River.

The investment in new canals was largely a failure, as the usage of canals declined over the next quarter-century. By 1918, the canal system was being utilized at 10 percent of its capacity. It carried only 1 million bushels of grain in 1918, in comparison to 30 million bushels of grain in 1880.

One reason for this dramatic drop was that the two grain elevators in New York City were owned by railroads, which denied storage privileges to barge operators. The barges then had to wait, fully loaded, until the vessel destined to receive their grain arrived, instead of having a grain terminal store the grain in this time. In 1920, Scientific American magazine supported the idea of a huge grain elevator in New York City largely to preserve the state's investment in the barge canal on which $150 million has been spent and others agreed.

A site was chosen at the foot of Columbia Street, adjacent to the Erie Basin, at the mouth of the Gowanus Canal. The Office of the State Engineer designed a 54-bin reinforced concrete grain elevator that took 16 months to build. The structure itself was designed to be as sturdy as a bomb shelter, the elevators built to hold the combustible grain were made explosion-proof. The pouring of concrete for the 90-foot-high silos was completed in 13 days. Freighters moored at an adjacent pier, where a 1,221-foot-long conveyor delivered the grain directly on board. The terminal cost $2.5 million.

=== Operation and disuse ===
Shortly after its construction, it became clear that the grain terminal would not be as successful as it was intended to be. On the terminal's opening day, September 1, 1922, Governor Nathan L. Miller remarked, "Even if the barge canal were never used in normal times, it is a good thing to have it in case of emergencies." The canal did little more than this.

By 1925, Engineering News-Record magazine called the entire barge canal an "expensive luxury". Thomas Flagg, an industrial archaeologist who surveyed this and other waterfront sites for the Army Corps of Engineers in 1984, said the barge canal and the grain terminal never made back their investment; "Both are magnificent works of engineering, but also magnificent boondoggles." The lack of success led control of the terminal to be transferred from the state to the Port Authority of New York and New Jersey in 1944.

Although in its early years under the Port Authority, the terminal was increasingly successful, it began to decline in the late 1950s, especially after the opening of the St. Lawrence Seaway in 1959 further reduced grain shipments from the Great Lakes to the Port of New York. Labor costs became uncompetitive relative to those of other ports like those of Philadelphia and New Orleans where by 1964, loading grain cost $0.21/ton and $0.15/ton, respectively. By comparison, the same task in New York cost $0.78/ton. The consequences were apparent throughout: in that year New York handled 1.7 million bushels of grain, Philadelphia 26.5 million bushels, and New Orleans 238 million bushels. In 1965, the grain terminal was deactivated. In 1987, the loading pier and conveyor structure were demolished.

== Recent usage and future projects ==
In 1990, the Port Authority announced its plans to sell or lease 159 acres in the area, including the 43.4-acre site of the Grain Terminal. The New York City Department of Sanitation and Staten Island Resources (a consortium of the Bechtel Group, the Solar International Trading Corporation and National Ecology Inc.) proposed using the site for a recycling center and, perhaps, using the former silos for storage or even composting, however a deal never went through.

In 1997, John Quadrozzi Sr., president of Quadrozzi Concrete, purchased the site of the grain terminal and some surrounding 46 acres, incorporating it into the Gowanus Industrial Park. Quadrozzi had expressed interest in restoring it to commercial use, specifically concrete production and road salt storage. In the summer of 2002, Zacho Dance Theater presented an aerial performance where dancers scaled the building and 100-foot (30 m) video images of Red Hook were projected on the terminal walls.

After his death in 2004, his son John Jr. inherited the company, intending to convert the Grain Terminal building as part of a redevelopment plan for the site, the Gowanus Bay Terminal. A recycling plant, a concrete storage facility and a movie studio have all been discussed, although no plans have made significant headway and the building remains abandoned.

In 2007, Quadrozzi Jr. stated that his company was seeking government approval for a concrete manufacturing plant that would use the silos for bulk cement storage. Quadrozzi also said that the silos, which can hold 70,000 tons of cement, remain solid. The plan, which was reported in The Brooklyn Paper, required approval from the state’s Department of Environmental Conservation. Approval has not yet been granted and there is no set timetable for the silos to reopen.

=== Music videos ===
The terminal was used for the filming of two music videos: the Young Replicant directed video for "Team" by Lorde and the Markus Klinko directed video for the David Bowie song "Valentine's Day".

=== Maritime attractions ===
On July 2, 2013, the early-20th-century ferryboat Yankee was tugged from Hoboken to the Henry Street Pier of the Gowanus Bay Terminal, directly to the south of the Grain Terminal building. Quadrozzi expects it to eventually be docked along the Columbia Street Pier, a more visible location where it would serve as a "public attraction vessel" where "the public can become educated".

In October 2015, Quadrozzi expressed interest in mooring the aging luxury passenger liner SS United States, the largest built entirely in the country and fastest of its kind to cross the Atlantic Ocean, at the Gowanus Bay Terminal in an effort to preserve the largely stripped vessel and prevent its scrapping. Currently docked at Pier 82 along the Delaware River in South Philadelphia, its relocation proposal was warmly received by Brooklyn Community Board 6, one member of which stated that it would "create a huge space of commercial and industrial use in Red Hook which is really in line with what the neighborhood uses are now". Quadrozzi intended on converting the vessel into an office and entertainment complex, but had trouble finding financial backers after they had become less receptive to investing upon learning that "the boat was on the brink". That following February, Crystal Cruises signed a purchase option from the SS United States Conservancy with intent to restore and reuse it for passenger service once refurbished

== Environmental concerns ==
=== Illegal dumping ===
In May 2006, a pile of fill of unknown origin and composition was disposed of on a broken pier within Gowanus Bay Terminal's property and was promptly washed away into the bay by the high tide. Concluding that this potential contamination may have "[clouded] the waterways and [interfered] with the habitats of living things that depend on those waters", the New York State Department of Environmental Conservation (NYS DEC) fined Gowanus Industrial Park $60,000 the following May and ordered it to remove illegally constructed fencing erected around its property, the latter of which was executed in 2009. As of April 2013, Quadrozzi has reportedly settled for the original $60,000 amount with the NYS DEC.

=== Landfill expansion proposal ===
In November 2012, Quadrozzi proposed landfilling a portion of Gowanus Bay to expand the terminal to accommodate larger vessels and create more land to rent to industrial tenants. The material used from this $506 million EPA-supervised cleanup of the Gowanus Canal Superfund site, to be paid for by firms the agency would find responsible for the canal's pollution, would be the "lowest-level contaminants", which would then be mixed with a "'concrete-like…stabilizing material that could safely be deposited in open water as landfill". Both developments would provide as many as 200 jobs to local residents, according to Quadrozzi's spokesperson. In 2013, complaints from Red Hook residents including concerns regarding environmental damage, gentrification, and trust in Quadrozzi himself eventually scrapped this proposal.
