= Type C6 ship =

MARAD ship designation

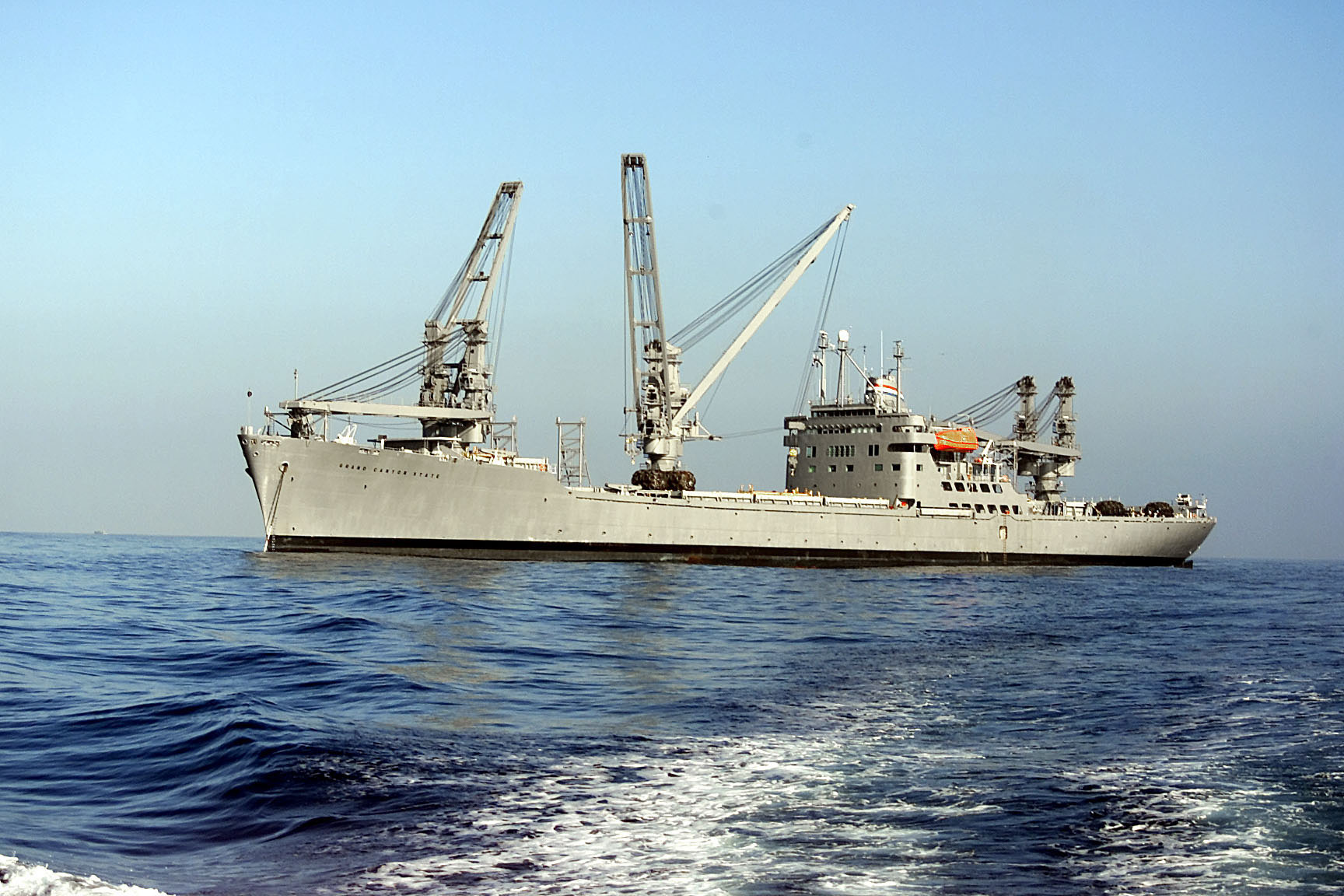
- Type C6 ship SS Grand Canyon State as a converted auxiliary crane ship.

Class overview
- Builders: Alabama Drydock and Shipbuilding, Mobile, Alabama (MA-8 and MA-10); Bethlehem Steel, Key Highway Yard, Baltimore, Maryland (MA-12 and MA-15); Ingalls Shipbuilding (West Yard), Pascagoula, Mississippi (MA164-166; MA-244 - MA-247); Norfolk Shipbuilding and Drydock, Norfolk, Virginia (MA-14); Todd Shipyards, Galveston, Texas (MA-9 and MA-13); Todd Shipyards, Brooklyn, New York (MA-30); Todd Shipyards, Seattle, Washington (MA-164 - MA-166)
- Operators: United States Maritime Commission
- Preceded by: Type C4 and C5 class ships
- Succeeded by: Type C7 container ship
- Subclasses: Four
- Completed: 19
- Laid up: 3 (NDRF)
- Scrapped: 16

General characteristics
- Type: C6-S-1qa partial container ship (3 converted from C4-S-1a); C6-S-1w container ship (8 converted from C4-S-1a); C6-S-85a container ship (4 new built); C6-S-85b container ship (3 new built)
- Tonnage: 16,820 gross tons (C6-S-1qa); 15,830 gross tons C6-S-1w; 21,150 gross tons C6-S-85a; 21,500 gross tons C6-S-85b
- Length: 668.65 ft (203.80 m) C6-S-1qc; 661.17 ft (201.52 m) C6-S-1w; 669.67 ft (204.12 m) C6-S-85a
- Beam: 76 ft (23 m) C6-S-1qc; 76 ft (23 m) C6-S-1w; 90 ft (27 m) C6-S-85a
- Draft: 33.08 ft (10.08 m) C6-S-1qc; 27 ft (8.2 m) C6-S-1w; 29 ft (8.8 m) C6-S-85a
- Speed: 19.5 - 22.5 knots
- Range: 13,700 miles (C6-S-1qc); 9,400 miles (C6-S-1w); 16,200 miles (C6-S-85a)
- Complement: Varied by design type

The Type C6 ship is a United States Maritime Administration (MARAD) designation for a container ship developed during the transition years from moving goods by breakbulk cargo to containerization. The Type C4 ships Mariner class, arranged with its house/engine-room in the center of the vessel with cargo hatches at 4 forward and 2 aft, was very successful. Eleven of these Mariner ships were converted into Type C6 container ships, and eight vessels were new built. As of September 2023 only three C6 ships, the converted C4s, are extant. All three are crane ships in the National Defense Reserve Fleet.

== American President Lines ==
Three vessels of the American President Lines had been built in 1966 as Type C4-S-1qa ships by National Steel and Shipbuilding, San Diego, California. Between 1972 and 1973 these breakbulk cargo vessels were converted into partial containerships. The conversion work was done at Todd Pacific Shipyards, Seattle, Washington. Overall length was extended by 105 ft. Bow thrusters were also fitted into the ships for improved maneuverability along with an improved stabilization system. Between 1984-1986 all three vessels were acquired by the U.S.Navy and re-fitted as Auxiliary Crane Ships for use by the Military Sealift Command (C6-S-MA1qd). As of September 2023 all three of these converted vessels were listed in the Ready Reserve Force, National Defense Reserve Fleet.

Type C4-S-1qa Breakbulk Cargo Ship conversions to Type C6-S-1qa Container Ship
| Original name | MARAD No. | National Steel hull no. | Notes |
|---|---|---|---|
| President Polk (3) | MA-164 | 338 | 1986 conversion to a crane ship at Dillingham Ship Repair (Portland, OR); renamed Grand Canyon State (T-ACS 3) |
| President Monroe (3) | MA-165 | 339 | 1986 conversion to a crane ship at Dillingham Ship Repair (Portland, OR); renamed Gem State (T-ACS 2) |
| President Harrison (3) | MA-166 | 340 | 1984 conversion to a crane ship at Manitowoc (WI); renamed Keystone State (T-ACS 1) |

The American President lines also took delivery on four new built ships, designated Type C6-S-85b, the Pacesetters, from Ingalls Shipbuilding in Pascagoula, Mississippi. Three were delivered in 1973 and the fourth in 1974. Between 1979 and 1982 the vessels were traded in to MARAD as partial down payment for new ships. They were first laid up at the Suisun Bay Reserve Fleet but were eventually scrapped.

New built C6-S-85b Container Ships
| Ship Name | MARAD No. | Ingalls Hull No. | Notes |
|---|---|---|---|
| President Jefferson (3) | MA-248 | 1184 | Scrapped 2001 |
| President Madison (4) | MA-249 | 1185 | Scrapped 1999 |
| President Pierce (3) | MA-250 | 1186 | Scrapped 2005 |
| President Johnson (5) | MA-255 | 1187 | Scrapped 1999 |

== United States Lines ==
The United States Lines choose all 8 of their C4-S-1a cargo vessels for conversion to C6-S-1w container ships. The conversion work was divided among five shipyards, and the vessels re-entered service between late 1970 and early 1971. The vessel overall length was increased by approximately 100 ft. The vessels remained in service until 1983 when they were laid-up at New York City but by 1987 all eight vessels were scrapped.

Type C4-S-1a conversions to Type C6-S-1w Container Ship
| C6 Ship Name | MARAD No./Name | Original builder/ hull No./year | Rebuilder | Notes |
|---|---|---|---|---|
| American Archer | MA-8/Cotton Mariner | Ingalls / 461/ 1953 | Alabama Dry Dock & Shipbuilding | Pioneer Mist 1956-1970. Laid up 1983, Scrapped 1985 in Kaohsiung |
| American Legend | MA-9/Pelican Mariner | Ingalls/ 462/ 1954 | Todd Shipyards, Galveston | Pioneer Myth 1956-1971. Laid up 1983, Scrapped 1986 in Kaohsiung, Taiwan. |
| American Argosy | MA-10/Peninsula Mariner | Ingalls /463 /1954 | Alabama Drydock and Shipbuilding | Pioneer Main 1956-1970. Laid up 1983, Scrapped 1986 in Kaohsiung, Taiwan. |
| American Accord | MA-12/Mountain Mariner | Bethlehem Sparrows Point Shipyard /4508 /1953 | Bethlehem Steel Key Highway Yard | Pioneer Mart 1956-1971. Laid up 1983, Scrapped 1986 in Kaohsiung, Taiwan. |
| American Leader (3) | MA-13/Gopher Mariner | Bethlehem Sparrows Point Shipyard /4509 /1954 | Todd Shipyards, Galveston | Pioneer Minx 1956-1970. Laid up 1983, Scrapped 1985 Castellon de la Plana, Spain. |
| American Alliance | MA-14/Show Me Mariner | Bethlehem Sparrows Point Shipyard /4510 /1954 | Norfolk Shipbuilding | Pioneer Mill 1956-1970. Laid up 1983, Scrapped 1987 in Kaohsiung. |
| American Ace | MA-15/Sunflower Mariner | Bethlehem Sparrows Point Shipyard /4510 /1954 | Bethlehem Steel Key Highway Yard | Pioneer Moor 1956-1970. Laid up 1983, Scrapped 1986 in Kaohsiung, Taiwan. |
| American Legacy | MA-30/Silver Mariner | New York Ship/ 496/ 1954 | Todd Shipyards, Brooklyn | Pioneer Ming 1956-1970. Laid up 1983, Scrapped 1986 Castellon de la Plana, Spain. |

== Farrell Lines ==
The Farrell Lines commissioned naval architect George G. Sharp to develop a design for their rapidly growing services. The four new-built vessels were designated as Type C6-S-85a by the Maritime Commission. The vessels were built at the Ingalls Shibuilding(West Yard) with delivery starting in December 1970. The ships operated between U.S. Atlantic and Gulf of Mexico ports and to Australia and New Zealand. All four vessels were eventually acquired by Horizon Lines and remained in service until 2014. Ex-Astral Endurance was scrapped in 2014 after Horizon reduced the frequency of service between Puerto Rico and the US. In December 2014 Horizon ended all service to Puerto Rico and sold the former Austral Entente to All Star Metals LLC, Brownsville, Texas, for demolition in the US, though the vessel was subsequently towed to India. Ex-Austral Ensign, after having been laid up Bellingham, WA since 2007, was sold for scrap in April 2016. The remaining Farrell Lines ship, ex-Austral Envoy, was last named Matson Navigator and sold for scrap in 2018.

New build C6-S-85a Container Ships
| Original name | MARAD No. | Ingalls hull no. | Notes |
|---|---|---|---|
| Austral Envoy | MA-244 | 1180 | Modified to Type C8 in 1984, later Matson Navigator (IMO 7116315); scrapped 2018. |
| Austral Ensign | MA-245 | 1181 | Later Horizon Fairbanks (IMO 7218462); scrapped 2016 |
| Austral Endurance | MA-246 | 1182 | Later Horizon Hawaii (IMO 7233278); scrapped 2014 |
| Austral Entente | MA-247 | 1183 | Later Type C8 Horizon Trader (IMO 7326233); sold for scrapping 2015. |
