= Todd Shipyards =

American shipbuilding and ship repair company

Todd Shipyards Corporation
- Todd's logo in 2011
- Formerly: William H. Todd Corporation
- Industry: Shipbuilding; Ship repair
- Founded: 1916
- Founder: William H. Todd
- Defunct: 2011
- Fate: Acquired by Vigor Industrial
- Successor: Vigor Shipyards
- Subsidiaries: Todd Pacific Shipyards (Seattle Division, Los Angeles Division)

The Todd Shipyards Corporation, commonly known as Todd Shipyards, was an American shipbuilding and ship repair company. Founded in 1916 as the William H. Todd Corporation, the company produced many ships during World War I and was a major part of the Emergency Shipbuilding Program during World War II. At its peak, the company owned and operated shipyards on the West Coast of the United States, East Coast of the United States, and the Gulf.

In the post-war years, Todd Shipyards performed building and maintenance work for, among others, the United States Navy and Royal Australian Navy, the United States Coast Guard, and the Washington State Ferries. The company filed for bankruptcy in 1987 after years of financial struggles. It resumed operations in 1991 as the Todd Pacific Shipyards Corporation after closing all locations except for its shipyard in Seattle, Washington. (Note: The Todd Pacific Shipyards Corporation was a subsidiary of the Todd Shipyards Corporation created in 1977, combining the company's divisions in Seattle and Los Angeles.)

The company continued more limited operations in the Puget Sound region of Washington until it was acquired by Vigor Industrial in 2011. Todd Shipyards became a wholly owned subsidiary of Vigor and operated under the name Vigor Shipyards for a number of years.

== History ==
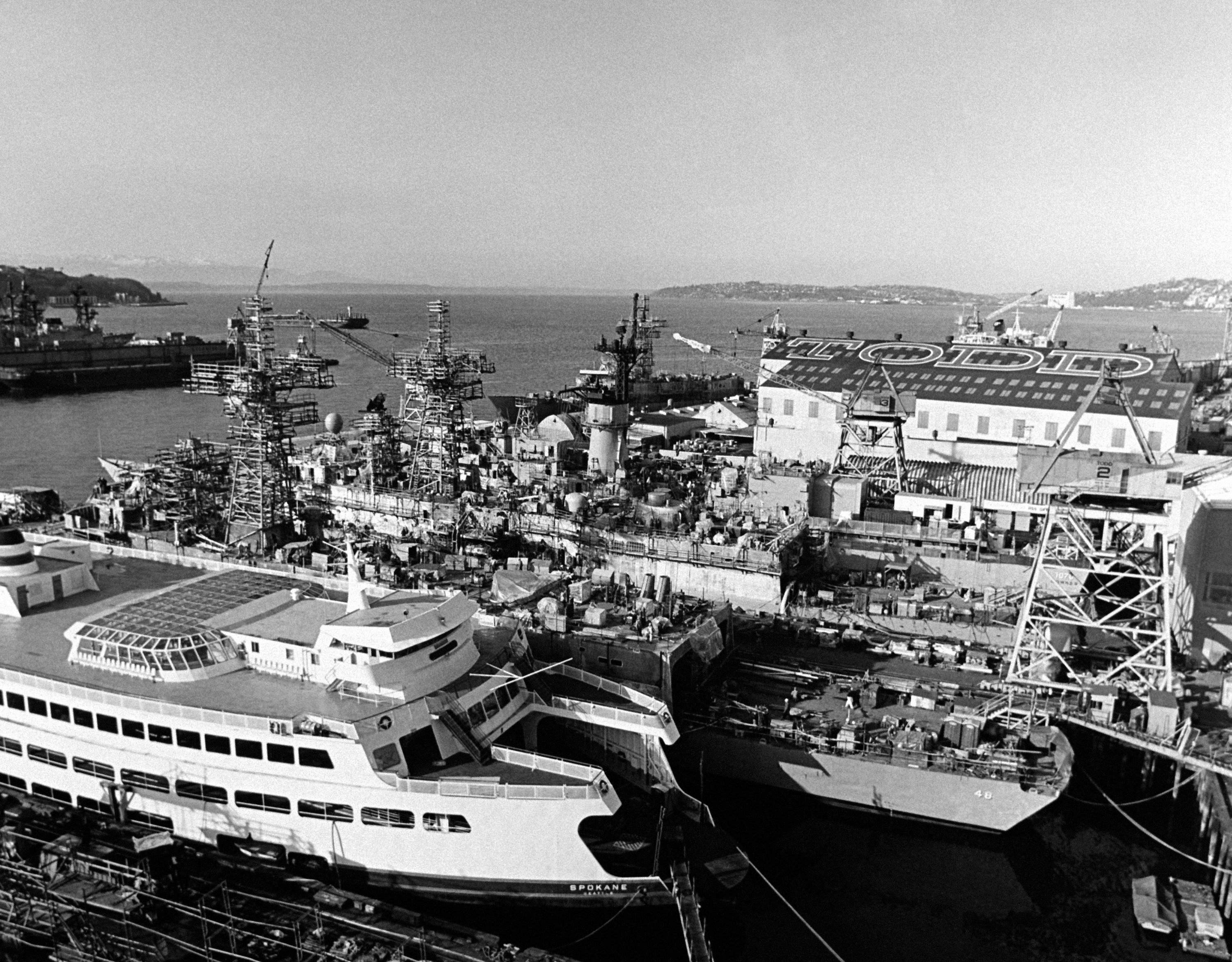
From bottom left: MV Spokane, USS Vandegrift (FFG-48), USS Halyburton (FFG-40), and USS Downes (FF-1070) at Todd Shipyards in Seattle, 1983

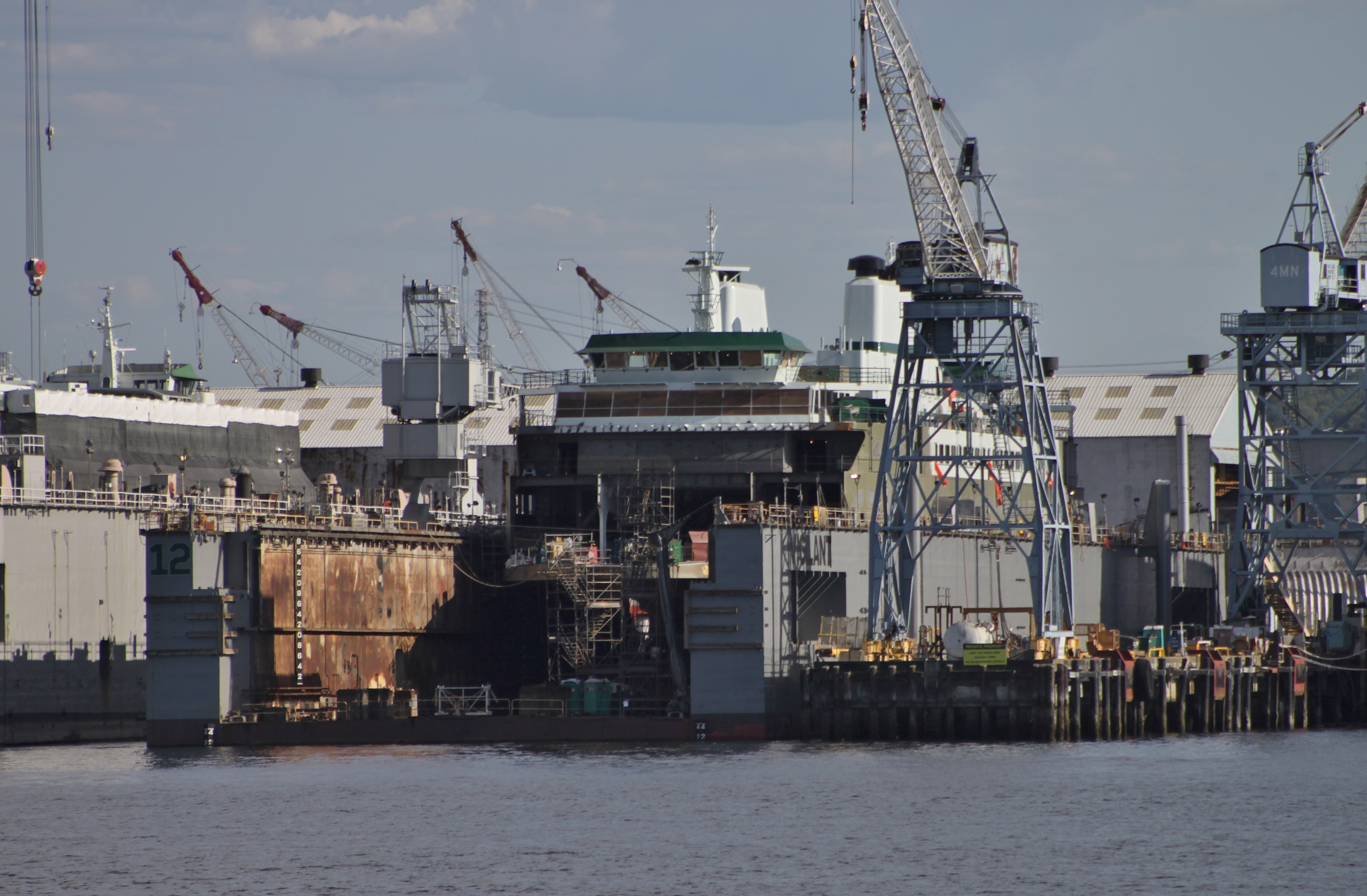
MV Chimacum under construction at Vigor Shipyards in 2016

=== Early history ===
Todd Shipyards was founded in 1916 as the William H. Todd Corporation when properties of the Tietjen & Lang Dry Dock Company of Hoboken, New Jersey, were bought in 1916 by a syndicate headed by Bertron Griscom & Company of New York and placed under management of William H. Todd, president of the Robins Dry Dock & Repair Company in Brooklyn, New York. That acquisition was followed by acquisition of the Tebo Yacht Basin, Brooklyn, and the Seattle Construction and Dry Dock Company.

=== World War II ===
From 1940 to 1945, during World War II, Todd Shipyards built or repaired 23,000 ships in many shipyards with 57,000 workers. Todd ranked 26th among United States corporations in the value of World War II production contracts.

=== Post-war development ===
In October 1977, the company created the Todd Pacific Shipyards Corporation as a wholly owned subsidiary by combining its Seattle Division and Los Angeles Division.

The Todd Shipyards Corporation was impacted by the 1983 Pacific Coast Metal Trades Union strike.

Todd Shipyards filed for Chapter 11 bankruptcy in 1987. The company came out of Chapter 11 protection in 1991 as the Todd Pacific Shipyards Corporation after having shuttered all of its locations except for its shipyard in Seattle.

In 1995 Todd branched out and started a radio subsidiary company called Elettra Broadcasting Corporation. Elettra Broadcasting operated three FM radio stations in Carmel.

=== Acquisition by Vigor Industrial ===
In February 2011, Vigor Industrial purchased Todd Shipyards for US$130 million. This included Todd's shipyards in Seattle, Everett, and Bremerton. The company became a wholly owned subsidiary of Vigor and began operating as Vigor Shipyards after the acquisition.

== Todd Shipyards locations ==
Hidden anchors in the article
- #Brooklyn
- #Hoboken
- #Alameda
- #Galveston
- #Houston Irish Bend
- #Houston Green Bayou
- #Robins Dry Dock and Repair Company

=== New York ===
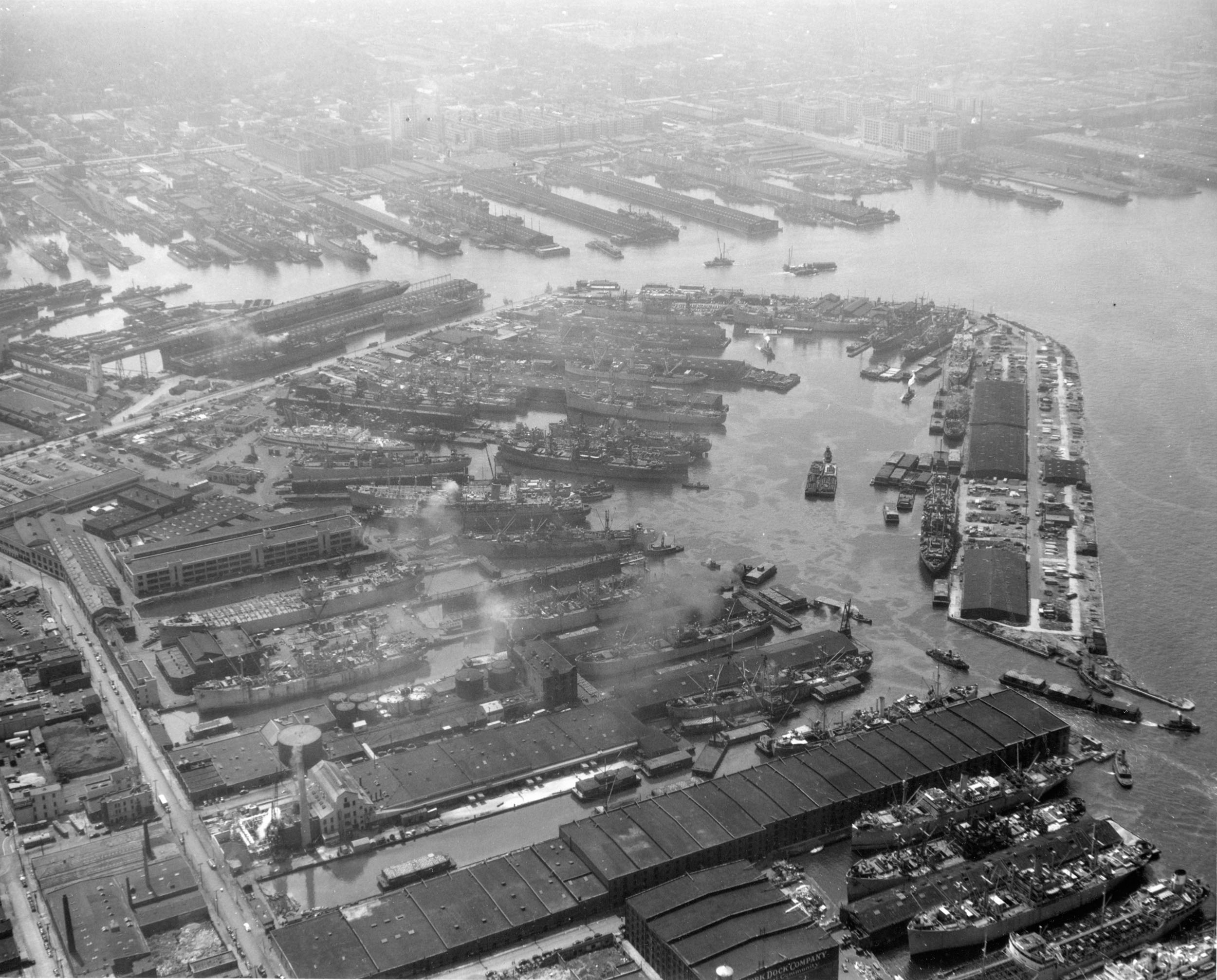
The Erie Basin in 1945

- Todd Brooklyn. Todd Shipyard's first facility was acquired in 1916, in Erie Basin in Brooklyn, New York, along the waterfront of the Red Hook neighborhood. As background, Erie Basin dry dock was the first graving dock in the United States, built at the site in 1866. J. N. Robins Company acquired it in 1869, then merged with Erie Basin Dry Dock Company, started by Delamater Iron Works, and was renamed the Robins Dry Dock and Repair Company. William H. Todd had worked for both Erie Basin Dry Dock and Robins Dry Dock. In 1916, Todd and some of his associates purchased Robins Dry Dock and Repair Company, the Tietjen & Lang Dry Dock Company of Hoboken in Weehawken Cove, the Seattle Construction and Drydock Company on the West Coast, the Tebo Yacht Basin Company, and the Gowanus shipyard in Brooklyn. The Erie Basin yard was sold in 1986 to Rodermond Industries, which closed in the 1990s.

=== Los Angeles and San Francisco ===
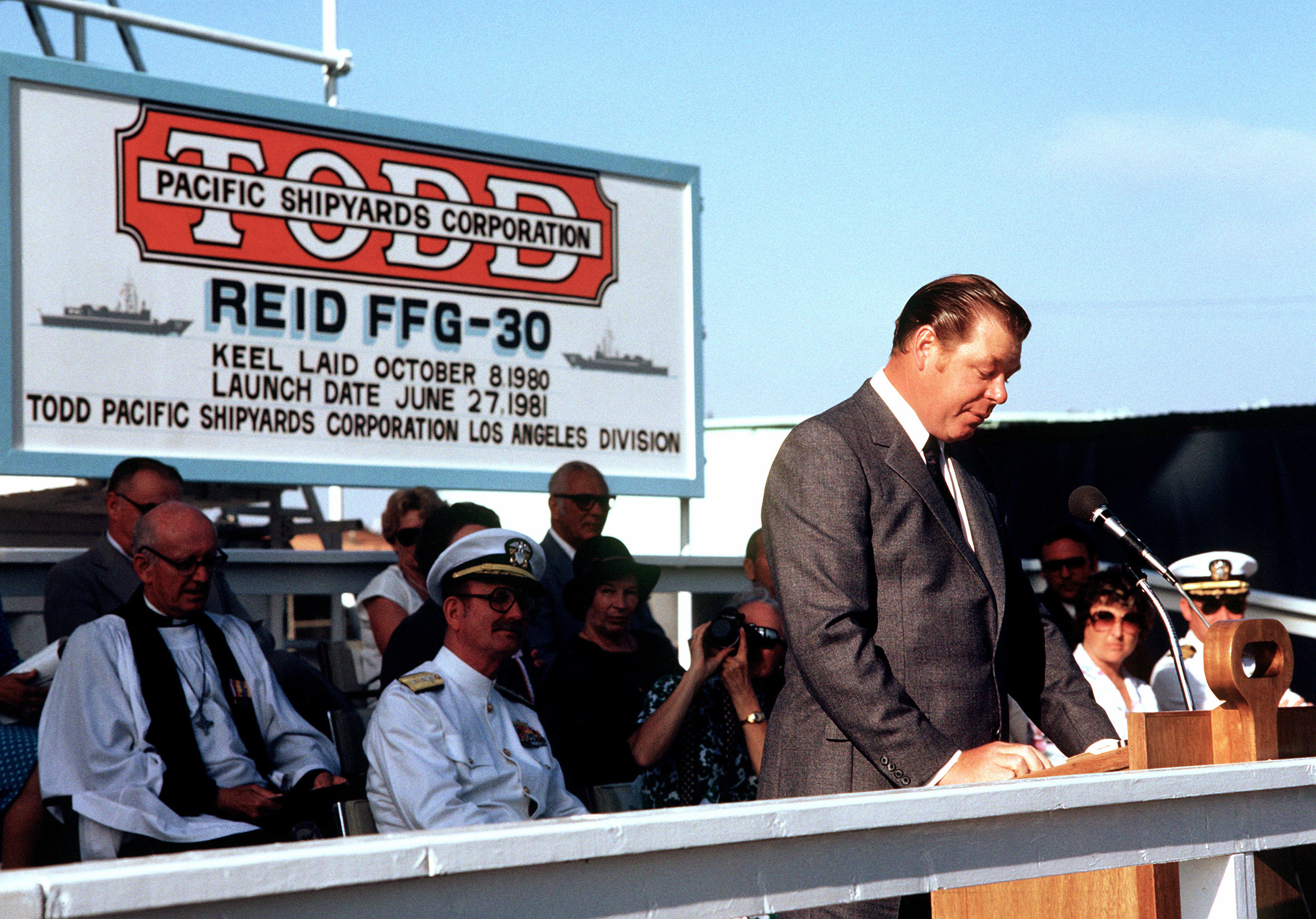
Vice President of Todd Pacific Shipyards Corporation, Hans K. Schaefer, speaks during christening and launching ceremonies for the guided missile frigate USS Reid (FFG-30) at the Todd Pacific Shipyards Corp., Los Angeles Division, in 1981

- Todd Pacific Shipyards, Los Angeles Division, San Pedro, California, (33.753°N 118.280°W) was formerly Los Angeles Shipbuilding & Dry Dock Corporation, opened in 1917 and closed in 1989. From 1918 to 1924 Los Angeles Shipbuilding built cargo ships for the United States Shipping Board. In the 1920 and 1930 Los Angeles Shipbuilding built tankers and ferries. For World War II they yard built the USS Ajax (AR-6), USS Hector (AR-7), USS Jason (AR-8), Seaplane tender and Klondike-class destroyer tenders. Post war the yard was sold to Todd. Todd built Allende-class frigate at the site and in Seattle, also built were Shenandoah-class destroyer tender and Leahy-class cruiser. The yard closed was following completion of its Oliver Hazard Perry-class frigate contract and after failing to win an Arleigh Burke-class destroyer contract. Property is now part of the Port of Los Angeles, and has been completely converted into Berth 100 / West Basin Container Terminal.

- Todd Alameda (San Francisco Division), Alameda, California. to the west of Webster Street (37.79057°N 122.28812°W). Opened in 1940 by the United Engineering Company. Mostly used as a repair or conversion facility, it was closed in 1956. The Bethlehem Alameda Works Shipyard to the east of Webster Street was leased by Todd according to, but the Corps of Engineers survey 1953 claims it was owned and operated by Bethlehem.
- Richmond shipyard No. 1 was a new shipyard built to support the demand for ships for World War 2. Kaiser purchased the contact and the Richmond yard to build type Ocean ship from the Todd Shipyards in 1940. Todd then Kaiser built yard No. 1 to build the Ocean ships. Yard No. 1 was built on unoccupied land with construction starting in December 1940. In April 1941 the keel for the first British bound Ocean ship was laid. The next series of ships built were Liberty ships, with the first keel laid on May 15, 1942. Needing faster cargo ships the next series of ships built were Victory ships, with the first keel laid on January 17, 1944. After the war, in 1946, the yard closed. Kaiser Richmond No. 1 Yard was at 700 Wright Ave, Richmond on the Parr Canal. The site now has general docks for construction supplies. Located at GPS 37.920887°N 122.362920°W. Built at Kaiser Richmond No. 1 Yard:* Ocean ship, 30 cargo ships, 7,174 GRT. (sometimes credited to Todd Shipyards Corporation), * Liberty ship, 138 model EC2-S-C1 ships, 7,176 GRT., * Victory ship, 82 Model VC2-S-AP3 ships, 7,612 GRT.,Notable ships: Ocean Victory, Ocean Vigour, Chief Ouray, Logan Victory and Northeastern Victory.

=== Puget Sound, Washington ===
- Todd Tacoma Division, Commencement Bay, Tacoma, Washington opened in 1917 to build Design 1014 ship ships for the United States Shipping Board. It operated as part of Todd Dry Dock & Construction until shut down after World War I in 1924. The yard reopened in partnership with Kaiser Shipbuilding in 1939 as Seattle-Tacoma Shipbuilding Corporation. The yard built 56 Bogue and Commencement Bay-class escort carriers and various auxiliaries. In 1942 Todd bought out Kaiser's share and the yard eventually became part of Todd Pacific Shipyards. Sold to the Navy after World War II, further sold to the Port of Tacoma in 1959. The site today is the Commencement Bay Industrial Development District.
- Todd Dry Dock & Construction Co. of Seattle, Washington (47.586°N 122.357°W) was started in 1916 when Todd bought Seattle Construction & Dry Dock Co. Ltd. Seattle Construction & Dry Dock Co. Ltd. was in the past Seattle Dry Dock & Shipbuilding Company started by Robert Moran and his brothers as ship repair shop in Seattle in 1882. The yard was destroyed by fire in 1889 and then rebuilt as Moran Brothers Company. For World War II the yard built 45 Gleaves, Fletcher, Allen M. Sumner and Gearing-class destroyers under the name Seattle-Tacoma Shipbuilding Corporation. After the war the yard was renamed Todd Shipyards Corp., Seattle Division. For the US Navy built Charles F. Adams-class destroyer, Knox-class frigates, Oliver Hazard Perry-class frigates, Hamilton-class cutters. As of 2025, the yard is owned and operated by Vigor.

- Todd Bremerton Shipyard in Bremerton, Washington (47.561788°N 122.635875°W) is a satellite ship repair yard. Close to the Puget Sound Naval Shipyard. Todd Bremerton Shipyard works on US Navy ships.

- Todd Everett Shipyard in 2008 Tood purchased Everett Shipyard, Inc. in Everett, Washington (47.989347°N 122.219381°W). The site, Everett Ship Repair & Drydock, Inc., will continue ship repair work. Since 1960, the yard has served the Washington State Ferries and the United States Navy.

=== Houston / Galveston ===
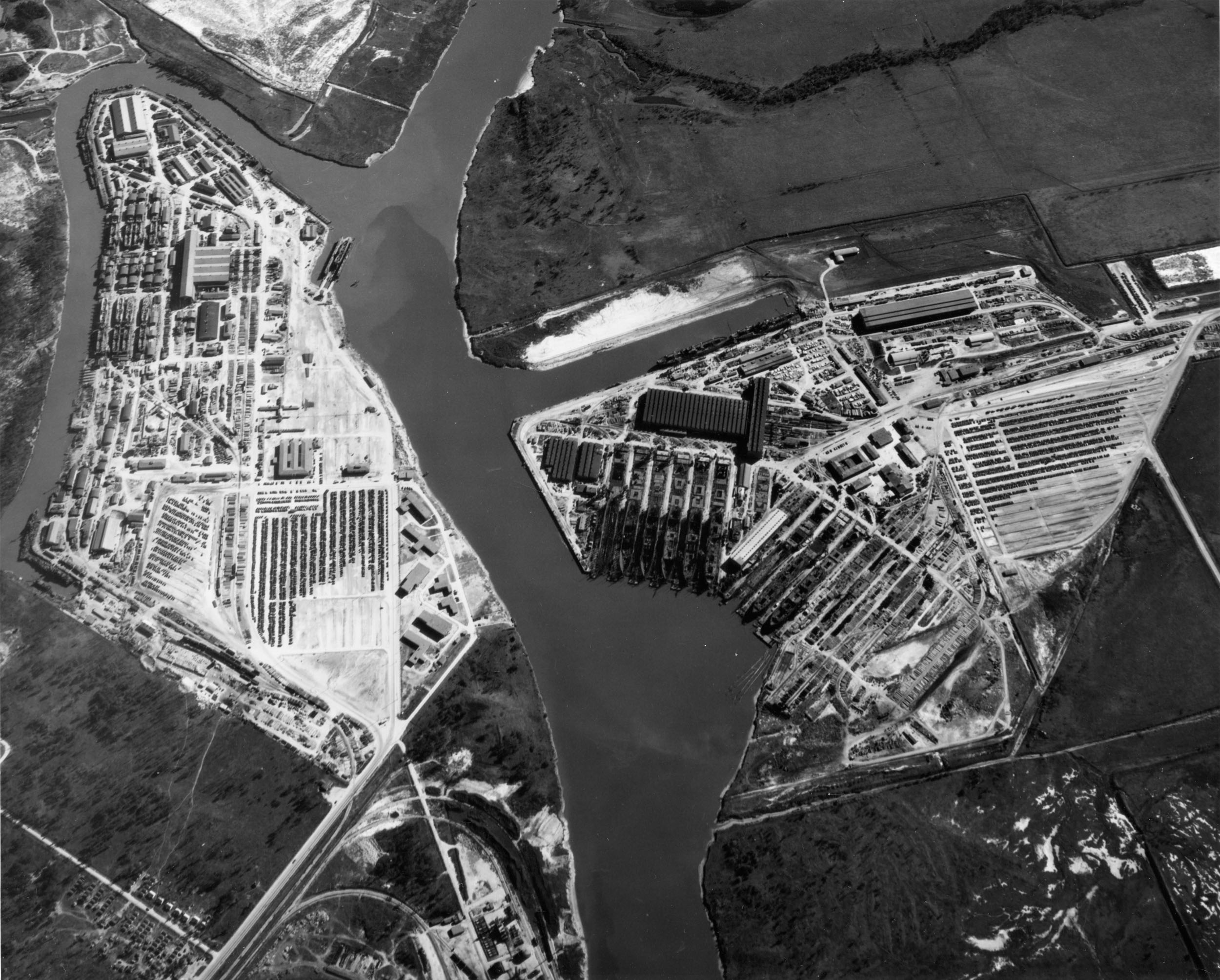
Houston shipyard (right) and Brown Shipbuilding, later Todd Houston (left), in 1944

- Todd Galveston, Texas (29.3154°N 94.794°W) opened in 1934. Todd took over the Galveston Dry Dock & Construction on Pelican Island. In 1943 Todd took over the yard next door, Gray's Iron Works and renamed the yards Todd Galveston Drydocks, Inc.. For World War II the yard built T1 Tankers T1-M-A1. Post-war they built three ferries for Texas. In 1949 Todd moved the main operation to the Brown Shipbuilding yard in Houston that they had leased. The Pelican Island Galveston yard was used only for ship repair and in 1965 also started tanker conversions, as Todd Shipyards Corporation, Galveston Division. Todd Galveston built Type C6 ships. Todd Galveston yard went into Chapter 11 and closed in 1990. The yard was sold. The yard had two Panamax floating dry-docks that were moved to the Alabama Shipyard and Bender Shipbuilding. In 1993, the remainder of Todd Galveston on Pelican Island was sold to the Port of Galveston. It is now part of Newpark Marine, Gulf Copper runs an offshore repair yard there. Southwest Shipyard now operates a shipyard at the side.

- Todd Houston Shipbuilding, in Houston, Texas, was an emergency shipyard operated by Todd Shipbuilding Corp. and Kaiser Corp. to build ships for World War II. The company was formally established on 6 January 1941. The yard was built at Irish Bend (a former island in the Houston Ship Channel) 29.743268°N 95.179876°W. During the war Todd Houston employed 23,000 workers, built 208 Liberty ships and 14 T1-M-BT2 tankers. In 1946, after the war the yard closed. In 1949 the Brown Shipbuilding yard in Houston, now Todd's, became known as Todd Houston.

- Todd Houston on the Buffalo Bayou (29.7483°N 95.177°W) was opened in 1949, when Todd took over the Brown Shipbuilding's yard at Green's Bayou. Todd ran the yard as a barge construction and repair shop. Todd closed the operation in 1987 selling to Platzer Shipyard. The yard returned to Brown, which renamed it Brown & Root, a construction facility for the offshore drilling industry, which closed in 2004. The site is now the Brown Shipbuilding Industrial.

=== Other ===
- Todd New Orleans, in 1934 Todd joined with Johnson Iron Works in New Orleans to build and repair shipyard called Todd-Johnson Dry Docks. Todd took over the yard and in 1987 sold the yard to Port of New Orleans.
- Todd-Bath Iron Shipbuilding Corporation at South Portland, Maine opened in 1940 as an emergency shipyards to build Ocean class cargo ships for Britain. At the two yards 43.653027°N 70.238267°W, they built Liberty ships, closing after the war. The corporation was renamed New England Shipbuilding in 1943 after Kaiser sold its shares in the corporation. During the war New England Shipbuilding employed 30,000 workers.
- Oregon Shipbuilding Company of Portland, Oregon (45.6312°N 122.7838°W) opened as a World War II emergency yard by Todd and Kaiser. Built in 1941 it opened with 8 shipways, with the high demand for ships it grew to 8 shipways. Soon after the shipyard opened Kaiser bought out Todd share in the shipyard. The yard built Liberty ships and Victory Ships. The yard closed after the war.
- Todd Charleston, from 1946 to 1949 Todd operated for the US Navy the Charleston Dry Dock & Machine Company as repair yard. The yard was located in Charleston, South Carolina, on the Cooper River 32.788711°N 79.924533°W.
- New Jersey Shipbuilding Company, at the US Navy's request for World War II Todd took over New Jersey Shipbuilding to build LCI. Landing Craft LCI(L) in 1942, the yard closed after the war. The yard was in Perth Amboy, New Jersey 40.53469°N 74.25446°W, the site is now Chevron asphalt plant.
- Todd Mobile Drydock, Alabama. In 1936 this repair yard was leased to the nearby Alabama Drydock and Shipbuilding Company and stripped.

== Gallery ==
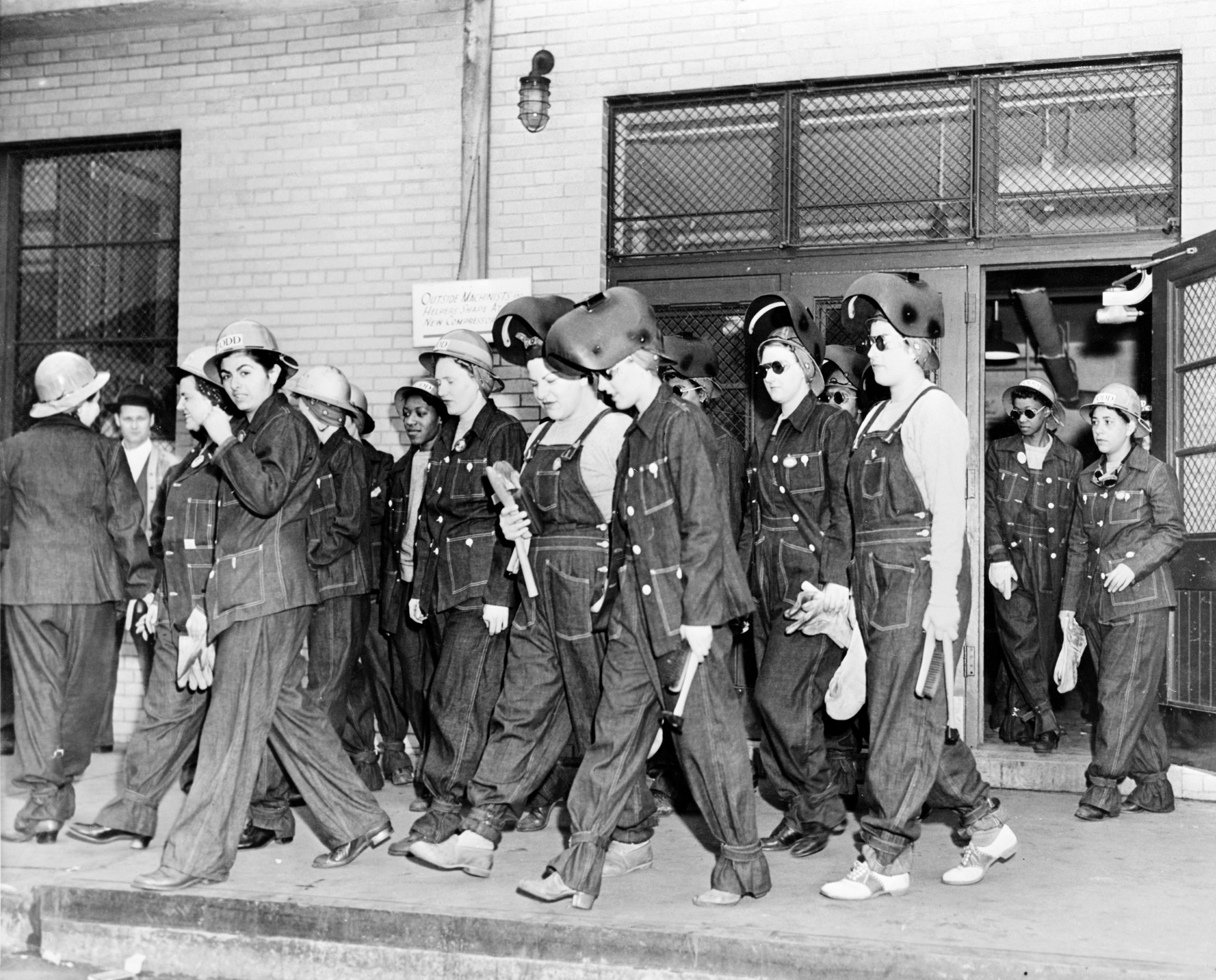
Women welders on the way to their job at the Todd Erie Basin dry dock, circa 1943

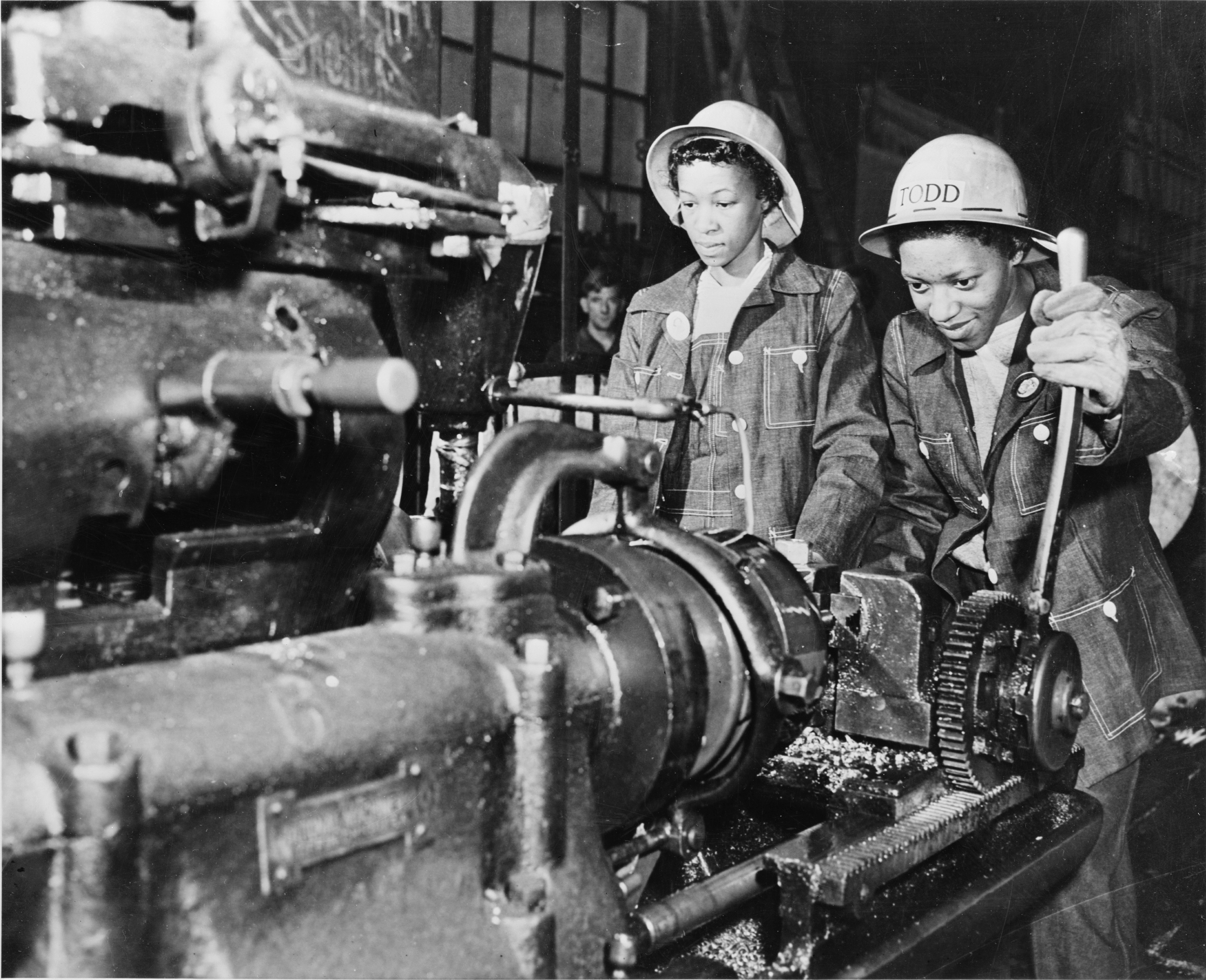
Martha Bryant and Eulalie Hampden operating a bolt cutting machine — World War II home front, Todd Shipyards, Pennsylvania, 1943

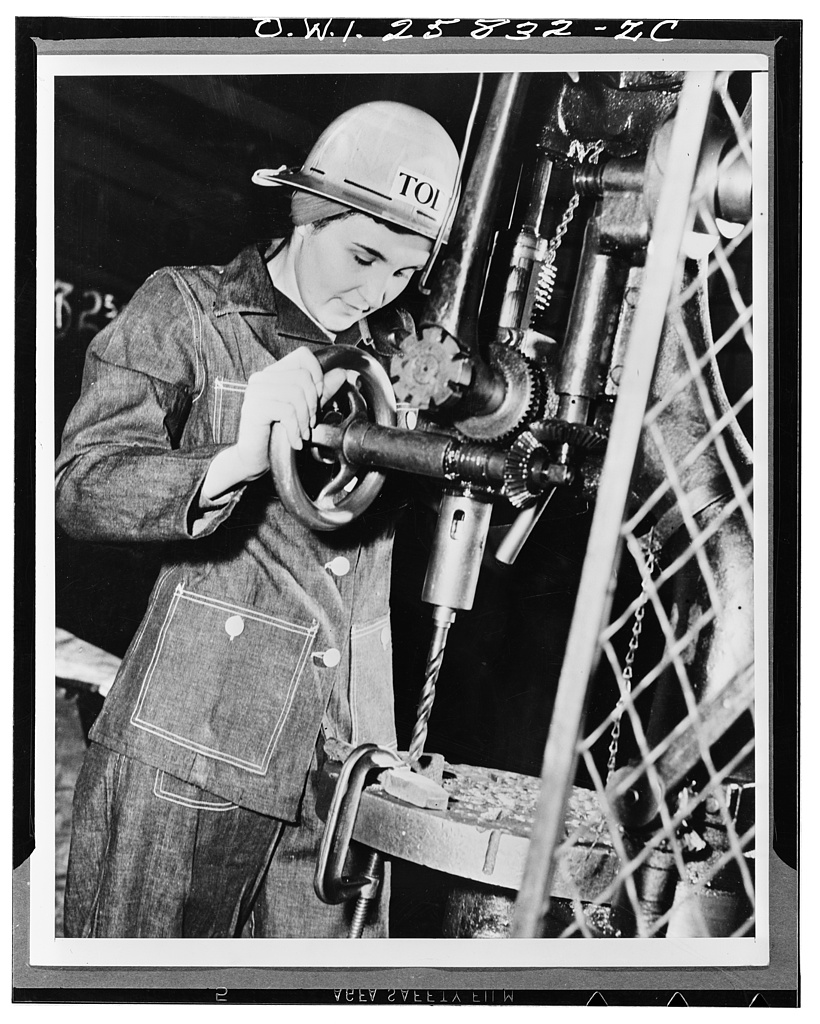
Drill press operator in a Todd Shipyards machine shop, circa 1943

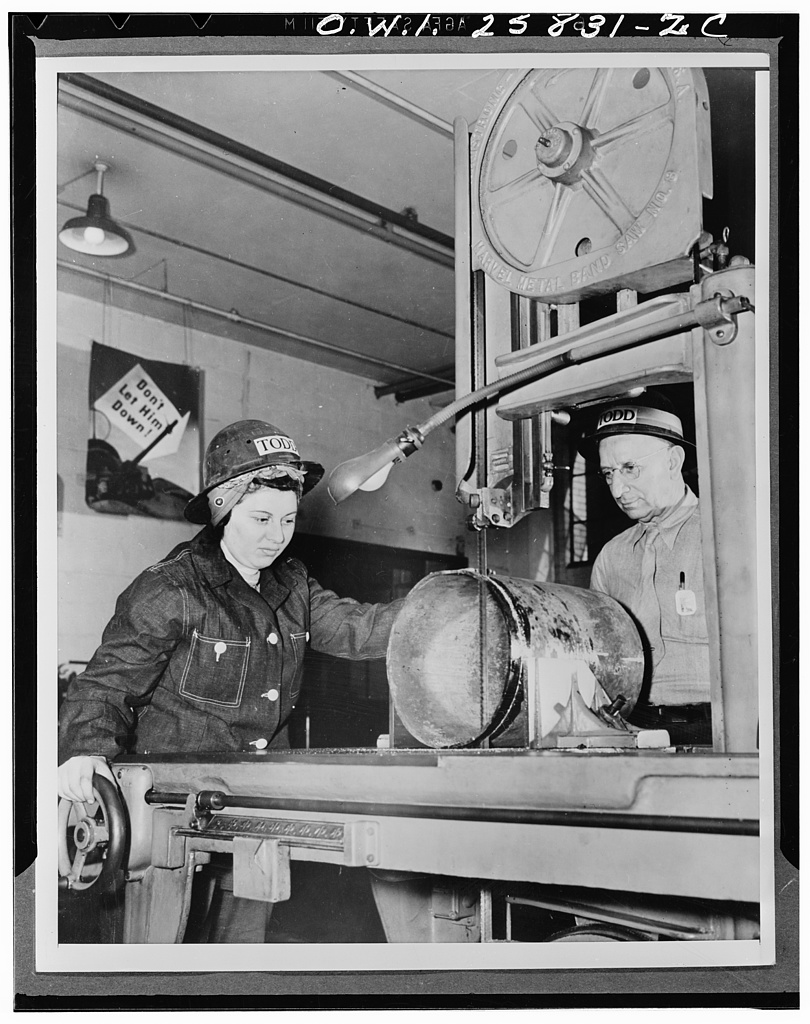
Band saw operator cutting metal pipe in a Todd Shipyards machine shop, circa 1943
