= 1983 Pacific Coast Metal Trades Union strike =

1983 labor strike in the United States

The 1983 Todd Shipyard Strike (Part of the Pacific Coast Metal Trades Union Strike) was a strike action by 10,000 Pacific Coast Metal Trades Union members from July 26 to September 26, 1983, deadlocking business in 9 shipyards. The Todd Shipyards Corporation was significantly impacted by this strike. The bargaining between the unions under the Pacific Coast Metal Trades District Council, and the Pacific Shipbuilders Association led to a new contract, but that did not prevent Todd Shipyards from losing a significant amount of business and subsequent loss of workers in the years that followed.

== Background ==
The Todd Seattle shipyard was one of several yards operated by the New York-based Todd Shipyards Corporation in the 1980s. It was also once the largest shipbuilding company in the United States . The Seattle shipyard was acquired in 1915 along with docks in New Jersey and New York under the William H. Todd Corporation before the company name was changed. During World War I, Todd Shipyards built close to 90% of the U.S. naval convoy, leading to a boom in production and employment figures (18,000 workers on payroll). However at the end of the war, the payroll shrank to 2,000 due to a massive drop in demand.

By the time World War II started, there was again great demand for naval vessels and other shipbuilding services. To fight an effective war at sea, a strong naval fleet was paramount and a priority of the U.S. government. Todd Shipyards was again at the forefront of this labor demand and employed 57,000 workers over the course of the war.

By the late 1970s and early 1980s, civilian contracts were superseded by military contracts yet again in large part due to the Carter and Reagan administrations' defense buildup. By 1983, the company was geared primarily toward military contracts leading to an over-reliance on government contracts (which dwindled)-causing an inevitable fall in profits and work.

In 1981, President Ronald Reagan eliminated a 44-year-old federal shipbuilding subsidy, doubling costs for US shipbuilders such as Todd. Because Todd had significantly higher labor costs than some other US shipyards, it submitted higher bids for Naval contracts, losing the work to other US shipyards. The lack of Naval contracts pressured Todd to resist further pay increases in union contract negotiations.

In 1982, collective bargaining agreements (CBAs) across the United States were running out. The lack of the ability to fund wage increases for American workers was worrisome for industries such as shipbuilding on the West Coast, especially after Ronald Reagan's cuts in shipbuilding subsidies. Industrial production was down nearly nine percent in October 1982 from the previous year, and unemployment was at 10.2% in November.

== Union talks ==
Throughout 1982, with the older contracts coming to a close, a series of talks took place among steel industry representatives, most of which proved unfruitful. And, in the Summer of 1983, the Collective Bargaining Agreement for West coast metal workers expired leaving workers without a contract and with adequate wage guarantees.

The Pacific Coast Metal Trades Union strike lasted from July 26 to September 26, 1983, and in the case of Todd Shipyards was the result of the workers being dissatisfied with a new wage offer (they voted the offer down 6,535 to 54 against). This led to a shortage of metalworkers in the yard-and hence lack of adequate labor to compete for bids. Nine shipyards along the West coast were affected by this strike from San Francisco to Seattle, 11 unions under the Pacific Coast Metal Trades District Council.

== Aftermath ==
With the void in military contracts, forfeit civilian contracts, and now even higher labor costs, Todd Shipyards was struggling to stay afloat. Todd completed its $3 billion contract with the U.S. government in 1983, and began a period of significant decline for the company. In 1986, the Todd Corporation filed for Chapter 11 Bankruptcy. The new Collective Bargaining Agreement reached by the Metalworkers Union did little in terms of preventing the Todd Shipyard from other factors that ultimately contributed to its failure just a few years later. Todd was already struggling with being overpriced in its bids on ship contracts and with the higher wages in the new agreement, this continued. This led to the eventual closure of all shipyards under Todd except for the Seattle shipyard by the end of 1990.

== Re-thinking business ==
With government contracts no longer supplying the lion's share of contracts for Todd, they increasingly turned to smaller civilian jobs, including the construction of Washington State Ferrys and other projects. This was a direct result of a decrease of 45% in government work and increase in profit margins in 1994. In 2011, Todd Shipyards was purchased by Vigor Industrial for about $130 million.
