= 1983 Israel doctors' strike =

1983 strike by doctors in Israel

The 1983 Israel doctors' strike was a 118-day strike by doctors in Israel from March to June 1983.

== History ==
=== Strike ===
On 25 April, Minister of Finance Yoram Aridor made a speech in Knesset in which he accused the striking doctors of "to enrich themselves at the expense of their patients’ health."

In late-May, the Israeli government threatened to call any doctors who served as reservists (around 40% of the striking doctors) up for military duty if they refused to end the strike. In response, the doctors organised a mass departure from the city into rural areas and the seaside, claiming that they were on vacation. On 25 May, the Ministry of Finance launched an advertising campaign publicising the salary scale doctors received, presenting their salaries as high. On 27 May, doctors working for the Clalit Health Services agreed to treat chronically ill patients two days a week.

On 1 June, the Israel Medical Association walked away from negotiations, saying that the government had not presented a new offer and that the negotiations were "useless." On 7 June, doctors announced that they would begin a tactic of ordering as many medical tests as possible from government hospitals for patients, with the goal of driving up the costs the government had to pay.

=== Hunger strikes ===
On 15 June, a number of doctors at the Soroka Medical Center began a hunger strike. The hunger strike quickly spread to doctors in other hospitals.

On 20 June, Israeli media reported that there had been a significant clash within the Israeli cabinet, between Minister of Finance Yoram Aridor and Minister of Health Eliezer Shostak. According to the reports, Aridor opposed a settlement with the doctors and accused Shostak of "creating anarchy in the country," while Shostak proposed accepted the union's offer of arbitration without.

On 23 June, the Rebecca Sieff Hospital announced that it would have to shut down for the duration of the strike, and the Rambam Hospital announced that it would only be able to treat Israeli soldiers wounded in the 1982 Lebanon War. The director of the Beilinson Hospital also announced his resignation in protest against the government. That same day, the Knesset voted 61 to 50 against a no-confidence motion in the government proposed by Hadash. During the debate, Minister of Health Eliezer Shostak accused Labour Alignment MK Yossi Sarid of being a "sheketz meshukatz... despised by all people in the State of Israel," and accused the Labour Alignment that "your hands have spilled this blood, and now those same hands are raised to support a Communist motion."

=== Resolution ===
On 27 June, with 3000 doctors on hunger strikes, the Israeli government announced that it would agree to the union's demand for arbitration. Despite having threatening to resign if the government agreed to arbitration, Minister of Finance Yoram Aridor remained in his post. Following the government's announcement, the doctors agreed to end the strike and return to work. On 7 July, the union and the government signed a formal agreement structuring the arbitration.

In mid-July, the doctors and the government agreed to appoint Israel Atomic Energy Commission director Uzi Eilam as arbitrator. He would have a 40-day period in which to determine a judgment on wages and working hours. In early September 1983, Eilam issued his judgment. The judgment included a 60% wage increase over two years as well as a 45-hour work week.

== Reactions ==
Minister of Social Affairs Aharon Uzan said after the resolution that the government had "made every mistake that could possibly be made." Deputy Prime Minister David Levy stated that the government should have been involved in negotiations sooner.

== Analysis ==
=== Impact of the strike ===
A number of research studies have been carried out examining the impact of the strike on healthcare in Israel. A 1985 study found that "the majority of parents who reported a child's illness did not defer seeking care" during the strike, with parents seeking care from nurses, emergency wards, private clinicians, and the alternative medical care centers set up by the striking doctors instead. A 1990 study found that groups with lower education "reported more need for physicians' care and more damage to health" during the strike, but were also "less critical of the parties involved in the strike."

=== Ethical debates ===
A 1985 paper in the Journal of Medical Ethics detailed several ethical dilemmas raised by the strike, including "the moral and traditional Jewish religious obligations of the doctor, their commitment to socialized medicine, and the compromising of quality of care by overworked physicians."

== Aftermath ==
On 6 July 1983, administrative staff in the Israeli healthcare system staged a one-day strike over wages.
