= Yoram Aridor =

Israeli former politician

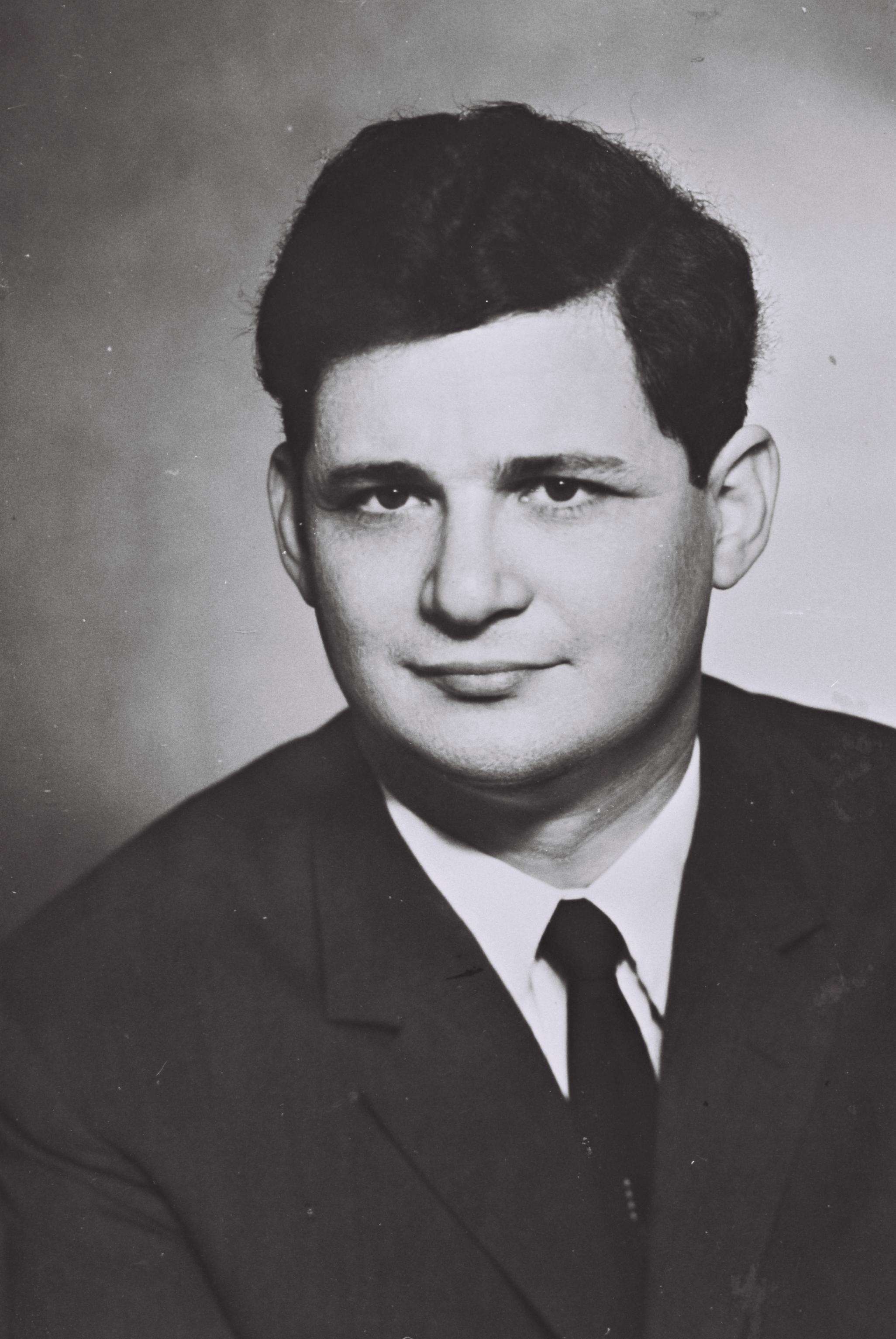
- Aridor in 1969

Ministerial roles
- 1981: Minister of Communications
- 1981–1983: Minister of Finance

Faction represented in the Knesset
- 1969–1974: Gahal
- 1974–1988: Likud

Other roles
- 1990–1992: Permanent Representative to the United Nations

Personal details
- Born: 24 October 1933 (age 93) Tel Aviv, Mandatory Palestine

Yoram Aridor (Hebrew: יורם ארידור; born 24 October 1933) is an Israeli former politician and diplomat. He served as a member of the Knesset from 1969 until 1988, as well as holding two ministerial posts.

== Biography ==
Born in Tel Aviv, Aridor studied law at the Hebrew University of Jerusalem, and practiced law while being active in the Herut movement. He was first elected to the Knesset in 1969 as a member of Gahal, an alliance of Herut and the Liberal Party. Following the 1977 elections he became a deputy minister in Menachem Begin's government.

Aridor's first ministerial appointment was the Minister of Communications, in 1981. In this position, Aridor immediately restored television color broadcasting. In the 1970s, color bursts (the signals encoding colors) were actively removed from IBA transmissions, in an attempt to discourage the population from buying new television sets. Aridor's action led to an increase of his popularity, and boosted his political career.

Two weeks later he was appointed the Minister of Finance, and again took a populist approach, lowering taxes on automobiles and household appliances. As such, his days as finance minister were called the "Merry Aridor Days". The lowering of inflation in Israel during his first years in office is attributed in part to this policy, leading to an increase in government's income from taxes. In subsequent years however, the inflation rose sharply (from 102% in 1981 to 191% in 1983), and as a countermeasure Aridor proposed to peg the Israeli shekel to the US dollar at a fixed exchange rate. He resigned his position on 15 October 1983 due to widespread criticism of his "dollarization plan".

Between 1990 and 1992, Aridor served as the Permanent Representative of Israel to the United Nations. In 2002, he was appointed to the board of directors of Bezeq, by then Minister of Communications Reuven Rivlin. In February 2004, Aridor was appointed chairman of a commission examining state assistance to public institutions, created by the Ministerial Committee on State Audit Affairs.
