= Erie Basin (Brooklyn) =

Shipping facility in Brooklyn, New York

Coordinates: 40°40′08″N 74°00′52″W

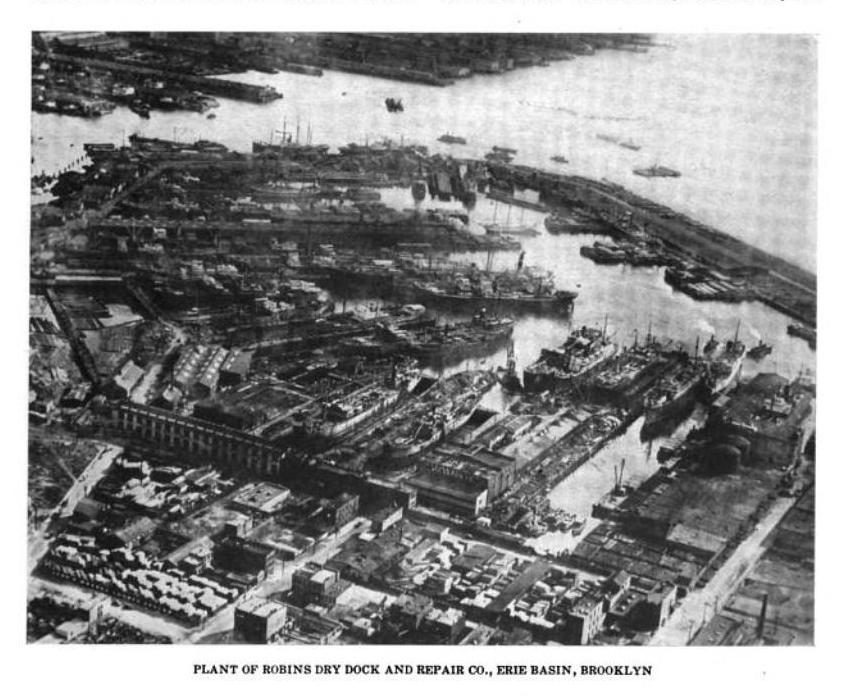
Erie Basin c. 1920

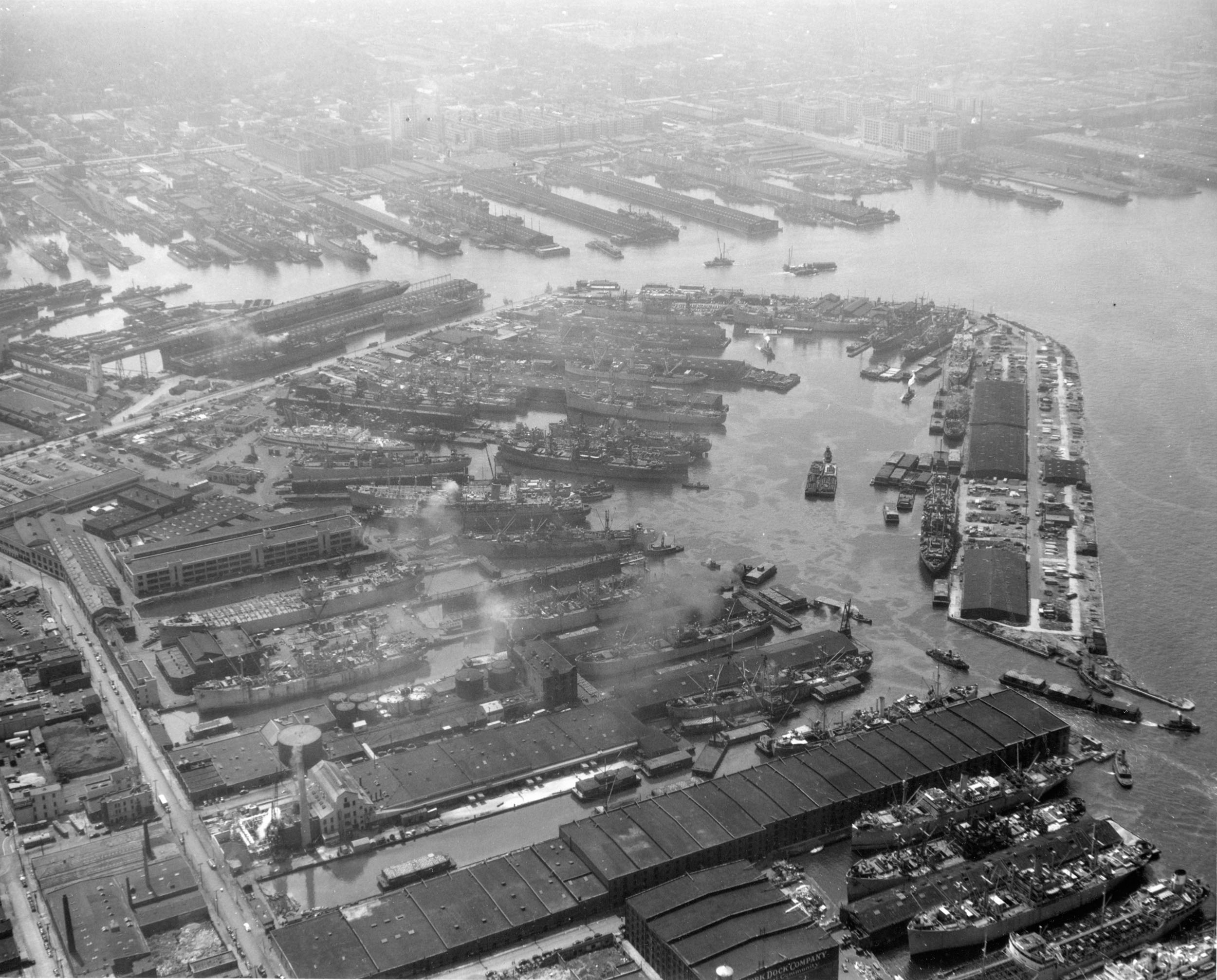
Erie Basin 1945

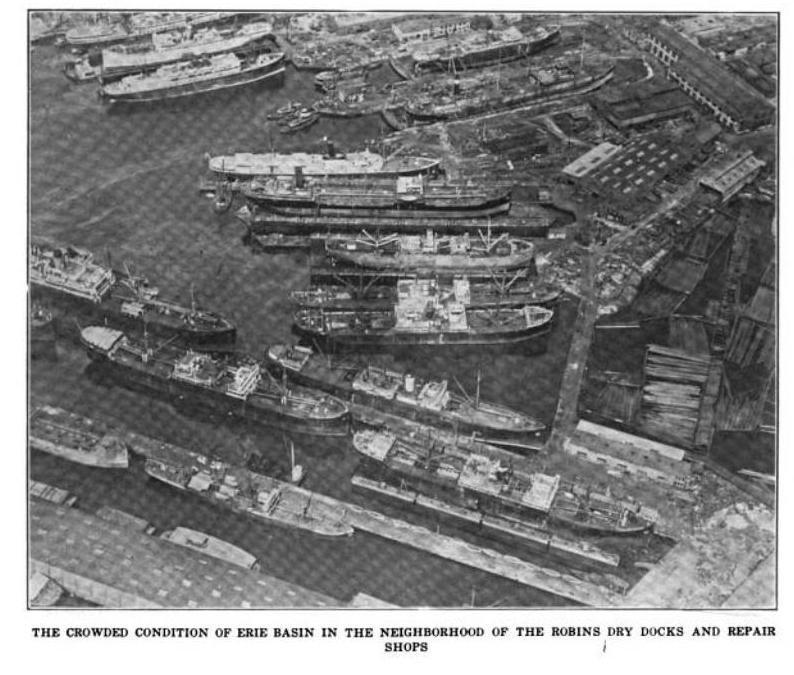
Erie Basin, the "busiest place in the Port of New York" c. 1920

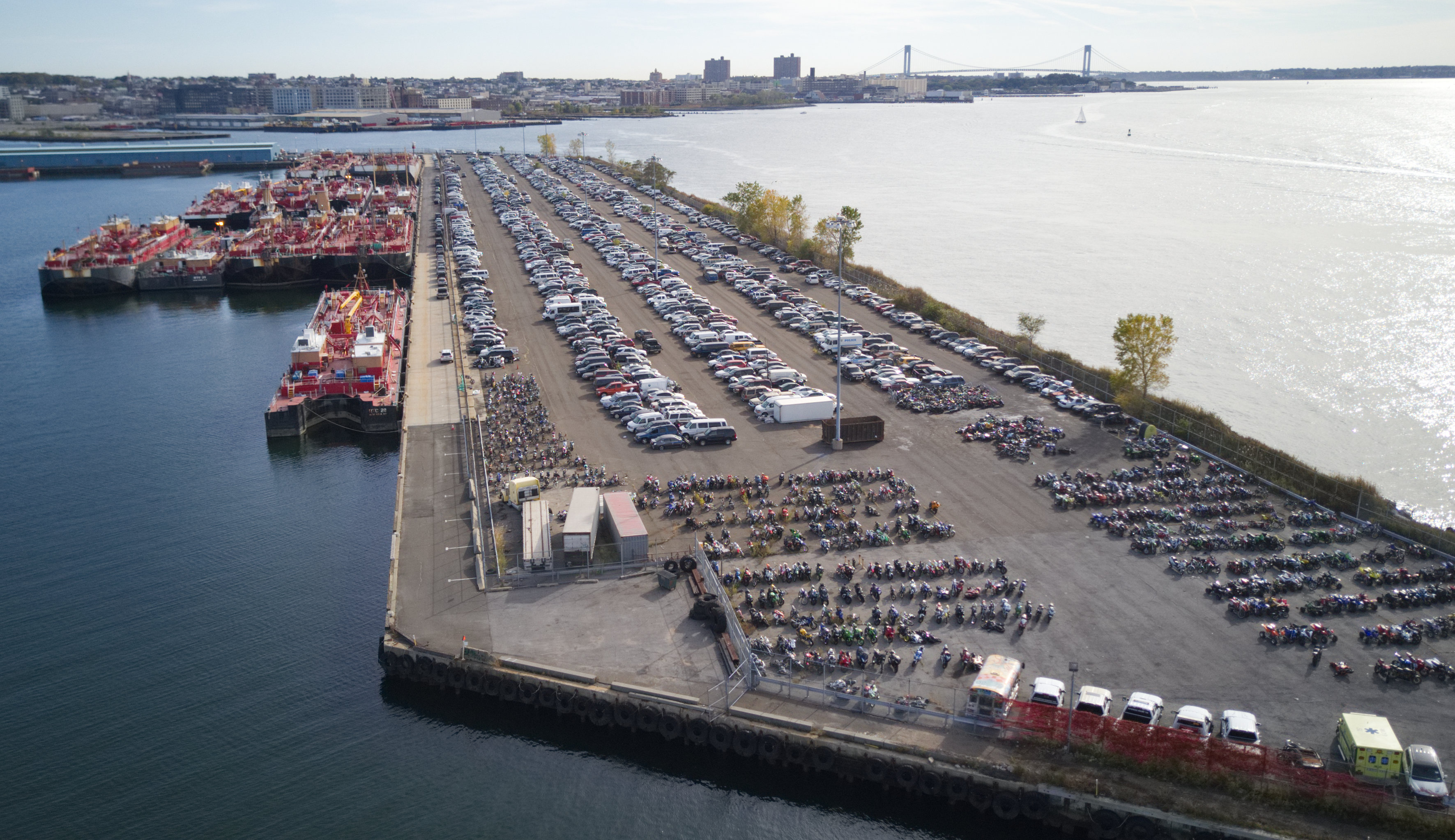
Erie Basin pier in 2017. NYPD vehicle impound lot.

Erie Basin is a man-made harbor and shipping facility in Red Hook, Brooklyn. It is a part of the Port of New York City. Established in 1864, it functions to load and unload ships, store merchandise in warehouses, including grain, and provide dry dock and ship repair services.

== History ==
Colonel Daniel Richards, a successful local merchant, originally envisioned developing the area in 1830s. As early as 1843, William Beard and two brothers, Jeremiah P. Robinson and George Robinson, began purchasing waterfront land piecemeal from a number of old Brooklyn families, and from the town of Brooklyn. Much of the land was marsh, underwater at high tide, and the high ground was scattered with homes. They intended to build an artificially enclosed harbor with shipping facilities. They named it Erie Basin: "Erie" because it initially was designed to process wheat coming down river on barges and ships from the Erie Canal; and "Basin", because a canal basin is a location at the end of a canal where barges can unload, congregate and make repairs.

Beard began work in 1851. He filled in marshes for warehouses, and dredged spaces for deep water. Bulkhead retaining walls replaced the beach. Piers were built out into deeper water. The outer breakwater was built with ballast unloaded by otherwise empty ships arriving from Europe. It was completed by 1864, when the Basin opened for business.

The canal boats and barges served a second function as homes for their crews and crews' families. In the late fall each year, as the canals began to freeze, from 500 to 700 canal boats assembled in Erie Basin for the winter with from 2,000 to 3,000 people living on board.

In the 19th century, the bulk of the shipping trade at the Basin was processing grain grown in the interior of the continent, brought down the Erie Canal by canal boat to Erie Basin, and then overseas by ship. The grain was moved from the canal boats into tall stationary grain elevators on shore, then transferred to large warehouses along Van Brunt Street (called "Stores"), and then into the ships, which docked next to the Stores. This system proved impractical with time as ships grew taller than the warehouses and the basin filled with ships. The land-based grain elevators were torn down and replaced with floating barge grain elevators which could move next to the ships anywhere in the basin. By 1910, most of the warehouses were storing general cargo. This was before trucks could quickly deliver merchandise, thus shipping harbor stores had an important role in buffering the logistics chain.

A 1920 report gives a picture of what kind of businesses were located at the Basin, called "The Busiest Place in the Port of New York":

- The east side of the Basin was leased to the American Molasses Company, where in addition to a large storehouse they built several great tanks for holding thousands of gallons of molasses.
- Theodore A. Crane and Sons shipyard was near the eastern end of the breakwater.
- William J. Gorkey both built and utilized floating drydocks. Gorkey took over his site from the Balance Dry Dock Company.
- Townsend Iron works, run by Rudolph Townsend, repaired ship engines, boilers and the like.
- John B. Caddell also had drydocks and provided carpentry work. That site was previously occupied by the Provincial Dry Dock Company.
- The Brooklyn Spar Yard manufactured wooden ship masts, booms and gaffs. Its prior names were I.P. Jones, Hudson and Langill's, and the Endner Spar Yard.
- Atlantic Basin Iron Works, located on the Van Brunt Street pier, was also in the ship repair business.
- Todd Shipyards Corporation had the largest dry dock, see Erie Basin dry dock.

As the 20th century proceeded, the need to store goods in dockside warehouses diminished as trucks and trains made overland delivery more readily available. The company was losing viability and the Erie Basin was sold to the Port of New York Authority in the 1950s.

Despite the decline in business, the Basin still serves its old functions: grain elevators, warehouses, storage, dry docks and ship repair facilities all still exist and operate in various capacities.

== See also ==
- Gowanus Canal
- Red Hook Grain Terminal
