= Erie Basin dry dock =

Former dock in Brooklyn, New York

Coordinates: 40°40′17.8″N 74°0′49.44″W

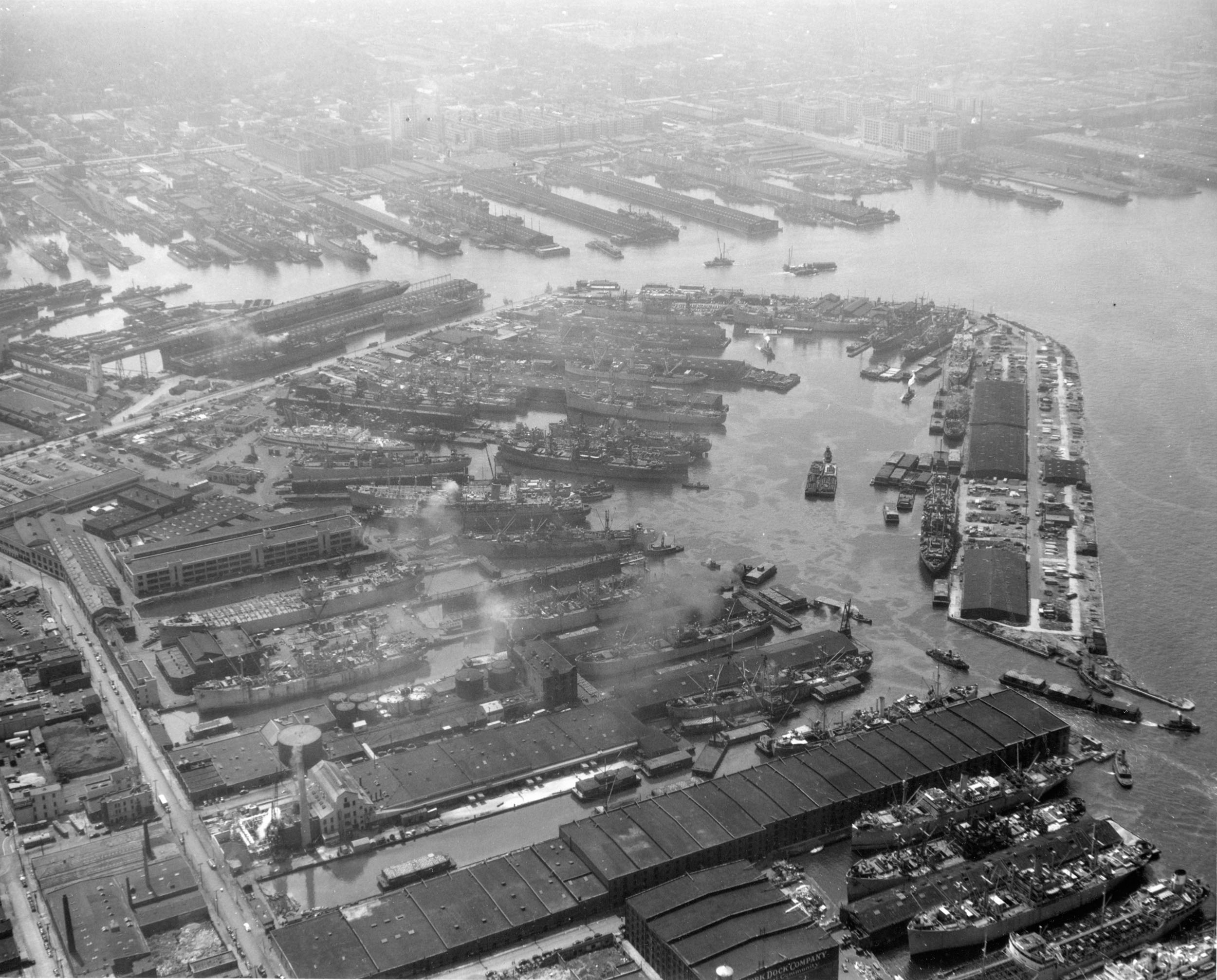
Todd-Erie 1945. The dry docks are on the left side/middle of the photo in front of the long 4-story building that has lots of windows. The dock closest to the building was later filled in, the next one over with the pointy end was filled in by IKEA in 2008. The outline of this dock can still be seen in satellite mapping photos.

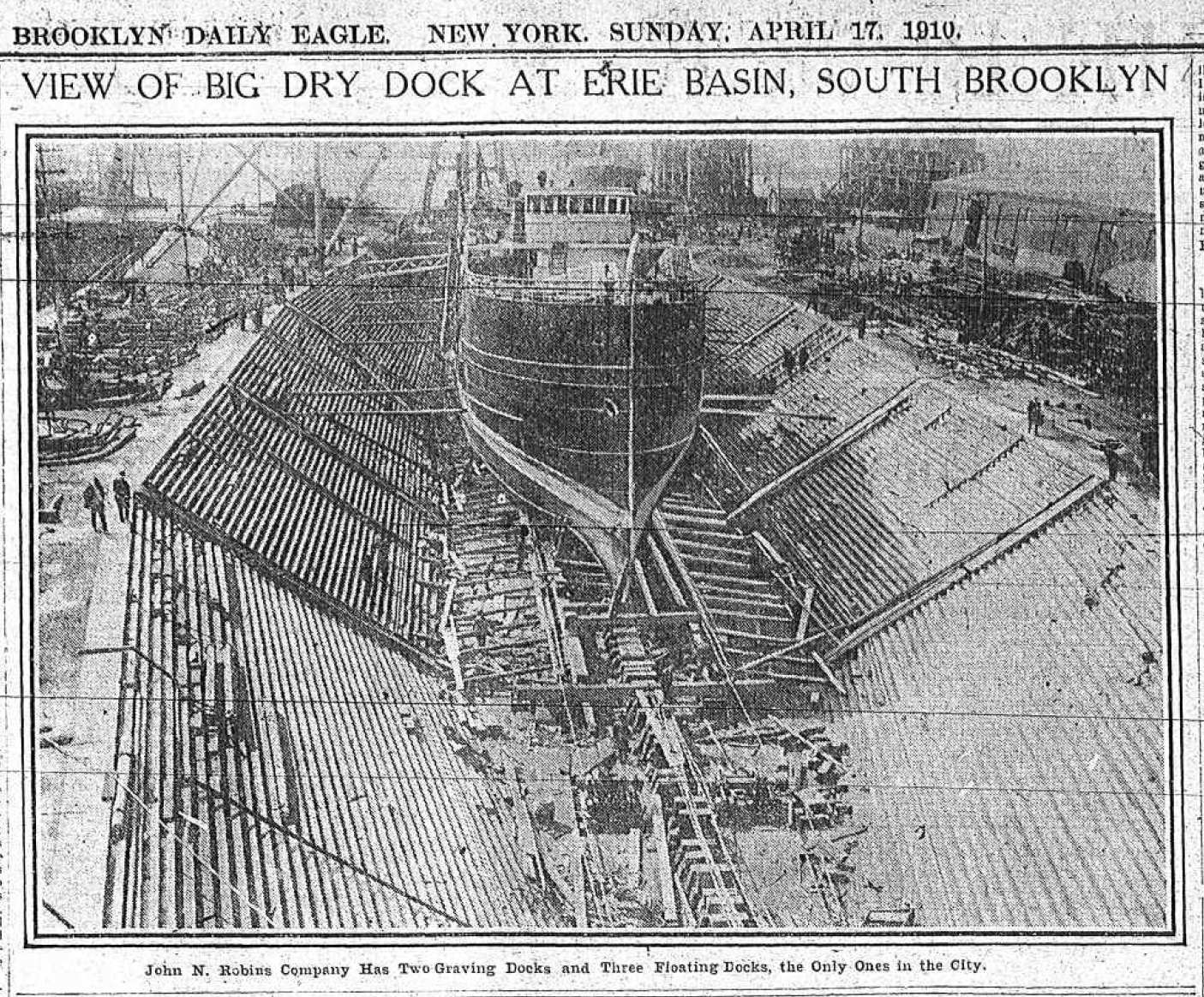

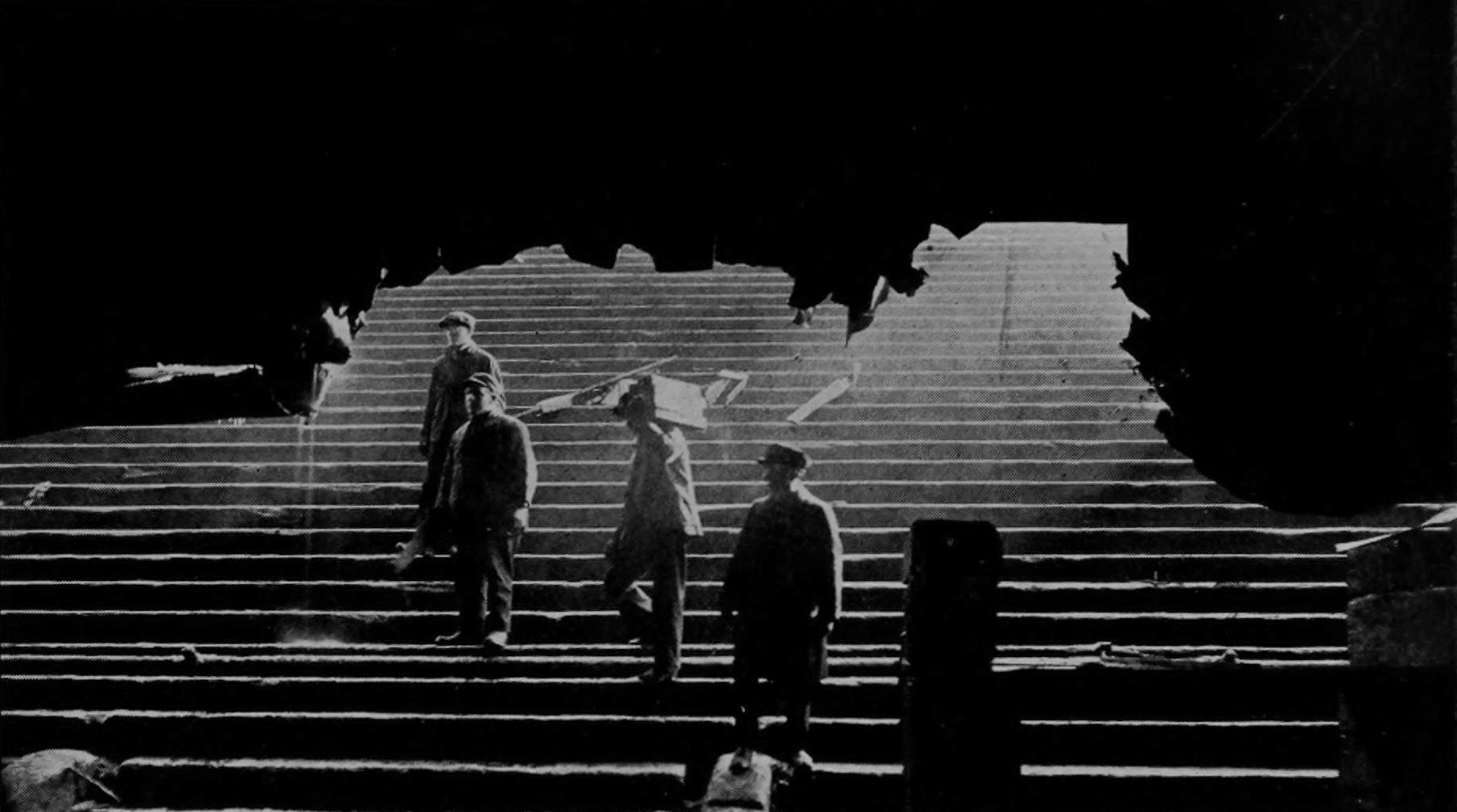
Tanker F. D. Asche in Robins Drydock of New York, looking through hole in hull, 1921

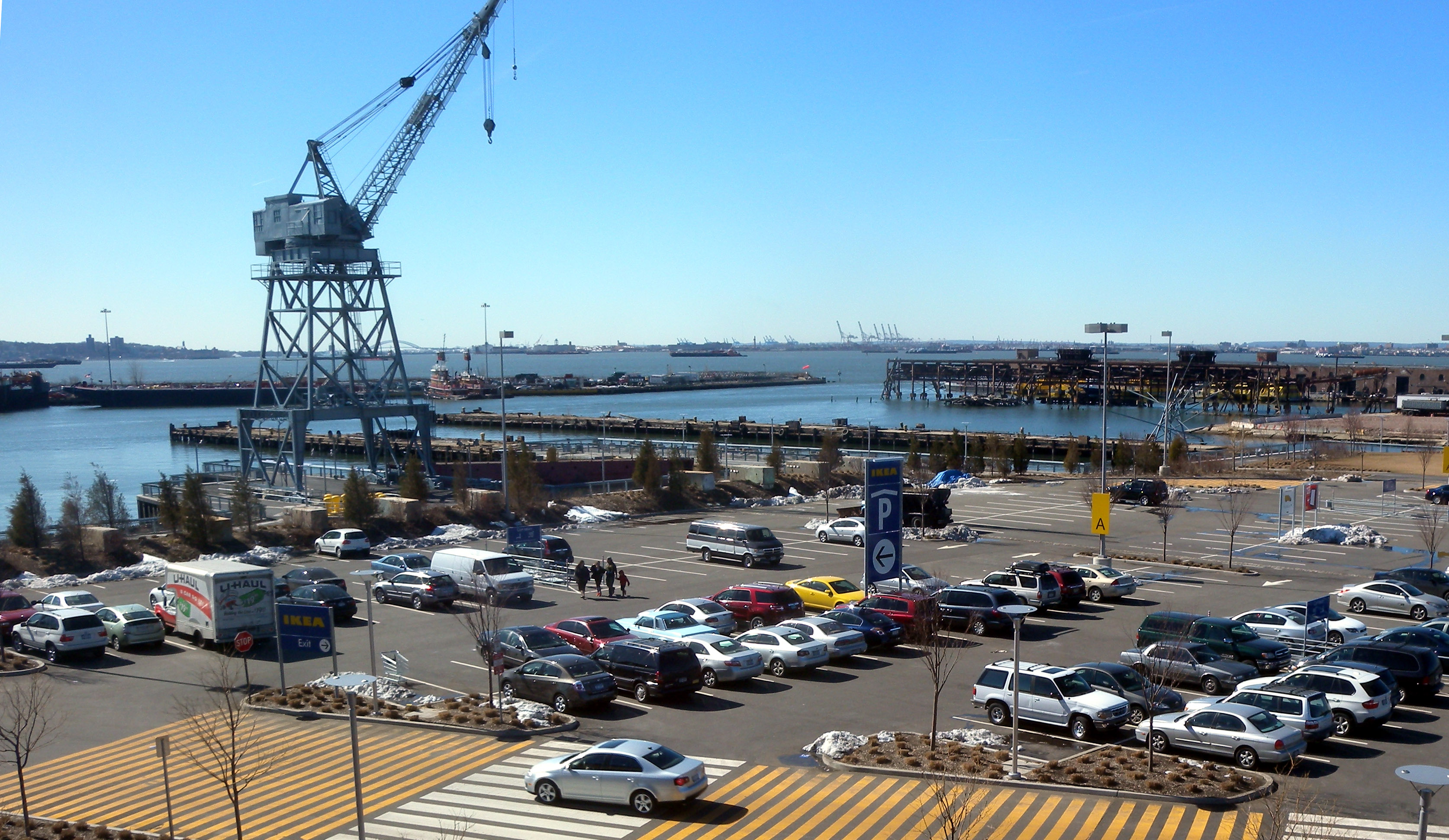
Former location with historic crane. Ikea bought the property and paved over the graving dock to make a parking lot. The pavers tracing the outline of the old dock are visible just beyond the island behind the "A" sign. Photo from inside Ikea.

Erie Basin dry dock (est. 1866) was a graving dock facility located at Erie Basin, in Red Hook, Brooklyn, New York City. There were at least two docks built, although only one remained into the 21st century. The dock contributed to making Red Hook the "center of the shipping industry in New York", and was part of Erie Basin's dry and shipping dock infrastructure, the largest in the city. It was the first graving dock in the United States.

The dock had a complicated corporate history with many name changes, but during its heyday it was best known as the Robins Dry Dock and Repair Company in the early part of the 20th century, and then later Todd Shipyards until 1986. The last dock was paved over in 2008, for an IKEA store parking lot.

== History ==
In 1864, William Beard and two associates of the Robins family purchased waterfront property in west Brooklyn. They built an artificially enclosed harbor with ship building and repair facilities lining the shore. They named the facility Erie Basin because it initially processed wheat floated down the Erie Canal on barges and ships. That same year, Beard sold a plot of land inside the Basin to the Anglo-American Dry Dock Company, who built the first solid or "graving" docks in the United States. It opened in October 1866 to much fanfare, although initially it had few customers. The largest dock was about 730-foot-long (220 m) and 117-foot-wide (36 m) at the rim.

Business picked up after the docks were acquired in 1869 by Handren and Robins Company. It was renamed John N. Robins Company in 1892, after Handren's death. In 1904, this company merged with the Erie Basin Dry Dock Company (started by DeLamater Iron Works) and was renamed Robins Dry Dock and Repair Company, the name by which the docks would be best known for the next half century.

William H. Todd had worked for both Erie Basin Dry Dock and Robins Dry Dock. In 1916, Todd and some of his associates purchased the Robins Dry Dock and Repair Company and other local and national dock facilities. The conglomerate, called the William H. Todd Corporation (later Todd Shipyards), ran the dock for 70 years, when it was sold in 1986 to Rodermond Industries, which closed in the 1990s. The docks were then leased to a succession of other companies. The last lease was held for 8 years, by Stevens Technical Services, ending in 2005.

=== IKEA controversy ===
Around the time of the lease's expiration, IKEA expressed their intent to purchase the property and turn it into a store parking lot. Local preservationists argued the dock had been created at the end of the American Civil War, and would be considered eligible for inclusion in the National Register of Historic Places. In 2006, a comptroller for the city also said that paving over the dock would be "premature". Efforts to salvage the property included protests and a lawsuit against the United States Army. These efforts were unsuccessful, and by 2008 the graving dock had been filled in and paved over. The outline of the graving dock was embedded in the parking lot with stone pavers, which are visible in person, or digital map satellite view.

=== Modern ===
A modern floating dry dock facility operates at Erie Basin, in a different location, for smaller vessels like barges and tugboats.

== Names ==
List of companies who did business at the docks (incomplete list):

- Anglo-American Dry Dock Company
- Handren and Robins Company
- John N. Robins Company
- Erie Basin Dry Dock Company
- Robins Dry Dock and Repair Company
- Todd-Erie Basin Dry Docks, Inc.
- Rodermond Industries
- Stevens Technical Services
