= List of shipwrecks in 1947 =

The list of shipwrecks in 1947 includes ships sunk, foundered, grounded, or otherwise lost during 1947.

table of contents
1947
Jan	Feb	Mar	Apr
May	Jun	Jul	Aug
Sep	Oct	Nov	Dec
Unknown date

== January ==
=== 1 January ===
List of shipwrecks: 1 January 1947
Ship	State	Description
Karla	Denmark	The cable laying ship struck a mine and sank in the Gulf of Finland, 15 nautical miles (28 km) of Ormus Island, Estonia. Sixteen of the 44 crew were killed.

=== 2 January ===
List of shipwrecks: 2 January 1947
Ship	State	Description
Caritas I	Belgium	The cargo ship broke in two and sank after being beached in the River Scheldt following a collision with Jan Steen (Netherlands) on 1 January.
Empire Wharfe	United Kingdom	The cargo ship arrived at Lagos, Nigeria on fire and was beached in Badagry Creek. Refloated on 6 January, repaired and returned to service.

=== 3 January ===
List of shipwrecks: 3 January 1947
Ship	State	Description
Magnhild	Norway	The cargo ship collided with Imba No. 401 (Soviet Union) whilst on a voyage from Kolding, Denmark to Gdynia, Poland.

=== 5 January ===
List of shipwrecks: 5 January 1947
Ship	State	Description
Lois	United Kingdom	The 130-foot (40 m), 286-ton trawler, a sold off (either a "Non-standard" Mersey-class, or Castle-class) anti-submarine naval trawler, was wrecked in a blizzard and mountainous seas at Grindavík, Iceland. She broke up, a total loss. Her captain was swept away and died.
Varvassi	Greece	The cargo ship ran aground off the Needles Lighthouse, Isle of Wight, United Kingdom.

=== 7 January ===
List of shipwrecks: 7 January 1947
Ship	State	Description
Pollnes	Norway	The cargo ship foundered off the Shetland Islands, United Kingdom whilst on a voyage from Bodø, Norway, to Dublin, Ireland. Thirteen crew killed.

=== 8 January ===
List of shipwrecks: 8 January 1947
Ship	State	Description
Senjen	Norway	The cargo ship ran aground west of the Kvaløy Lighthouse whilst on a voyage from Bangsund to Trondheim, Norway.

=== 11 January ===
List of shipwrecks: 11 January 1947
Ship	State	Description
Ewell	United Kingdom	The collier ran aground off Caister-on-Sea, Norfolk.

=== 12 January ===
List of shipwrecks: 12 January 1947
Ship	State	Description
Clarinda	United States	The 76 GRT, 89.6-foot (27.3 m) motor cargo vessel was destroyed by fire at Sand Point, Territory of Alaska.

=== 13 January ===
List of shipwrecks: 13 January 1947
Ship	State	Description
Good Shepherd	United Kingdom	The ship was driven ashore on Fair Isle and was a total loss.

=== 14 January ===
List of shipwrecks: 14 January 1947
Ship	State	Description
Astafjorden	Norway	The cargo ship sank west of Kvænangen Municipality whilst on a voyage from Tromsø to Hammerfest, Norway.
Simbra	United Kingdom	The whaler foundered in the Atlantic Ocean with the loss of all bar one of her sixteen crew.

=== 18 January ===
List of shipwrecks: 18 January 1947
Ship	State	Description
British Earl	United Kingdom	The tanker struck a mine in the Great Belt and was beached on Langeland, Denmark. She was on a voyage from Abadan, Iran to Stockholm, Sweden. She was refloated on 25 January and taken in tow for Nyborg, Denmark.

=== 19 January ===
List of shipwrecks: 19 January 1947
Ship	State	Description
Chihkiang	China	The passenger ship collided with a tug and sank at Shanghai with the loss of at least 100 lives.
Heimara	Greece	The ferry run aground and sank off Kavalliani in the South Euboean Gulf with the loss of about 300 lives.
Wanganella	Australia	Wanganella aground on Barrett Reef. The passenger ship ran aground on Barrett Reef at the entrance to Wellington Harbour, New Zealand. She was refloated 18 days later and repaired, and she returned to service in November 1948.

=== 20 January ===
List of shipwrecks: 20 January 1947
Ship	State	Description
Drexel Victory	United States	The Victory ship ran aground on the Peacock Spit, at the mouth of the Columbia River, Oregon. She was on a voyage from Astoria, Oregon to Yokohama, Japan. She was refloated, but consequently sank 5 nautical miles (9.3 km) off the Cape Disappointment Lighthouse.
Empire Grassland	Australia	The hopper ship foundered in the Pacific Ocean 70 nautical miles (130 km) north north west of Carnarvon, Western Australia whilst under tow from Singapore to Australia by Empire Downland (Australia).

=== 21 January ===
List of shipwrecks: 21 January 1947
Ship	State	Description
HMS Bonaventure	Royal Navy	The submarine tender ran aground at Cape Melville, Australia. Refloated on 23 January.

=== 23 January ===
List of shipwrecks: 23 January 1947
Ship	State	Description
Ampleforth	United Kingdom	The cargo ship was driven ashore in a storm at Tel Aviv, Palestine. She was on a voyage from Cardiff, Glamorgan to Haifa, Israel. Ampleforth was refloated on 3 March but declared a constructive total loss. She was repaired, sold and re-entered service in 1948 as Bangor Bay.

=== 25 January ===
List of shipwrecks: 25 January 1947
Ship	State	Description
British Earl	United Kingdom	The tanker ran aground at Sprogø, Denmark. She was being towed from Langeland to Nyborg. She was refloated and completed her voyage.
Storesand I	Norway	The cargo ship sank in the Drammensfjord whilst on a voyage from Gilhus to Oslo, Norway.

=== 26 January ===
List of shipwrecks: 26 January 1947
Ship	State	Description
Sten Sture	Sweden	The cargo ship (ex Sverre Nergaard) sank off of Bornholm while on a voyage from Gdańsk, Poland to Helsingborg, Sweden with the loss of 5 officers and 13 crew.

=== 27 January ===
List of shipwrecks: 27 January 1947
Ship	State	Description
Middlebury Victory	United States	The Victory ship ran aground on the Île de Planier, Bouches-du-Rhône, France. She was on a voyage from Haifa, Palestine to New York. The ship was abandoned on 3 February. She was declared a constructive total loss in October 1947.

=== 29 January ===
List of shipwrecks: 29 January 1947
Ship	State	Description
Samwater	United Kingdom	The Liberty ship caught fire and sank in the Atlantic Ocean (42°41′N 10°13′W).

=== 30 January ===
List of shipwrecks: 30 January 1947
Ship	State	Description
Star of Mex	Egypt	The cargo ship ran aground off Bahrain. The ship was attacked by Arab pirates on 15 February. All 28 crew rescued by British Destiny (United Kingdom).

=== Unknown date ===
List of shipwrecks: Unknown date January 1947
Ship	State	Description
Edwin C. Eckel	United States Army	The 360-foot (110 m), concrete-hulled cargo ship was damaged in a typhoon on 11 November 1946 and declared a constructive total loss. She was scuttled by the United States Army at an unknown location sometime in January.

== February ==
=== 2 February ===
List of shipwrecks: 2 February 1947
Ship	State	Description
Dora Oldendorff	Allied-occupied Germany	The cargo ship was scuttled in the Bay of Biscay (47°40′N 9°02′W) with a cargo of obsolete chemical ammunition.

=== 5 February ===
List of shipwrecks: 5 February 1947
Ship	State	Description
Winkleigh	United Kingdom	The cargo ship ran aground off the mouth of the Humber.

=== 8 February ===
List of shipwrecks: 8 February 1947
Ship	State	Description
Ary	Panama	The cargo ship was carrying coal from Port Talbot, Wales to Waterford, Ireland when the vessel foundered in the waters off County Waterford during the notoriously cold winter of 1946–1947. 15 of the 16 crew died (most of them Poles); many are buried at Ardmore Cathedral, Ireland.

=== 18 February ===
List of shipwrecks: 18 February 1947
Ship	State	Description
Arrow	United States Army	The United States Army transport, formerly the Colonial Navigation Company's Belfast (1909), wrecked off Ocean Park, Washington while under tow to Puget Sound.

=== 26 February ===
List of shipwrecks: 26 February 1947
Ship	State	Description
P T & B Co. 1651	United States	The 1,008 GRT barge was wrecked on Lewis Reef (55°22′30″N 131°44′15″W) in Tongass Narrows in Southeast Alaska near Ketchikan, Territory of Alaska.
Royal Oak	United States	The T2 tanker caught fire off Esmeraldos, Ecuador (1°04′N 80°03′W) and was abandoned by her crew. She was on a voyage from Talara, Peru to Buenaventura. She was later reboarded and the fire was extinguished. She was towed in to Balboa, Panama. Subsequently repaired and returned to service.
Royal Ulsterman	United Kingdom	The ferry ran aground at Clauchlands Point, Isle of Arran, Argyllshire. Refloated with the aid of the tug Vanguard (United Kingdom).
USS YON-163	United States Navy	The YOG-40 class fuel oil barge sank while being towed from Eniwetok to Kwajalein.
Zephyros	Greece	The cargo ship was driven ashore at Cullercoats, Northumberland, United Kingdom.
Zeprom	Greece	The cargo ship ran aground at Whitley Bay, Northumberland, United Kingdom. All 35 crew rescued.

== March ==
=== 3 March ===
List of shipwrecks: 3 March 1947
Ship	State	Description
Luana	Italy	The vessel struck a mine and sank 20 nautical miles (37 km) south of Capo Promontore, Yugoslavia.
Novadoc	Canada	Carrying a cargo of gypsum and a crew of 24, the 2,250 GRT cargo ship sent a distress signal reporting herself taking on water in the Atlantic Ocean 22 nautical miles (41 km) east of Portland, Maine, during a gale. She probably sank in over 400 feet (120 m) of water. An extensive search failed to find any trace of her or her crew.
Oakey L. Alexander	United States	Carrying a cargo of coal, the 5,284 GRT cargo ship broke in half in the Atlantic Ocean during a gale. Her bow section disappeared. Her stern section sank in up to 20 feet (6.1 m) of water just off Cape Elizabeth, Maine. Her entire crew survived.

=== 4 March ===
List of shipwrecks: 4 March 1947
Ship	State	Description
Bolivar	Norway	The cargo ship ran aground on the Kish Bank, Irish Sea whilst on a voyage from Dublin, Ireland to Liverpool, Lancashire, United Kingdom.

=== 6 March ===
List of shipwrecks: 6 March 1947
Ship	State	Description
Trondhjem	Norway	The cargo ship struck a mine in the Weser, West Germany and sank. She was on a voyage from Stavanger, Norway to Hamburg.

=== 8 March ===
List of shipwrecks: 8 March 1947
Ship	State	Description
Ira	Greece	The Liberty ship ran aground on the Goodwin Sands, Kent, United Kingdom and broke in two. All 34 crew rescued by the Walmer Lifeboat.

=== 9 March ===
List of shipwrecks: 9 March 1947
Ship	State	Description
Sondra Lee	United States	The 296 GRT, 99.1-foot (30.2 m) motor cargo vessel was destroyed by fire in Wrangell Narrows in the Alexander Archipelago in Southeast Alaska.

=== 12 March ===
List of shipwrecks: 12 March 1947
Ship	State	Description
Fort Dearborn	United States	The T2 tanker broke in two in the Pacific Ocean 800 nautical miles (1,500 km) north west of Honolulu, Hawaii. Ten crew on the bow section were rescued by General W. H. Gordon (United States). Twenty-two crew on the stern section were rescued by USS Eldorado (United States Navy). The bow section was shelled and sunk, the stern section was towed to Hawaii. Fort Dearborn was on a voyage from San Francisco, California to Shanghai, China.

=== 13 March ===
List of shipwrecks: 13 March 1947
Ship	State	Description
Edmund Fanning	United States	The Liberty ship exploded at Genoa Italy and was beached. She was later refloated but declared a constructive total loss and scrapped.
Empire Jonquil	United Kingdom	The cargo ship caught fire in the North Sea 20 nautical miles (37 km) north east of the Outer Dowsing Lightship ( Trinity House) and was abandoned by her crew. She was subsequently boarded by the crew of a fishing trawler and beached in the Humber, where the fire was extinguished. She was refloated and taken in to Hull Docks, where she sank. Empire Jonquil was declared a constructive total loss. She was later repaired and returned to service.

=== 19 March ===
List of shipwrecks: 19 March 1947
Ship	State	Description
Famagusta	United Kingdom	The former landing craft tank was abandoned in position 44°27'N 9°07'"W, 70 nautical miles (130 km) north northwest of A Coruña, Spain, in the Bay of Biscay, after taking water in a gale, and subsequently sank. She was on a voyage from London to Cyprus with a cargo of lorries. Eleven survivors were rescued by steamship Empire Plover (United Kingdom); the owner, his wife, and three others (one from Empire Plover) were drowned when a lifeboat capsized in heavy seas.
ROCS Fu Po	Republic of China Navy	The Flower-class corvette sank in a collision with the merchant ship Hai Ming (Republic of China) in the Formosa Strait.

=== 20 March ===
List of shipwrecks: 20 March 1947
Ship	State	Description
Alexandra	Greece	The cargo ship struck a mine in the North Sea (53°31′N 4°57′E) and was severely damaged. She was towed in to Zeebrugge, West Flanders, Belgium. She was consequently scrapped.

=== 21 March ===
List of shipwrecks: 21 March 1947
Ship	State	Description
HMCS Onyx	Royal Canadian Navy	The Admiralty-type drifter foundered.

=== 22 March ===
List of shipwrecks: 22 March 1947
Ship	State	Description
Empire Contamar	United Kingdom	The schooner ran aground in St Austell Bay. Seven crew rescued by the Fowey lifeboat. Refloated in June and declared a constructive total loss but rebuilt as a coaster and returned to service.

=== 24 March ===
List of shipwrecks: 24 March 1947
Ship	State	Description
Garnes	Norway	The cargo ship struck a mine north of Terschelling, Friesland, Netherlands. She was taken in tow but sank at (53°26′N 4°35′E). Garnes was on a voyage from Antwerp, Belgium to Emden, West Germany.

=== 25 March ===
List of shipwrecks: 25 March 1947
Ship	State	Description
St. Lawrence Victory	United States	The Victory ship struck a mine 8 nautical miles (15 km) off Dubrovnik, Yugoslavia and was beached off Korcula. Salvage was subsequently claimed by Yugoslav authorities and she was abandoned as a constructive total loss by the War Shipping Administration. Subsequently rebuilt and entered Yugoslav service as Zagreb

=== 26 March ===
List of shipwrecks: 26 March 1947
Ship	State	Description
Albert Kahn	United States	The 360-foot (110 m), concrete-hulled cargo ship was severely damaged in a typhoon at Saipan on 10 September 1946 and declared a constructive total loss on 9 October. She was scuttled by the United States Army at (13°24′N 144°15′E).

=== 27 March ===
List of shipwrecks: 27 March 1947
Ship	State	Description
USS Carmita	United States Navy	The Trefoil-class concrete barge was reported as sunk by the Ship Repair Facility, Manicani, near Samar, Philippines.

=== 28 March ===
List of shipwrecks: 28 March 1947
Ship	State	Description
Sevilla	Norway	The cargo ship collided with Clio (Norway) west of Bloksen and sank with the loss of ten crew. She was on a voyage from Bergen, Norway to Geneva, Switzerland.

=== 30 March ===
List of shipwrecks: 30 March 1947
Ship	State	Description
Titania	Norway	The cargo ship struck a mine off the Dutch coast (53°35′N 4°35′E) whilst on a voyage from Antwerp, Belgium to Oslo, Norway. Declared a constructive total loss and scrapped at Stavanger, Norway.

=== Unknown date ===
List of shipwrecks: Unknown March 1947
Ship	State	Description
Hrvatska	Yugoslavia	The Victory ship struck a naval mine in the Adriatic Sea near Dubrovnik and was beached to prevent sinking. Raised, repaired, and returned to service in 1949.
Kunitsu Maru	Imperial Japanese Navy	The Kamitsu-class transport, irreparably damaged when sunk during World War II, was scuttled off Singapore sometime in March.
USS LCT-746	United States Navy	The decommissioned Landing Craft, Tank was scuttled in the Pacific Ocean off Kwajalein, Marshall Islands, sometime in March after use as a target in the Operation Crossroads atomic bomb tests of 1946.

== April ==
=== 1 April ===
List of shipwrecks: 1 April 1947
Ship	State	Description
Freelock	United Kingdom	The cargo ship sank on this date.

=== 3 April ===
List of shipwrecks: 3 April 1947
Ship	State	Description
Stancliffe	United Kingdom	The collier ran aground at Sharpness, Gloucestershire. She was declared a constructive total loss but was later repaired and returned to service.

=== 4 April ===
List of shipwrecks: 4 April 1947
Ship	State	Description
USS Ernest G. Small	United States Navy	The Gearing-class destroyer ran aground off Block Island, Rhode Island.

=== 6 April ===
List of shipwrecks: 6 April 1947
Ship	State	Description
Hilary A. Herbert	United States	The Liberty ship ran aground in the Scheldt. She was on a voyage from the Hampton Roads, Virginia, to Antwerp. She was refloated on 13 April and towed in to Antwerp. Although declared a constructive total loss, she was subsequently sold, repaired and returned to service.

=== 12 April ===
List of shipwrecks: 12 April 1947
Ship	State	Description
Acacia	Sweden	The cargo ship struck a mine and sank off Falsterbo.

=== 13 April ===
List of shipwrecks: 13 April 1947
Ship	State	Description
Belpamela	Norway	The heavy-lift ship sank in a storm off Newfoundland. The ship's cargo included 16 locomotives for the French Railways.

=== 14 April ===
List of shipwrecks: 14 April 1947
Ship	State	Description
Queen Elizabeth	United Kingdom	The ocean liner ran aground on the Brambles Bank in the Solent. Refloated the next day.

=== 15 April ===
List of shipwrecks: 15 April 1947
Ship	State	Description
Georgie	Panama	The cargo ship ran aground at St Catherine's Point, Isle of Wight, United Kingdom.
Empire Passmore	United Kingdom	The coaster struck a mine off the Horsborough Lighthouse, Singapore and was severely damaged. She was on a voyage from Kuching, Malaya to Singapore. She was towed in to Singapore by Anhui (United Kingdom) Subsequently repaired and returned to service.
Nicolaos G Kulukundis	Greece	The cargo ship ran aground off Beachy Head, Sussex, United Kingdom.

=== 16 April ===
List of shipwrecks: 16 April 1947
Ship	State	Description
Grandcamp	France	Texas City disaster: The Liberty ship caught fire at Texas City, Texas, United States. She was obliterated by the explosion of her cargo of explosives. Around 580 people were killed.
Great Isaac	United States	While towing the Liberty ship Thomas M. Cooley (United States), the 1,117 GRT tug sank in 90 feet (27 m) of water off Barnegat Light, New Jersey, after colliding with the cargo ship Bandeirante (Norway) in dense fog. Bandeirante rescued her entire crew of 27.
Wilson B. Keene	United States	Wilson B. Keene Texas City disaster: The Liberty ship was sunk by the explosion of Grandcamp (France) at Texas City, Texas.

=== 18 April ===
List of shipwrecks: 18 April 1947
Ship	State	Description
Sir Harvey Adamson	United Kingdom	The 219.7 ft (67.0 m), 1,030 GRT British India Steam Navigation Company coastal steamship disappeared in the Andaman Sea en route from Rangoon to Tavoy, Burma. All 64 crew and 205 passengers were lost.

=== 23 April ===
List of shipwrecks: 23 April 1947
Ship	State	Description
Samtampa	United Kingdom	The Liberty ship was driven ashore at Sker Point, Glamorgan and broke in three. All 39 crew were lost, as well as all eight crew of the Mumbles lifeboat Edward, Prince of Wales ( Royal National Lifeboat Institution).
HMS Warspite	Royal Navy	The battleship ran aground at Prussia Cove after parting tow on final voyage from Portsmouth to the breakers yard on the Clyde. Towed to Marazion in 1950 and dismantled.

=== 24 April ===
List of shipwrecks: 24 April 1947
Ship	State	Description
Benghazi	United Kingdom	The trawler, a sold off Castle-class naval trawler, was driven aground in a gale on rocks off Eilean Dubh Beag (Little Black Isle), Firth of Lorne falling on her beams end. Twelve crewmen made it to shore in her boat, but one died of hypothermia after plugging a leak with his hand. The vessel later floated free but was driven ashore again on Fladda Island in Luing Sound. Of the four crew still on board one was washed away and the other three rescued by a lifeboat. Two days later another gale struck causing her to slip off the rocks and sink, a total loss.

=== 28 April ===
List of shipwrecks: 28 April 1947
Ship	State	Description
Merganser	United Kingdom	The ship collided with the Victory ship Norwalk Victory (United States) and sank in the River Scheldt between Doel and Liefkenshoek, Belgium with the loss of a crew member. Raised on 2 July and beached. Repaired between 1949 and 1951, sold and returned to service.

=== 29 April ===
List of shipwrecks: 29 April 1947
Ship	State	Description
HMS Witherington	Royal Navy	Under tow to the breaker's yard, the decommissioned Admiralty modified W-class destroyer parted her tow line in a gale and was wrecked on the northeast coast of England off the mouth of the River Tyne.

=== 30 April ===
List of shipwrecks: 30 April 1947
Ship	State	Description
Teniente Pratt Gill	Paraguay	Paraguayan Civil War: The transport was attacked by two aircraft and forced to run aground at Río Pilcomayo.

=== Unknown date ===
List of shipwrecks: Unknown date 1947
Ship	State	Description
San Nicolao	Panama	The cargo ship departed from the Tees on 2 April bound for Gibraltar. No further trace.

== May ==
=== 2 May ===
List of shipwrecks: 2 May 1947
Ship	State	Description
Wicklow Head	United Kingdom	The cargo ship ran aground near Port Mouton, Nova Scotia, Canada. All 30 crew were rescued by the fishing vessel Ray Richard (Canada). Wicklow Head was on a voyage from Ardrossan, Ayrshire to Saint John, New Brunswick, Canada. She was further damaged in storms between 8 and 12 June and was declared a constructive total loss.

=== 8 May ===
List of shipwrecks: 8 May 1947
Ship	State	Description
Muirchú	Irish Naval Service	The decommissioned patrol vessel sank in the Irish Sea off the Saltee Islands, County Wexford, Ireland, while under tow to a scrapyard.

=== 11 May ===
List of shipwrecks: 13 May 1947
Ship	State	Description
Stanhill	United Kingdom	The cargo ship ran aground at Cape Palmas, Liberia. She was on a voyage from Lagos, Nigeria to the Clyde. She was looted and set afire by the local inhabitants and was consequently declared a constructive total loss.

=== 13 May ===
List of shipwrecks: 13 May 1947
Ship	State	Description
Balena	United Kingdom	The whaler ran aground on the Shipwash Shoal, off the coast of Essex. Refloated but again ran aground.
SATS General Botha	South African Navy	The decommissioned accommodation ship was sunk as a target in False Bay off Simonstown, South Africa.

=== 14 May ===
List of shipwrecks: 14 May 1947
Ship	State	Description
Balena	United Kingdom	The whaler ran aground off Gorleston, Norfolk.

=== 17 May ===
List of shipwrecks: 17 May 1947
Ship	State	Description
USS Oklahoma	United States Navy	The decommissioned Nevada-class battleship sank under tow 540 nautical miles (1,000 km) off Pearl Harbor, Hawaii, while on her way to San Francisco, California, for scrapping.

=== 20 May ===
List of shipwrecks: 20 May 1947
Ship	State	Description
Kairyu Maru	Japan	The ship was sunk by a mine.

=== 22 May ===
List of shipwrecks: 22 May 1947
Ship	State	Description
USS Mallard	United States Navy	The decommissioned Lapwing-class minesweeper was sunk as a target by the submarine USS Piper (United States Navy).

=== 24 May ===
List of shipwrecks: 24 May 1947
Ship	State	Description
Newhall Hills	United States	The tanker collided with Monica (Sweden) off the Goodwin Sands, Kent, United Kingdom causing an explosion in No.2 tank and subsequent fire. Two hours later, an explosion blew off her bow forward of No.3 tank and that section sank. Newhall Hills was towed to Sheerness. She was repaired in February 1948 and returned to service.
Oceanic II	Belgium	The trawler was in collision with John la Farge (United States) and was cut in two. She sank with the loss of three of her five crew.

=== 25 May ===
List of shipwrecks: 25 May 1947
Ship	State	Description
Trader Horn	United Kingdom	The schooner foundered in the Caribbean with the loss of two of her five crew.

=== 31 May ===
List of shipwrecks: 31 May 1947
Ship	State	Description
Berlin	Germany	The former cruiser was scuttled in the Skagerrak to dispose of chemical weapons.

=== Unknown date ===
List of shipwrecks: unknown May 1947
Ship	State	Description
S. D. J.	United Kingdom	The 87.3-foot (26.6 m), 100-ton drifter failed to make daily contact on 12 May. Debris later found indicated she was sunk by a mine in the North Sea. Lost with all nine hands.

== June ==
=== 4 June ===
List of shipwrecks: 4 June 1947
Ship	State	Description
Emperor	Canada	The cargo ship struck a rock and sank of Isle Royale, Lake Superior with the loss of twelve of her 33 crew. The survivors were rescued by USCGC Kimball (United States Coast Guard).

=== 6 June ===
List of shipwrecks: 6 June 1947
Ship	State	Description
HMS LCT 1068	Royal Navy	The landing craft tank was lost on this date.

=== 11 June ===
List of shipwrecks: 11 June 1947
Ship	State	Description
Loch Hope	United Kingdom	The 125.4-foot (38.2 m), 273.94-ton trawler was sunk by a mine that came up in her nets off the east coast of Iceland. One person was killed, and the 17 survivors, of whom 8 were wounded, were rescued by Urka (United Kingdom).

=== 12 June ===
List of shipwrecks: 12 June 1947
Ship	State	Description
Ford Dearborn	United States	The T2 tanker broke in two in the Pacific Ocean 800 nautical miles (1,500 km) north west of Honolulu, Hawaii (36°00′N 168°00′W). She was on a voyage from San Francisco, California to Shanghai, China. The bow was sunk by United States Navy gunfire. The stern section was towed to Honolulu. Declared a constructive total loss, it was used as a floating power plant for four years before being scrapped.

=== 14 June ===
List of shipwrecks: 14 June 1947
Ship	State	Description
Winifred	United States	The 13 GRT, 37-foot (11 m) fishing vessel was destroyed by fire at Uganik, Territory of Alaska.

=== 21 June ===
List of shipwrecks: 21 June 1947
Ship	State	Description
Cape Karluk	United States	The 15 GRT, 32.6-foot (9.9 m) fishing vessel was destroyed by fire off Kumlik Island (56°38′N 157°24′W) on the south coast of the Alaska Peninsula in the Territory of Alaska.

=== 22 June ===
List of shipwrecks: 22 June 1947
Ship	State	Description
Fairplay II	United Kingdom	Fairplay II The tug capsized and sank off Vlissingen, Zeeland, Netherlands whilst towing Kuurtanes (Netherlands). Fairplay II was refloated on 13 August. Although declared a constructive total loss, she was repaired and returned to service.

=== 28 June ===
List of shipwrecks: 28 June 1947
Ship	State	Description
Heron	Greece	The cargo ship collided with Stal (Denmark) in the English Channel off Folkestone, Kent, United Kingdom and sank with the loss of one of her 24 crew. The survivors were rescued by Suavity (United Kingdom).

=== Unknown date ===
List of shipwrecks: Unknown date 1947
Ship	State	Description
USS LCT-816	United States Navy	The decommissioned Landing Craft, Tank was sunk in the Pacific Ocean off Kwajalein, Marshall Islands, sometime in June after use as a target in the Operation Crossroads atomic bomb tests of 1946.
Old Ocean	United States	The T1 tanker sank whilst laid up at San Francisco, California. Although salvaged, she was declared not worthy of repair and was scrapped in 1951.
Ourang Medan	Netherlands	The ghost ship allegedly exploded and sank after its crew died under suspicious circumstances.

== July ==
=== 1 July ===
List of shipwrecks: 1 July 1947
Ship	State	Description
Panigaglia	Italy	The ship exploded at Santo Stefano, Sardinia, killing 68 people.

=== 3 July ===
List of shipwrecks: 3 July 1947
Ship	State	Description
Kronholm	Norway	The former minesweeper was destroyed by fire at the Soon shipyard.

=== 4 July ===
List of shipwrecks: 4 July 1947
Ship	State	Description
M. Xilas	Greece	The Design 1022 ship caught fire at Ko Sichang, Thailand. She was beached and abandoned, and sank on 13 July.

=== 11 July ===
List of shipwrecks: 11 July 1947
Ship	State	Description
ARP Humaitá	Paraguayan Navy (Revolutionary)	Paraguayan Civil War: The Humaitá-class gunboat, under control of Revolutionaries, was bombed and damaged by government North American T-6 Texan aircraft and forced to run aground off Ituzaingó. Refloated 13 August.

=== 13 July ===
List of shipwrecks: 13 July 1947
Ship	State	Description
Rainbow III	United States	The 139 GRT, 100.3-foot (30.6 m) fishing vessel was wrecked in Marmot Bay (58.0644°N 152.2544°W) on Afognak Island in the Kodiak Archipelago near Afognak, Territory of Alaska.

=== 17 July ===
List of shipwrecks: 17 July 1947
Ship	State	Description
Empire Lark	United Kingdom	The cargo ship was scuttled in the Atlantic Ocean (47°55′N 8°25′W) with a cargo of obsolete chemical bombs and contaminated soil.
Ramdas	India	The coastal passenger ship sank 10 nautical miles (19 km) off Bombay with the loss of around 600 lives.

=== 18 July ===
List of shipwrecks: 18 July 1947
Ship	State	Description
Avis	United States	The 8 GRT, 31-foot (9.4 m) fishing vessel sank in Cross Sound in the Alexander Archipelago in Southeast Alaska.

=== 19 July ===
List of shipwrecks: 19 July 1947
Ship	State	Description
Hong Kheng	United Kingdom	The passenger ship ran aground at Chilang Point, Hong Kong. All on board, more than 1,800 people, were rescued. She was on a voyage from Rangoon, Burma to Amoy, China. She was a total loss.

=== 21 July ===
List of shipwrecks: 21 July 1947
Ship	State	Description
Nascopie	Canada	The steamer was wrecked near Cape Dorset near the southern tip of Canada's Baffin Island.

=== 22 July ===
List of shipwrecks: 22 July 1947
Ship	State	Description
Lützow	Kriegsmarine	World War II: The captured Deutschland-class cruiser was sunk by the Soviet Union in the Baltic Sea off Świnoujście, Poland, during weapons testing.

=== 23 July ===
List of shipwrecks: 23 July 1947
Ship	State	Description
Empire Lifeguard	United Kingdom	The cargo ship was sunk at Haifa, Palestine by limpet mines which had been placed on her hull whilst at Famagusta, Cyprus. Refloated on 8 August, subsequently repaired and returned to service.

=== 28 July ===
List of shipwrecks: 28 July 1947
Ship	State	Description
Ocean Liberty	Norway	The Liberty ship caught fire at Brest, France whilst unloading a cargo of ammonium nitrate. Later towed out of port. Attempts by the French Navy to scuttle her failed. She exploded and was obliterated apart from her stern.

=== 31 July ===
List of shipwrecks: 31 July 1947
Ship	State	Description
USS Chewink	United States Navy	The decommissioned Lapwing-class minesweeper was sunk as a target in Long Island Sound off New London, Connecticut.

=== Unknown date ===
List of shipwrecks: Unknown date in July 1947
Ship	State	Description
ROCS Heyong	Republic of China Navy	Chinese Civil War: The landing craft tank ran aground and was stranded in a river in Jiangsu Province. Captured and put in Communist Chinese service.
Kapsul	Soviet Navy	The patrol vessel ran aground. She was refloated in July 1948.
Leighton	United Kingdom	The cargo ship was scuttled in the Atlantic Ocean with a cargo of obsolete chemical ammunition.

== August ==
=== 1 August ===
List of shipwrecks: 1 August 1947
Ship	State	Description
Unknown cargo ship	Paraguay (Revolutionary)	Paraguayan Civil War: The twin-masted river cargo ship was bombed by government aircraft at Puerto Ybapobó, causing her cargo of ammo and explosives to explode.

=== 8 August ===
List of shipwrecks: 8 August 1947
Ship	State	Description
Ole II	United States	The 8 GRT, 31.9-foot (9.7 m) fishing vessel was destroyed by fire in Union Bay in the Alexander Archipelago in Southeast Alaska.

=== 9 August ===
List of shipwrecks: 9 August 1947
Ship	State	Description
Leighton	United Kingdom	The cargo ship was scuttled with an obsolete cargo of ammunition, 100 nautical miles (190 km) northwest of Malin Head (56°22′N 9°27′W).

=== 11 August ===
List of shipwrecks: 11 August 1947
Ship	State	Description
Gravina Point	United States	The 59 GRT, 71.6-foot (21.8 m) fishing vessel was destroyed by fire at Cordova, Territory of Alaska.

=== 11 August ===
List of shipwrecks: 11 August 1947
Ship	State	Description
Red Gauntlet	United Kingdom	The 154.6-foot (47.1 m), 422-ton trawler, a sold off Tree-class trawler/minesweeping trawler, was wrecked on a reef at South Cape, Spitzbergen. All 22 hands rescued by Northern Spray (United Kingdom).

=== 15 August ===
List of shipwrecks: 15 August 1947
Ship	State	Description
Helium BCL 3051	United States	The 265-foot (81 m), B5-BJ1-class concrete-hulled barge dragged her anchor in heavy seas and stranded on a reef at Waikiki, Hawaii (21°16′N 157°50′W). The wreck was dispersed with explosives in July 1948 after attempts to refloat her failed.

=== 16 August ===
List of shipwrecks: 16 August 1947
Ship	State	Description
Graf Zeppelin	Kriegsmarine	World War II: The captured, incomplete Graf Zeppelin-class aircraft carrier was sunk by the Soviet Union in the Baltic Sea off Świnoujście, Poland, during weapons testing.

=== 18 August ===
List of shipwrecks: 18 August 1947
Ship	State	Description
Rovena	Norway	Wrecked off Langanes, Iceland.

=== 20 August ===
List of shipwrecks: 20 August 1947
Ship	State	Description
Mayo	United States	The 23 GRT, 42.9-foot (13.1 m) fishing vessel sank 1 nautical mile (1.9 km) off Ninilchik Light (60°03′N 151°40′W) near Ninilchik, Territory of Alaska.

=== 21 August ===
List of shipwrecks: 21 August 1947
Ship	State	Description
Empire John	United Kingdom	The Larch-class tug struck a mine off Kiel, Allied-occupied Germany. She was towing a corvette from Harwich, Essex to Copenhagen, Denmark. She put in to Kiel. Subsequently repaired and returned to service.
VAS 234	Regia Marina	The VAS 231-class submarine chaser burned at Vinice.

=== 25 August ===
List of shipwrecks: 25 August 1947
Ship	State	Description
USS S-24	United States Navy	The decommissioned S-class submarine was sunk for use as a sonar target in the Pacific Ocean off Portland, Oregon.

=== Unknown date ===
List of shipwrecks: Unknown date August 1947
Ship	State	Description
Unidentified MAS boat	Regia Marina	The captured MAS boat was sunk by explosives off Marsaxlokk, Malta. Five other MAS boats were scuttled in open seas.

== September ==
=== 3 September ===
List of shipwrecks: 3 September 1947
Ship	State	Description
Tidings	United States	The 17 GRT, 40.5-foot (12.3 m) fishing vessel ran aground and sank off Soapstone Point (58°06′10″N 136°29′50″W) in Cross Sound in the Alexander Archipelago in Southeast Alaska.

=== 6 September ===
List of shipwrecks: 6 September 1947
Ship	State	Description
Matagalpa	United States Army	The fire-damaged fast transport, a former Clemson-class destroyer, was scuttled off Sydney, New South Wales, Australia.

=== 8 September ===
List of shipwrecks: 8 September 1947
Ship	State	Description
Norfisk	Norway	The cargo ship was abandoned whilst on a voyage from Aalborg, Denmark to Tórshavn, the Faroe Islands.
RFA Thorpebay	Royal Fleet Auxiliary	The cargo ship was scuttled in the Atlantic Ocean (47°47′03″N 8°21′00″W) with a cargo of obsolete chemical ammunition.

=== 9 September ===
List of shipwrecks: 9 September 1947
Ship	State	Description
Goma	Norway	The cargo ship sank north of the Tylön Lightship whilst on a voyage from Aalborg, Denmark to Gdańsk, Poland.
Thomas Altoft	United Kingdom	The sold off Castle-class trawler was wrecked on the rocks off Glas Island, Scalpay, Harris, a constructive total loss. All 14 hands rescued by Flanders (United Kingdom). The skipper of Flanders was awarded an inscribed silver bowl for the feat of seamanship in the rescue.

=== 13 September ===
List of shipwrecks: 13 September 1947
Ship	State	Description
HMAS Warrnambool	Royal Australian Navy	HMAS Warrnambool sinking. The Bathurst-class corvette sank near Cockburn Reef along the Great Barrier Reef off the northern coast of Queensland, Australia, after striking a mine. Four of her crew were killed and 29 were injured.

=== 15 September ===
List of shipwrecks: 15 September 1947
Ship	State	Description
Rolfsøy	Norway	The cargo ship ran aground off Egersund whilst on a voyage from Fredrikstad to Harstad, Norway.

=== 16 September ===
List of shipwrecks: 16 September 1947
Ship	State	Description
Sunset	Norway	The cargo ship sank off the coast of Norway whilst on a voyage from Raufarhafn to Åkrehamn.

=== 28 September ===
List of shipwrecks: 28 September 1947
Ship	State	Description
USS LCI(L)-332	United States Navy	The decommissioned Landing Craft, Infantry was scuttled in the Pacific Ocean off Kwajalein Atoll, Marshall Islands after use as a target in the Operation Crossroads atomic bomb tests.

=== 29 September ===
List of shipwrecks: 29 September 1947
Ship	State	Description
USS Douglas H. Fox	United States Navy	The Allen M. Sumner-class destroyer struck a mine and was damaged in the Adriatic Sea 18 nautical miles (33 km) off Trieste, Italy. Three of her crew were killed.

=== Unknown September ===
List of shipwrecks: Unknown September 1947
Ship	State	Description
USS LCT-412	United States Navy	The decommissioned Landing Craft, Tank was scuttled in the Pacific Ocean off Kwajalein Atoll, Marshall Islands, sometime in September after use as a target in the Operation Crossroads atomic bomb tests of 1946.
USS LCT-705	United States Navy	The decommissioned Landing Craft, Tank was scuttled in the Pacific Ocean off Kwajalein Atoll, Marshall Islands, sometime in September after use as a target in the Operation Crossroads atomic bomb tests of 1946.
USS LCT-818	United States Navy	The decommissioned Landing Craft, Tank was scuttled in the Pacific Ocean off Kwajalein Atoll, Marshall Islands, sometime in September after use as a target in the Operation Crossroads atomic bomb tests of 1946.
USS LCT-874	United States Navy	The decommissioned Landing Craft, Tank was scuttled in the Pacific Ocean off Kwajalein Atoll, Marshall Islands, sometime in September after use as a target in the Operation Crossroads atomic bomb tests of 1946.
USS LCT-1013	United States Navy	The decommissioned Landing Craft, Tank was scuttled in the Pacific Ocean off Kwajalein Atoll, Marshall Islands, sometime in September after use as a target in the Operation Crossroads atomic bomb tests of 1946.
USS LCT-1078	United States Navy	The decommissioned Landing Craft, Tank was scuttled in the Pacific Ocean off Kwajalein Atoll, Marshall Islands, sometime in September after use as a target in the Operation Crossroads atomic bomb tests of 1946.
USS LCT-1112	United States Navy	The decommissioned Landing Craft, Tank was scuttled in the Pacific Ocean off Kwajalein Atoll, Marshall Islands, sometime in September after use as a target in the Operation Crossroads atomic bomb tests of 1946.
USS LCT-1113	United States Navy	The decommissioned Landing Craft, Tank was scuttled in the Pacific Ocean off Kwajalein Atoll, Marshall Islands, sometime in September after use as a target in the Operation Crossroads atomic bomb tests of 1946.

== October ==
=== 2 October ===
List of shipwrecks: 2 October 1947
Ship	State	Description
Reine II	Norway	The cargo ship sank off Halmstad, Sweden, with the loss of all five crew. She was on a voyage for Halmstad to Oslo, Norway, and may have struck a mine.

=== 4 October ===
List of shipwrecks: 4 October 1947
Ship	State	Description
Troll	Norway	The cargo ship collided in the Øresund with the DFDS ship Jolantha (Denmark) and sank. Raised on 22 January 1948 and repaired at Copenhagen, Denmark. Returned to service as Bandak.

=== 6 October ===
List of shipwrecks: 6 October 1947
Ship	State	Description
Advance	United States	The 17 GRT, 40-foot (12.2 m) motor vessel was destroyed by fire on a beach on Gravina Island in the Alexander Archipelago in Southeast Alaska between Rosa Reef (55.4128°N 131.8028°W) and Channel Island (55°26′48″N 131°52′45″W).
USS Crittenden	United States Navy	The decommissioned Gilliam-class attack transport was sunk in an explosives test in the Pacific Ocean off the Farallon Islands.

=== 7 October ===
List of shipwrecks: 7 October 1947
Ship	State	Description
Betty Hindley	United Kingdom	The coaster struck a mine off Scarborough, Yorkshire and broke her back. She was beached sinking by the bows. One crewmember was killed. Betty Hindley was on a voyage from London to the River Tyne. She was a total loss.
Bro	Norway	The cargo ship ran aground off the coast of Iceland whilst on a voyage from Sandur, Faroe Islands to Reykjavík, Iceland.

=== 11 October ===
List of shipwrecks: 11 October 1947
Ship	State	Description
Gulfstream	Canada	The ferry was wrecked off Powell River, British Columbia.

=== 15 October ===
List of shipwrecks: 15 October 1947
Ship	State	Description
HMS Gillstone	Norway	The Isles-class trawler was driven ashore at Kvalbeinsrumen, Jæren, Norway whilst on a voyage from Bergen to Risør for conversion to a merchant ship. Later refloated and returned to Bergen.

=== 16 October ===
List of shipwrecks: 16 October 1947
Ship	State	Description
Auk	United States	The 28 GRT, 60.2-foot (18.3 m) tug was wrecked at the mouth of the Ugashik River on the south-central coast of the Territory of Alaska.

=== 18 October ===
List of shipwrecks: 18 October 1947
Ship	State	Description
Alannah	United States	The 41 GRT, 51.1-foot (15.6 m) fishing vessel was wrecked off Cape Fox Island (54°45′50″N 130°51′00″W) in Dixon Entrance in Southeast Alaska.

=== 19 October ===
List of shipwrecks: 19 October 1947
Ship	State	Description
Corona	Norway	The cargo ship, which had been refloated two days earlier having sunk on 24 February 1943, sank in the Mediterranean Sea whilst under tow 20 nautical miles (37 km) north of Derna, Libya.

=== 21 October ===
List of shipwrecks: 21 October 1947
Ship	State	Description
Oda	Norway	The cargo ship capsized and sank at Puerto Cabezas, Nicaragua whilst being loaded with a cargo of timber bound for Maracaibo, Venezuela.
U-190	Royal Canadian Navy	The Type IXC/40 submarine was sunk as a target in the Atlantic Ocean by Avro Anson, Fairey Firefly, Fairey Swordfish and Supermarine Seafire aircraft of the Royal Canadian Air Force and by HMCS Haida, HMCS New Liskeard and HMCS Nootka (all Royal Canadian Navy).

=== 30 October ===
List of shipwrecks: 31 October 1947
Ship	State	Description
USS LCI(L)-327	United States Navy	The decommissioned Landing Craft, Infantry was destroyed at Bascombe Island (Meck Island), Kwajalein, Marshall Islands after use as a target in the Operation Crossroads atomic bomb tests.
Matrona	United Kingdom	The passenger ship capsized at Birkenhead, Cheshire. Righted in June 1949, she was declared a constructive total loss and scrapped.

=== 31 October ===
List of shipwrecks: 31 October 1947
Ship	State	Description
Dolly	Norway	The cargo ship sank off Mariager whilst on a voyage from Mariager to Isefjord, Denmark.

== November ==
=== 1 November ===
List of shipwrecks: 1 November 1947
Ship	State	Description
Tilla	Norway	The cargo ship sank off Fosnes Municipality whilst on a voyage from Randers to Fredrikstad, Norway.

=== 2 November ===
List of shipwrecks: 2 November 1947
Ship	State	Description
Castillo Montjuich	Spain	The vessel broke moorings, collided with another ship and was driven ashore at Gijón, France. The ship was refloated in March 1948, repaired and returned to service.

=== 3 November ===
List of shipwrecks: 3 November 1947
Ship	State	Description
Mona	Norway	The sailing barge sank off Lille Marnet whilst on a voyage from Horsens to Slemmestad, Norway.

=== 6 November ===
List of shipwrecks: 6 November 1947
Ship	State	Description
Aurora	United States	The 19 GRT, 43.1-foot (13.1 m) motor vessel sank in Lisianski Inlet (58°07′30″N 136°27′30″W) in Southeast Alaska.

=== 11 November ===
List of shipwrecks: 11 November 1947
Ship	State	Description
Aqueity	United Kingdom	The coastal tanker struck a mine and sank off Terschelling, Friesland, Netherlands. She was on a voyage from Bremen, Allied-occupied Germany to Bromborough, Cheshire.

=== 20 November ===
List of shipwrecks: 20 November 1947
Ship	State	Description
Roald Amundsen	Norway	The Liberty ship ran aground at Skudeneshavn whilst on a voyage from Antwerp, Belgium to Narvik, Norway. Broke into three on 15 January 1948, with two sections sinking. The remaining section was scrapped in situ during the summer of 1948.
U-234	United States Navy	U-234 The Type X submarine was sunk as a torpedo target in the Atlantic Ocean off the United States East Coast by the submarine USS Greenfish (United States Navy).
U-889	United States Navy	The Type IXC/40 submarine was scuttled in the Atlantic Ocean off the east coast of the United States by USS Flying Fish (United States Navy).

=== 21 November ===
List of shipwrecks: 21 November 1947
Ship	State	Description
Havøy I	Norway	The cargo ship sank off Lillesand after striking flotsam whilst on a voyage from Oslo to Bergen, Norway.
U-858	United States Navy	The Type IXC/40 submarine was scuttled in the Atlantic Ocean off the United States East Coast by the submarine USS Sirago (United States Navy).

=== 22 November ===
List of shipwrecks: 22 November 1947
Ship	State	Description
North Pass	United States	The 32 GRT, 46.6-foot (14.2 m) fishing vessel was destroyed by fire in Southeast Alaska 1.1 nautical miles (2.0 km) north-northeast of Rocky Island Light and 0.5 nautical miles (0.93 km) from Point Couverden (58°11′25″N 135°03′10″W) on the southeastern tip of Couverden Island.

=== 24 November ===
List of shipwrecks: 24 November 1947
Ship	State	Description
USAT Clarksdale Victory	United States Army	The Victory ship was wrecked at Hippa Reef Island, British Columbia, Canada, with the loss of 49 of her 53 crew.
Sunbird	United Kingdom	The tug capsized and sank in the River Thames at Limehouse Reach, London with the loss of two of her six crew.
Vaagar	Norway	The cargo ship ran aground off Gothenburg, Sweden whilst on a voyage from Menstad, Norway to Hälsingborg, Sweden.

=== 25 November ===
List of shipwrecks: 25 November 1947
Ship	State	Description
John E. Schmeltzer	United States	The Liberty ship was driven ashore and wrecked on Santo Antão, Cape Verde whilst on a voyage from Rosario, Argentina to Gothenburg, Sweden.

=== 27 November ===
List of shipwrecks: 27 November 1947
Ship	State	Description
President Reitz	Union of South Africa	The Liberty ship was driven ashore 5 nautical miles (9.3 km) east of the Zitzihamma River. She was on a voyage from Table Bay to Durban. She was declared a constructive total loss.

=== 28 November ===
List of shipwrecks: 28 November 1947
Ship	State	Description
U-530	United States Navy	The Type IXC/40 submarine was scuttled in the Atlantic Ocean north east of Cape Cod, Massachusetts.

=== 30 November ===
List of shipwrecks: 30 November 1947
Ship	State	Description
Stenberg	Norway	The cargo ship ran aground at Tromøya with the loss of three crew. She was on a voyage from Skjebergkilen to Kristiansand, Norway.
Oval	Norway	The converted Portuguese-class naval trawler sank off Trelleborg whilst on a voyage from Stettin, Poland to Bergen, Norway.
Sonny Boy	Belgium	The fishing boat was sunk in a collision with the Victory ship Vinkt (Belgium in the English Channel 7 nautical miles (13 km) off Dungeness, Kent, United Kingdom with the loss of one of her six crew. The survivors were rescued by Vinkt.

=== Unknown date ===
List of shipwrecks: Unknown date
Ship	State	Description
C-6	Spanish Navy	After being refloated, the wreck of the C-class submarine sank again while under tow off Gijón, Spain.

== December ==
=== 1 December ===
List of shipwrecks: 1 December 1947
Ship	State	Description
Castillo Coca	Spain	The cargo ship ran aground at the mouth of the Ferrol and was wrecked with the loss of 46 of her 50 crew.
Sonny Boy	Belgium	The trawler was in collision with the cargo ship Vinkt and sank 6 nautical miles (11 km) west of Dungeness, England.

=== 9 December ===
List of shipwrecks: 9 December 1947
Ship	State	Description
USS Ponaganset	United States Navy	The Suamico-class fleet replenishment oiler broke in two at Boston, Massachusetts. Not repaired, scrapped in 1949.

=== 12 December ===
List of shipwrecks: 12 December 1947
Ship	State	Description
Dhoon	United Kingdom	The 137.1-foot (41.8 m), 323-ton trawler was wrecked at Latrabjarg, Iceland. Four crew killed.
Jerry S	United States	The 41-foot (12.5 m) troller departed Sitka, Territory of Alaska, bound for Red Bluff Bay (56.8631°N 134.7738°W) in Southeast Alaska. The vessel disappeared with the loss of all three men on board. Wreckage from Jerry S was discovered near Peschani Point (57.5367°N 135.3231°W) in Southeast Alaska on 16 March 1948.

=== 18 December ===
List of shipwrecks: 18 December 1947
Ship	State	Description
BO-302	Soviet Navy	The BO-201-class submarine chaser was wrecked on this date.
Francis P. Duke	Newfoundland	The schooner Francis P. Duke was lost at sea and the wreckage drifted ashore on the north side of Bonavista Bay, Newfoundland. The schooner had been driven ashore by the southeast gale. All crew perished in the incident.

=== 20 December ===
List of shipwrecks: 20 December 1947
Ship	State	Description
Kallipoi	Greece	The Liberty ship struck a mine, broke in three and sank off Rijeka, Yugoslavia. She was on a voyage from Charleston, South Carolina, United States to Rijeka.

=== 24 December ===
List of shipwrecks: 24 December 1947
Ship	State	Description
Park Victory	United States	The Victory ship was driven onto a reef 2 nautical miles (3.7 km) off Utö, Finland (59°46′N 21°24′E). She was on a voyage from the Hampton Roads, Virginia to a Finnish port. She subsequently capsized and was a total loss.
Skoghaug	Norway	The cargo ship sank off the Dutch coast with the loss of all 26 crew after hitting a mine. She was on a voyage from Rotterdam, Netherlands to Oslo, Norway.

=== 26 December ===
List of shipwrecks: 26 December 1947
Ship	State	Description
Kina	Denmark	The cargo liner ran aground on Samandag Island, Philippines and was wrecked.
Samuel Bakke	Norway	The cargo ship ran aground whilst going to the aid of Kina (Denmark). She was refloated and rescued five crew from Kina.

=== 31 December ===
List of shipwrecks: 31 December 1947
Ship	State	Description
Spencer	United States	The 61 GRT, 64.5-foot (19.7 m) motor cargo vessel sank at Kanatak (57°34′05″N 156°02′15″W), Territory of Alaska.

== Unknown date ==
List of shipwrecks: Unknown date 1947
Ship	State	Description
Alek	Norway	The cargo ship sank off Farsund, Norway.
Alice L. Pendleton	United States	The 228-foot (69 m), 1,349 GRT four-masted lumber schooner was abandoned at the Palmer Shipyard on the west side of the Mystic River in Noank, Connecticut, sometime during the 1940s, gradually rotted away, and settled on the river bottom in 10 feet (3.0 m) of water.
Ark	United States	The motor vessel blew ashore and broke up in Amalga Harbor (58°29′30″N 134°47′20″W) in Southeast Alaska sometime during or after 1947.
B D Co. No. 7	United States	The 67-ton, 60-foot (18.3 m) wooden scow was wrecked on the shore at Cape Suckling (59°59′30″N 145°53′00″W), Territory of Alaska, in late 1947.
John I. Nolan	United States	The Liberty ship struck a reef in the Pacific Ocean and was severely damaged. She was declared a constructive total loss.
Lanikai	United States Navy	The decommissioned schooner sank in Subic Bay in a storm in February 1946 or during a typhoon sometime in 1947.
USS Lignite	United States Army	The Trefoil-class concrete barge, while under tow, broke free during a typhoon and ended up on the fringing reef off Eil Malk, Palau (7°9′15″N 134°21′45″E) sometime before salvage of her cargo started in September.
Unknown	France	A concrete-hulled tugboat, possibly converted to a barge, was wrecked on Omaha Beach, Normandy, in a winter storm in 1946 or 1947. Broken up as a hazard to swimmers in March 2023.

== See also ==
- Lists of shipwrecks
