= List of Ocean ships =

This is a list of Ocean ships.

== Description ==
The Ocean ships were a class of 60 cargo ships built in the United States during World War II and ordered by the British Purchasing Commission. The purchase was approved by the National Defense Commission, the United States Navy Department and the United States Maritime Commission. All had names prefixed with "Ocean". The ships were 441 feet 6 inches (134.57 m) long overall, with a beam of 57 feet 0 inches (17.37 m). They were powered by triple expansion steam engines which could propel the ships at a speed of 11 knots (20 km/h). The ships were assessed at about 10,000 DWT.

== Ocean Angel ==
Ocean Angel was built by Todd Shipyards Corporation, Bath, Maine, United States. She was completed in October 1942. Built for the Ministry of War Transport (MoWT), she was placed under the management of Barr, Crombie & Co. Transferred to the Ministry of Transport (MoT) in 1946 and placed under the management of Alcyone Shipping Finance Co. Sold to her managers in 1951 and renamed Alcyone Angel. Sold to Compania de Navegacion San Augustin S.A., Monrovia, Liberia in 1956 and renamed Continental. Scrapped in Taiwan in 1960.

== Ocean Athlete ==
Ocean Athlete was built by Todd Shipyards Corporation. She was completed in August 1942. Built for the MoWT, she was placed under the management of C. T. Bowring & Co. Transferred to the Dutch Government in 1943 and renamed Govert Flinck. Operated under the management of Koninklijke Rotterdamsche Lloyd. Sold to her managers in 1946, renamed Ternate in 1947. Sold in 1959 to Dah Lien Shipping Co., Hong Kong and renamed Casert. Sold to Chinese owners in 1960 and renamed Hoping 75. Renamed Zhan Dou 75 in 1967. Reported scapped at Shanghai in 1985.

== Ocean Courage ==
Ocean Courage was built by Todd Shipyards Corporation. She was launched in June 1942. Built for the MoWT, she was placed under the management of the Hain Steamship Co. She was torpedoed and sunk in the Atlantic Ocean off the west coast of Africa (10°52′N 23°28′W) by German submarine U-182 on 1 March 1943.

== Ocean Courier ==
Ocean Courier was built by Todd Shipyards Corporation. She was completed in October 1942. Built for the MoWT, she was placed under the management of Larrinaga Steamship Co. She was torpedoed and damaged in the English Channel by Kriegsmarine E-boats. Management transferred to Cayzer, Irvine & Co in 1946. Sold to Clan Line in 1948 and renamed Clan MacBean. Scrapped in Hong Kong in 1960.

== Ocean Crusader ==
Ocean Crusader was built by Todd Shipyards Corporation. She was launched on 18 October 1942. She was completed in November. Built for the MoWT, she was placed under the management of Dodd, Thompson & Co. Torpedoed and sunk in the Atlantic Ocean (50°30′N 45°30′W) by German submarine U-262 on 26 November 1942.

== Ocean Faith ==
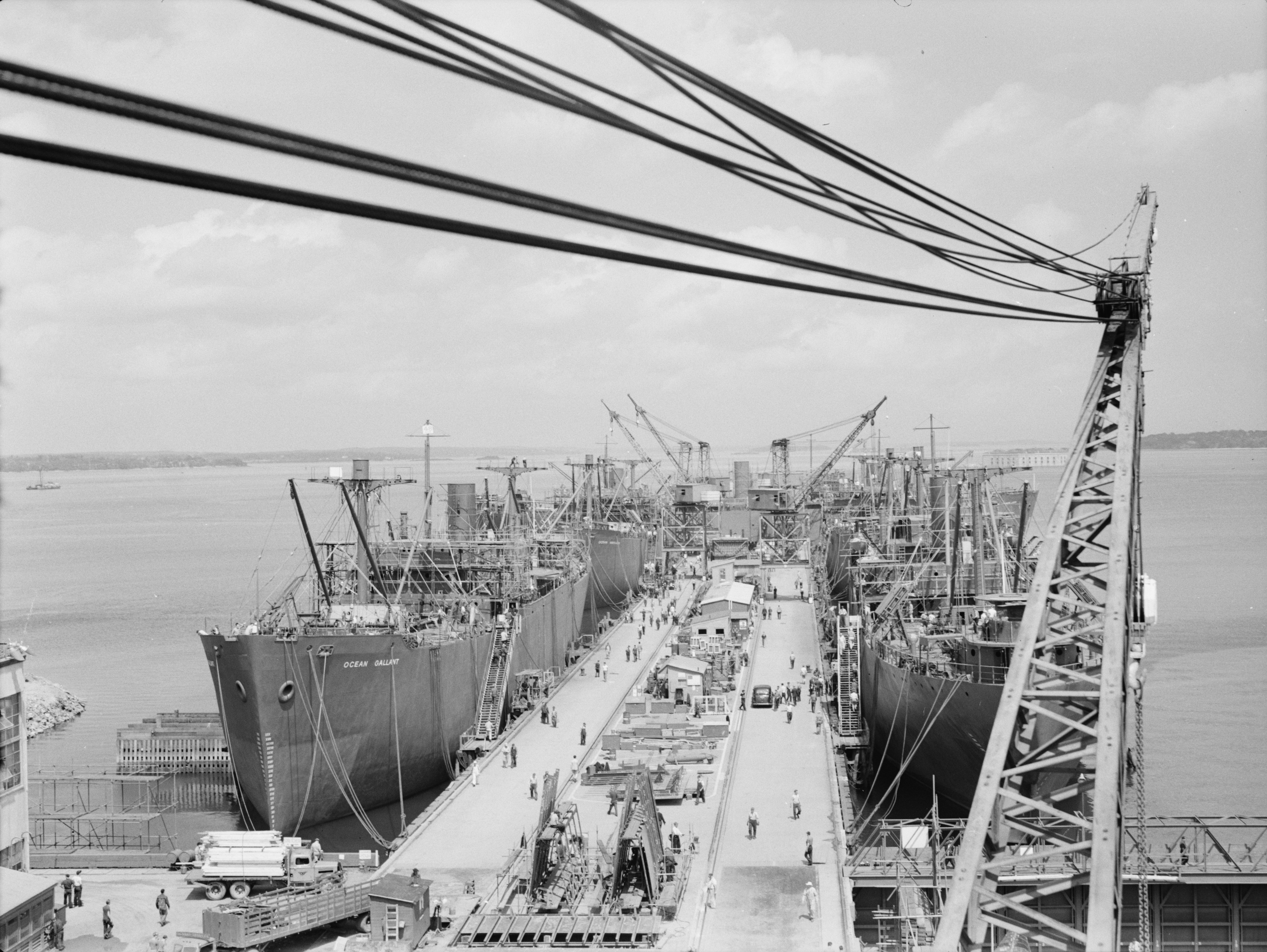
Ocean Honour, Ocean Faith, and Ocean Hope

Ocean Faith was built by Todd Shipyards Corporation. She was completed in May 1942. Built for the MoWT, she was placed under the management of Headlam & Son. She was bombed and damaged in the Atlantic Ocean off the coast of Portugal on15 August 1943. Management transferred to Neill & Pandelis Ltd in 1946. Sold to Ascot Shipping Co. in 1949 and renamed Avisdale. Sold to Aviation & Shipping Co. Ltd. in 1954 then sold to Compania de Navigacion San Rocco S.A., Costa Rica in 1955 and renamed Uje. Reflagged to Panama in 1959. Scrapped in Italy in 1962.

== Ocean Fame ==
Ocean Fame was built by Todd Shipyards Corporation. She was completed in July 1942. Built for the MoWT, she was placed under the management of W. H. Seager & Co. Sold in 1947 to Ropner Shipping Co, West Hartlepool. and renamed Firby. Sold in 1955 to N. G. Kyrikides Shipping Co., London and renamed Irene K.. Placed under the management of Winchester Shipping Co. in 1959. Renamed Winchester Queen in 1964. Scrapped at Bilbao, Spain in 1966.

== Ocean Freedom ==
Ocean Freedom was built by Todd Shipyards Corporation. She was completed in April 1942. Built for the MoWT, she was placed under the management of J. & J. Denholm Ltd. She was bombed and sunk at Murmansk, Soviet Union on 13 March 1943. Refloated on 1 June, subsequently scrapped.

== Ocean Gallant ==
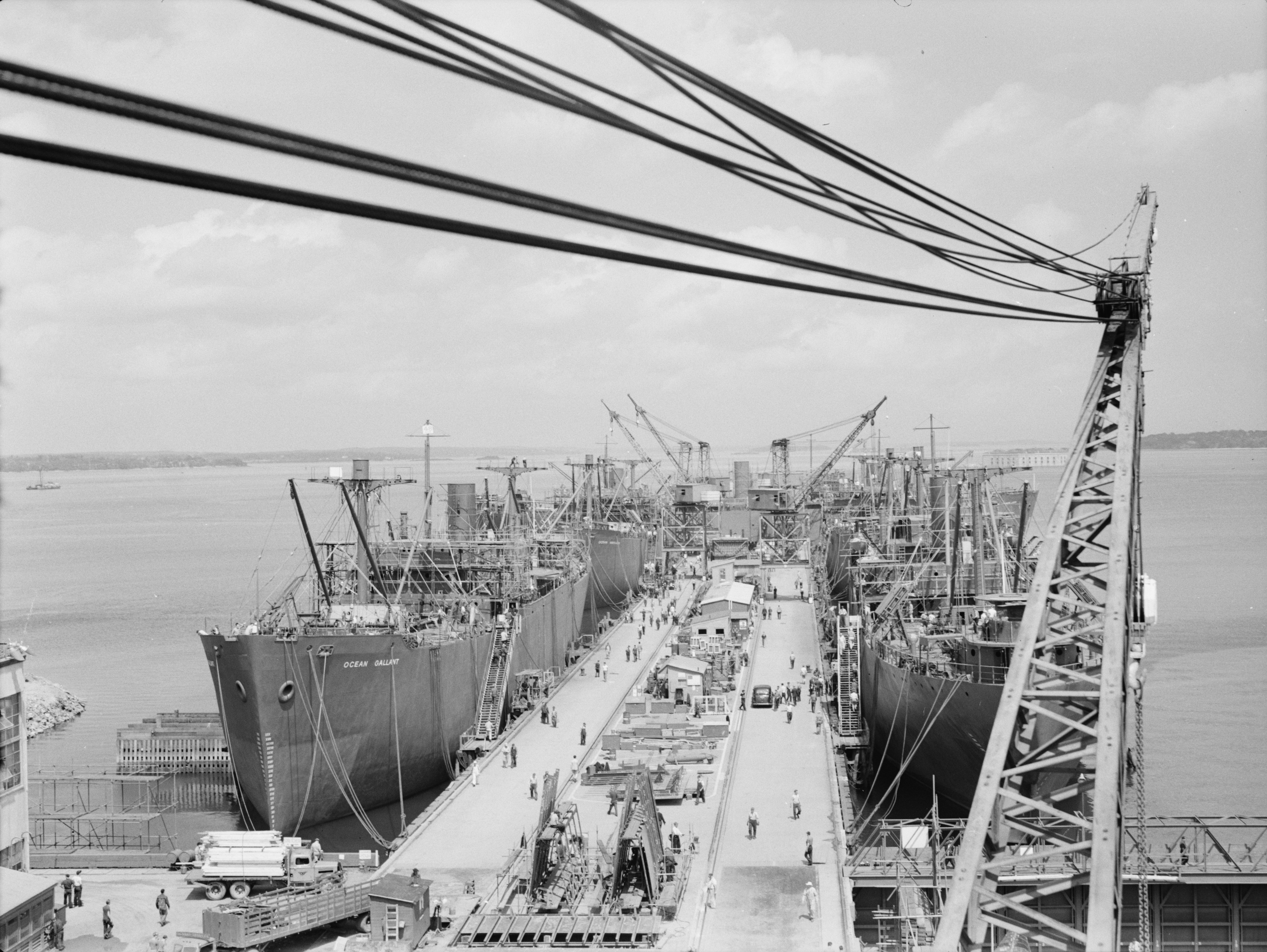
Ocean Gallant and four other Ocean ships, 16 August 1942.

Ocean Gallant was built by Todd Shipyards Corporation. She was launched on 16 August 1942. She was completed in October. Built for the MoWT, she was placed under the management of Turnball, Scott & Co. Sold to Ben Line Steamers Ltd. in 1946 and renamed Bennevis. Operated under the management of William Thompson & Co. Sold to the Rodney Steamship Co., London in 1959 and renamed Charles Dickens. Sold to Chine Shippin Co., London in 1961. Sold to Pedoulas Compania Navigacion S.A., Panama in 1962 and renamed Cleo. Scrapped at Sakai, Japan in 1967.

== Ocean Glory ==
Ocean Glory was built by Todd Shipyards Corporation. She was launched on 18 October 1942. She was completed in November. Built for the MoWT, she was placed under the management of J. & C. Harrison Ltd. To MoT in 1946 and placed under the management of Cayzer, Irvine & Co Ltd. Sold to Clan Line in 1948 band renamed Clan Macbeth. Sold to Panamanian Oriental Steamship Corporation, Panama in 1959 and renamed Madonna. Sold to Sincere Navigation Corporation, Keelung, Taiwan in 1966 and renamed Sincere Trader. Scrapped in Taiwan in 1964.

== Ocean Gypsy ==
Ocean Gypsy was built by Todd Shipyards Corporation. She was launched on 18 October 1942. She was completed in November. Built for the MoWT, she was placed under the management of J. & C. Harrison Ltd. To MoT in 1946 and placed under the management of Cayzer, Irvine & Co. Ltd. Sold to Clan Line in 1948 and renamed Clan Macbride. Sold to Panamanian Oriental Steamship Corporation, Panama in 1958 and renamed Alice. Operated under the management of Wheelock, Marden & Co. Sold to Valles Steamship Co., Panama in 1960. Scrapped at Hirao, Japan in 1966.

== Ocean Honour ==
Ocean Honour was built by Todd Shipyards Corporation. She was completed in May 1942. Built for the MoWT, she was placed under the management of Chellew Navigation Co. Torpedoed, shelled and sunk in the Indian Ocean (12°48′N 50°50′E) by I-29 on 16 September 1942.

== Ocean Hope ==
Ocean Hope was built by Todd Shipyards Corporation. She was completed in May 1942. Built for the MoWT, she was placed under the management of Haldin & Philipps Ltd. Transferred to the Polish Government in 1943, she was placed under the management of Gdynia America Line and renamed Białystock. Sold to Polskie Linie Oceaniczne in 1951, then Polska Żegluga Morska in 1956. Scrapped at Bilbao in 1971.

== Ocean Hunter ==
Ocean Hunter was built byy Todd Shipyards Corporation. She was completed in October 1942. Built for the MoWT, she was placed under the management of J. Robinson & Sons. Torpedoed and sunk in the Mediterranean Sea (36°07′N 0°11′W) by Axis aircraft on 10 January 1944.

== Ocean Justice ==
Ocean Justice was built by Todd Shipyards Corporation. She was completed in April 1942. Built for the MoWT, she was placed under the management of Hain Steamship Co. Torpedoed and sunk in the Atlantic Ocean (10°06′N 60°00′W) by U-505 on 6 November 1942.

== Ocean Liberty ==
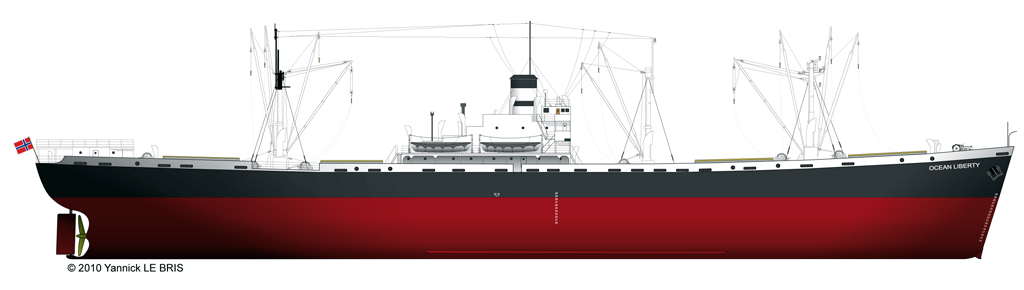
Ocean Liberty

Ocean Liberty was built by Todd Shipyards Corporation. She was completed in March 1942. Built for the MoWT, she was placed under the management of Mitchell, Cotts & Co. To MoT in 1946 and placed under the management of The Saint Line Ltd, then Neill & Pandelis Ltd. later that year. Sold to Ascot Shipping Ltd., London in 1948 and renamed Avismoat. Sold to Aviation & Shipping Co. in 1954. Sold to Romney Steamship Co, London in 1955 and renamed Claire T. Thereafter operated under the management of Tsavliris Shipping Ltd. Sold to Nigean Shipping Co., Monrovia, Liberia in 1958 and renamed Free Trader. Reflagged to Greece in 1959 and renamed Theodoros Tsavliris. Sold to Trafalgar Shipping Co. Ltd., London in 1964 and renamed Newgrove. Sold to Kantara Shipping Co., Famagusta, Cyprus in 1965. Ran aground off Puerto Padre, Cuba on 14 May 1966. The wreck was abandoned to Cuban authorities.

== Ocean Merchant ==
Ocean Merchant was built by Todd Shipyards Corporation. She was completed in August 1942. Built for the MoWT, she was placed under the management of Morels Ltd. Transferred to the Dutch Government in 1943, she was placed under the management of Koninklijke Nederlandse Stoomboot-Maatschappij and renamed Jan Lievens. Sold in 19046 to N.V. Reederij Amsterdam, Amsterdam and renamed Amstelstad. Sold in 1959 to Wakken & Co. Ltd., Hong Kong and renamed Dunn Sold in 1960 to Chinese owners and renamed Ho Ping 26. Renamed Zhan Dou 26 in 1967. In service in late 1970s, deleted from shipping registers in 1992.

== Ocean Messenger ==
Ocean Messenger was built by Todd Shipyards Corporation. She was completed in October 1942. Built for the MoWT, she was placed under the management of Watts, Watts & Co. To MoT in 1946 and placed under the management of Cayzer, Irvine & Co. Sold to Clan Line in 1948 and renamed Clan Macbrayne. Sold to King Line, Glasgow in 1960. Scrapped at Mihara, Japan in 1960.

== Ocean Might ==
Ocean Might was built by Todd Shipyards Corporation. She was completed in June 1942. Built for the MoWT, she was placed under the management of Maclay & McIntyre Ltd. Torpedoed and sunk in the Atlantic Ocean (0°57′N 4°11′W) by U-109 on 2 September 1942.

== Ocean Peace ==
Ocean Peace was built by Todd Shipyards Corporation. She was completed in April 1942. Built for the MoWT, she was placed under the management of Hais Steamship Co. Bombed and sunk by Axis aircraft off Avola, Sicily, Italy (36°55′N 15°13′E) on 12 July 1943.

== Ocean Pilgrim ==
Ocean Pilgrim was built by Todd Shipyards Corporation. She was completed in August 1942. Built for the MoWT, she was placed under the management of Dene Shipping Co. Sold in 1947 to Pool Shipping Co. Ltd., West Hartlepool and renamed Pikepool. Operated under the management of Sir R. Ropner & Co. Sold in 1959 to Nevada Co. Ltd., Piraeus, Greece and renamed Marigo. Sold in 1966 to Amfitriti Shipping Co., Famagusta, Cyprus and renamed Amfitriti. Scrapped at Kaohsiung, Taiwan in 1968.

== Ocean Pride ==
Ocean Pride was built by Todd Shipyards Corporation. She was completed in June 1942. Built for the MoWT, she was placed under the management of Sir W. Reardon Smith & Sons. Sold in 1947 to Ropner Shipping Co and renamed Oakby. Sold in 1959 to Master Shipping Co., Beirut, Lebanon and renamed Erinio. Sold in 1964 to Penelope Steamship Co., Monrovia and renamed Penelope S. Operated under the management of G. & P. Lygnos. Sold in 1965 to Marvencedor Compania Navigacion, Monrovia and renamed Susana K. L. Operated under the management of Litonjua & Co. Suffered a boiler room fire in 1966 and consequently scrapped in Taiwan.

== Ocean Rider ==
Ocean Rider was built by Todd Shipyards Corporation. She was completed in August 1942. Built for the MoWT, she was placed under the management of Larrinaga Steamship Co. Bombed and damaged in the Mediterranean Sea off Cape Caxine, Algeria on 21 January 1943. Sold in 1947 to N. G. Kyriakides Shipping Co. and renamed Nicholas K. Sold to Winchester Shipping Co in 1959. Renamed Winchester King in 1964. Sold in 1966 to Intertrader Shipping Co., Panama and renamed Pacific Trader Renamed Karimantan in 1968, scrapped in Taiwan later that year.

== Ocean Seaman ==
Ocean Seaman was built by Todd Shipyards Corporation. She was launched on 16 August 1942. She was completed in September. Built for the MoWT, she was placed under the management of F. C. Strick & Co. Torpedoed and sunk in the Mediterranean Sea (36°55′N 1°31′E) by U-380 on 15 March 1943.

== Ocean Stranger ==
Ocean Stranger was built by Todd Shipyards Corporation. She was launched on 16 August 1942. She was completed in September. Built for the MoWT, she was placed under the management of Glen & Co. To MoT in 1946 and placed under the management of Alcyone Shipping Finance Co. Sold to her managers in 1948 and renamed Alcyone Fortune. Sold in 1951 to Compania Maritimo Calivergo S.A., Panama and renamed Calygera. Operated under the management of A. Vergottis Ltd. Sold in 1954 to Alcyone Shipping Finance Ltd and renamed Alcyone Faith. Sold in 1956 to West Africa Navigation Ltd., Monrovia and renamed African Baron. Scrapped at Hirao in 1964.

== Ocean Strength ==
Ocean Strength was built by Todd Shipyards Corporation. She was completed in July 1942. Built for the MoWT, she was placed under the management of J. & J. Denholm Ltd. Sold in 1947 to Denholm Line Steamers Ltd., Greenock and renamed Broompark. Sold in 1951 to Andrew Crawford & Co., Glasgow and renamed Garryvale. Placed under the management of Buchanan Shipping Co. in 1953. Sold in 1957 to West African Navigation Ltd and renamed African Lady. Sold in 1958 to General Navigation Ltd, Monrovia. Scrapped at Osaka, Japan in 1965.

== Ocean Trader ==
Ocean Trader was built by Todd Shipyards Corporation. She was completed in July 1942. Built for the MoWT, she was placed under the management of Glen Line. Sold in 1947 to Drake Shipping co, Liverpool and renamed Merchant Royal. Sold in 1951 to Compania Armadora Transoceana S.A., Panama and renamed Oceana. Sold in 1960 to Compania Armadora Sabinal S.A., Panama and renamed Okeanis. Sold in 1966 to Salinama S.A., Panama and renamed Fides. Sold in 1968 to Marsalina Shipping Co., Famagusta and renamed Defis. Scrapped at Sakaide, Japan in 1969.

== Ocean Traveller ==
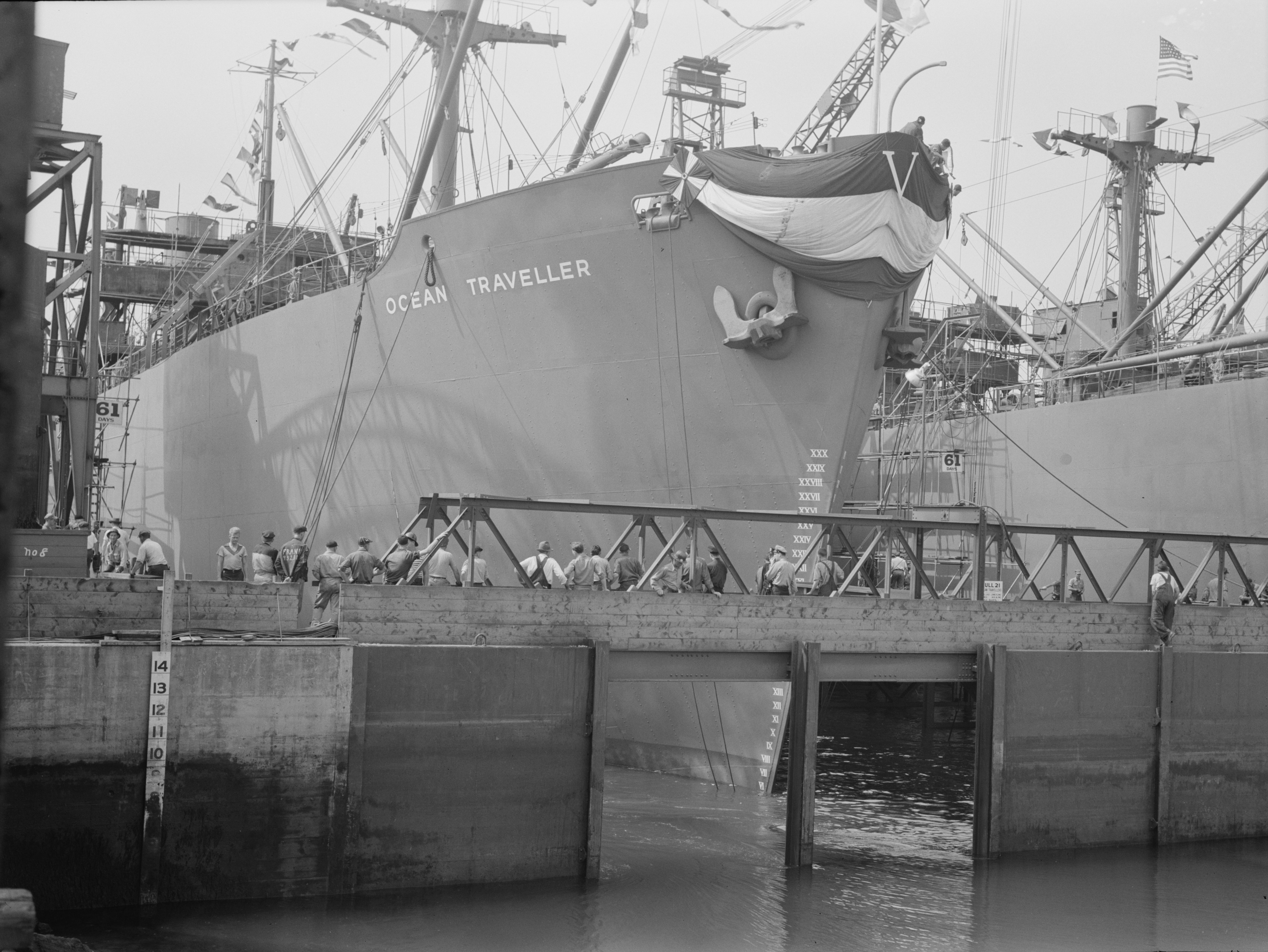
Launch of Ocean Traveller, 16 August 1942.

Ocean Traveller was built by Todd Shipyards Corporation. She was launched on 16 August 1942. She was completed in September. Built for the MoWT, she was placed under the management of Lyle Shipping Co. Sold to her managers in 1947 and renamed Cape Corso. Following a collision and grounding in 1959, she was scrapped in Hong Kong.

== Ocean Vagabond ==
Ocean Vagabond was built by Permanente Metals Corporation, Richmond, California. She was completed in July 1942. Built for the MoWT, she was placed under the management of W. Runciman & Co. Torpedoed and sunk in the Atlantic Ocean (57°17′N 20°11′W) by U-186 on 10 January 1943.

== Ocean Vagrant ==
Ocean Vagrant was built by Permanente Metals Corporation. She was completed in June 1942. Built for the MoWT, she was placed under the management of W. H. Cockerline & Co. To MoT in 1946 and placed under the management of Baltic Shipping Co. (Newcastle) Ltd., Bristol. Sold to her managers in 1948 and renamed Atlantic Vagrant. Sold in 1950 to Bolton Steam Shipping Ltd., London and renamed Raphael. Sold in 1951 to Compania de Vapores Siram S.A., Panama and renamed Siram. Operated under the management of M. A. Embiricos. Sold in 1961 to Syramar Compania Navigacion S.A., Syros, Greece and renamed Syros. Scrapped at Shanghai, China in 1968.

== Ocean Valentine ==
Ocean Valentine was built by Permanente Metals Corporation. She was completed in July 1942. Built for the MoWT, she was placed under the management of W. Thompson & Co. Sold in 1946 to Ben Line Steamers Ltd. and renamed Benlomond, remaining under the mamnagement of W. Thompson & Co. Sold in 1956 to Society Armadora del Pacifico S.A., Monrovia and renamed Yangos. Reflagged to Greece in 1960. Scrapped at Bilbao in 1966.

== Ocean Valley ==
Ocean Valley was built by Permanente Metals Corporation. She was completed in January 1942. Built for the MoWT, she was placed under the management of Capper, Alexander & Co. To MoT in 1947 and placed under the management of Houlder Bros. & Co. Sold in 1949 to Alexander Shipping Co., London and renamed Malmesbury. Operated under the management of Houlder Bros. & Co. Sold in 1955 to Trafalgar Steamship Co., London and renamed Granny Suzanne. Operated under the management of Tsavliris Ltd. Sold in 1958 to Nigean Shipping Co. and renamed Free Enterprise. Renamed Alexander Tsavliris in 1959 and reflagged to Greece. Sold in 1964 to Trafalgar Steamship Co. and renamed Newdene. Operated under the management of Tsavliris Ltd. Sold in 1965 to Kantara Shipping Co., Famagusta and renamed Free Navigator Scrapped at La Spezia, Italy in 1969.

== Ocean Valour ==
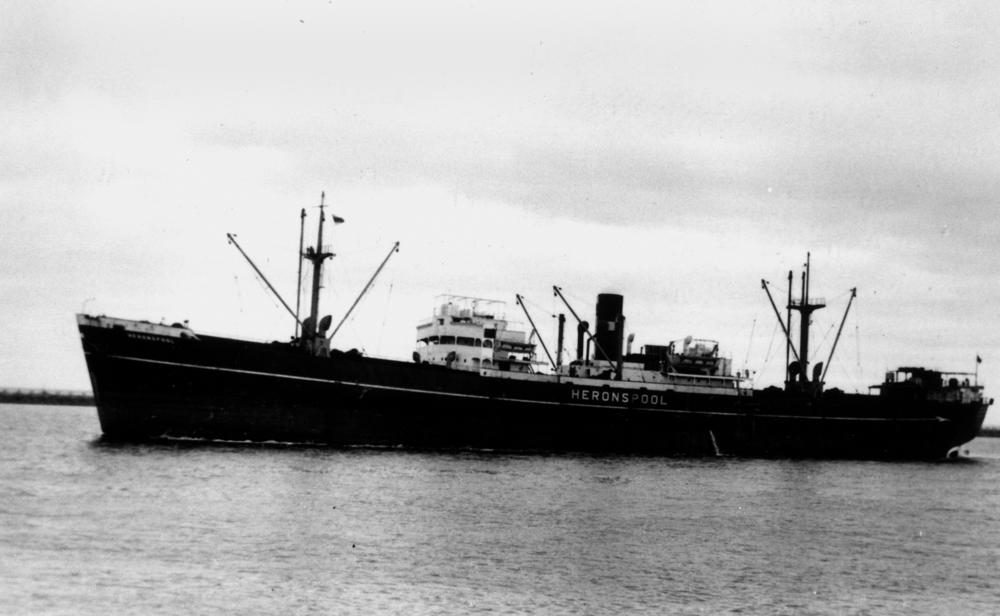
Heronspool

Ocean Valour was built by Permanente Metals Corporation. She was completed in March 1942. Built for the MoWT, she was placed under the management of W. A. Souter & Co. To MoT in 1946 and placed under the management of Sir R. Ropner & Co. Sold in 1947 to Pool Shipping Co., remaining under the same manager. Renamed Heronspool in 1949. Sold in 1955 to Achille Lauro and renamed Liana Scrapped at La Spezia in 1967.

== Ocean Vanguard ==
Ocean Vanguard was built by Permanente Metals Corporation. She was completed on 16 August 1941. Built for the MoWT, she was placed under the management of W. H. Seager & Co. Torpedoed and sunk in the Atlantic Ocean (10°43′N 60°11′W) by U-515 on 13 September 1942.

== Ocean Vanity ==
Ocean Vanity was built by Permanente Metals Corporation. She was completed in April 1942. Built for the MoWT, she was placed under the management of Raeburn & Verel Ltd. Sold in 1947 to Pool Shipping Co., West Hartlepool and renamed Teespool. Operated under the management of Sir R. Ropner & Co. Sold in 1960 to Clipper Steamship Co., West Hartlepool and renamed Wynn. Operated under the management of Wheelock, Marden & Co. Renamed Golden Phoenix in 1964. Sold in 1966 to Nassau Maritime Co., Bahamas. Scrapped at Onomichi, Japan in 1968.

== Ocean Vanquisher ==
Ocean Vanquisher was built by Permanente Metals Corporation. She was completed in July 1942. Built for the MoWT, she was placed under the management of H. Hogarth & Sons. Severely damaged by a limpet mine in the Bay of Algiers on 12 December 1942. Towed in to Oran, Algeria in 1945 and temporary repairs were made. Permanent repairs were made in 1946 by Cantiere Navale Riuniti, Palermo, Sicily. Sold that year to Società Ligure di Armamento, Genoa, Italy and renamed Nereo. Scrapped at Hirao in 1964.

== Ocean Vengeance ==
Ocean Vengeance was built by Permanente Metals Corporation. She was completed in May 1942. Built for the MoWT, she was placed under the management of Raeburn & Verel Ltd. Sold in 1947 to Ropner Shipping Co. and renamed Ingleby. Sold in 1960 to Chowgate Steamships (Bahamas) Ltd., Nassau, Bahamas and renamed Maratha Enterprise. Sold in 1966 to Welcome Shipping Corporation, Panama and renamed Welcome Scrapped at Kaohsiung in 1969.

== Ocean Venture ==
Ocean Venture was built by Permanente Metals Corporation. She was completed in December 1941. Built for the MoWT, she was placed under the management of Larrinaga Steamship Co. Torpedoed and sunk in the Atlantic Ocean (37°05′N 74°46′W) by U-108 on 8 September 1942.

== Ocean Venus ==
Ocean Venus was built by Permanente Metals Corporation. She was completed in March 1942. Built for the MoWT, she was placed under the management of J. Morrison & Son. Torpedoed and sunk in the Atlantic Ocean (28°23′N 80°21′W) by U-564 on 3 May 1942.

== Ocean Verity ==
Ocean Verity was built by Permanente Metals Corporation. She was completed in June 1942. Built for the MoWT, she was placed under the management of A. Holt & Co. Management transferred to Glen Line Ltd. in 1944. To MoT in 1946 and placed under the management of Cayzer, Irvine & Co. Sold in 1948 to Clan Line Steamers Ltd. and renamed Clan Keith. Struck rocks off Cape Bon, Tunisia and sank on 5 November 1961.

== Ocean Vesper ==
Ocean Vesper was built by Permanente Metals Corporation. She was completed in January 1942. Built for the MoWT, she was placed under the management of Connell & Grace Ltd. To MoT in 1946 and placed under the management of Thomson Steamshipping Co., Cardiff. Sold in 1951 to Clan Line Steamers Ltd. and renamed Clan MacQueen. Sold in 1953 to British & South American Steam Navigation Co., London and renamed Herminius. Operated under the management of Houston Line. Sold in 1957 to Houston Line, operated under the management of Cayzer, Irvine & Co. Sold in 1958 to Pan-Norse Steamship Co, Panama and renamed Ekberg. Sold in 1962 to Marine Development & Supply Co., Panama. Scrapped at Onomichi in 1965.

== Ocean Vestal ==
Ocean Vestal was built by Permanente Metals Corporation. She was completed in January 1942. Built for the MoWT, she was placed under the management of Kaye, Son & Co. Sold in 1946 to Thompson Steamshipping Co., Liverpool. Renamed Farningham in 1947. Sold in 1952 to British and South American Steam Navigation Co., London and renamed Hellenes. Operated under the management of Houston Line. Sold in 1958 to Malabar Steamship Co., Bombay, India and renamed Janmada. Scrapped at Bombay in 1962.

== Ocean Veteran ==
Ocean Veteran was built by Permanente Metals Corporation. She was completed in April 1942. Built for the MoWT, she was placed under the management of Counties Ship Management Co. Transferred to the Belgian Government in 1943 and renamed Belgian Veteran. Operated under the management of Agency Maritime International, Antwerp. Sold in 1948 to Compagnie Maritime Belge, Antwerp and renamed Capitaine Lauwerins. Operated under the management of Lloyd Royal. Sold in 1961 to Companie de Navigacion Indomitus S.A., Panama and renamed Sanrocco. Scrapped at La Spezia in 1970.

== Ocean Viceroy ==
Ocean Viceroy was built by Permanente Metals Corporation. She was completed in July 1942. Built for the MoWT, she was placed under the management of P. Henderson & Co. To MoT in 1946 and placed under the management of Cayzer, Irvine & Co. Sold in 1948 to Clan Line Steamers Ltd. and renamed Clan Kenneth. Sold in 1958 to Compania Concordia di Navigacion, Panama and renamed Omonia H. Caught fire at Amsterdam on 13 April 1966 and consequently scrapped at Hamburg, West Germany.

== Ocean Victory ==
Ocean Victory was built by Permanente Metals Corporation. She was completed in July 1942. Built for the MoWT, she was placed under the management of McGowan & Cross. Transferred to Dutch Government in 1943 and renamed Jan Steen Operated under the management of N.V. Stoomboot Maatschappij Nederland. Sold in 1946 to NV Reederij Amsterdam and renamed Amstelveen. Sold in 1959 to Eddie Steamship Co., Keelung and renamed Polly. Scrapped at Kaohsiung in 1963.

== Ocean Vigil ==
Ocean Vigil was built by Permanente Metals Corporation. She was completed in November 1941. Built for the MoWT, she was placed under the management of Bolton Steam Shipping Co. Sold in 1946 to her managers and renamed Ramsay. Sold in 1951 to Compania Naviera Maropan S.A., Panama and renamed Stork. Sold in 1954 to Compania Maritima de Navigacion S.A., Panama. Operated under the management of V. N. Goulandris. Sold in 1960 to Derna Compania di Navigacion, Beirut and renamed Roumeli. Ran aground at Gijón, Spain on 3 December 1963. Refloated and consequently scrapped.

== Ocean Vigour ==
Ocean Vigour was built by Permanente Metals Corporation. She was completed in March 1942. Built for the MoWT, she was placed under the management of E. R. Management Co. Sold in 1948 to The British Steam Shipping Co., Cardiff and renamed Ramillies. Operated under the management of J. Cory & Sons. Sold in 1954 to Orders & Handford Steamship Co., remaining under the same managers. Sold in 1955 to the Buchanan Shipping Co., Glasgow and renamed Galavale. Operated under the management of Andrew Crawford Ltd. Sold in 1957 to Corrada Società di Navigazione, Genoa, Italy and renamed Confidenza. Scrapped at La Spezia in 1967.

== Ocean Viking ==
Ocean Viking was built by Permanente Metals Corporation. She was completed in December 1941. Built for the MoWT, she was placed under the management of Bolton Steam Shipping Co. Struck a mine in the Mediterranean Sea (40°19′N 60°59′E and was damaged on 11 October 1943 and put in to Taranto, Italy. Scuttled as a breakwater at Bari, Italy in January 1944. Refloated in 1947 and repaired. Sold to Società Ligure di Armamento, Genoa and renamed Alceo. Sold in 1963 to Compania Comercial y Financiera Sudamericana, Panama and renamed Allegra. Scrapped at Bilbao in 1969.

== Ocean Vintage ==
Ocean Vintage was built by Permanente Metals Corporation. She was completed in April 1942. Built for the MoWT, she was placed under the management of Muir Young Ltd. Torpedoed and sunk in the Indian Ocean (21°37′N 60°06′E by I-27 on 22 October 1942.

== Ocean Virtue ==
Ocean Virtue was built by Permanente Metals Corporation. She was completed in July 1942. Built for the MoWT, she was placed under the management of Prince Line Ltd. Bombed and sunk by Luftwaffe aircraft at Augusta, Sicily on 21 July 1943, she was salvaged later that year. Towed to Catania in 1944, she was rebuilt in 1946 to accommodate passengers. Sold to Giacomo Costa fu Andrea, Genoa in 1948 and renamed Andrea C. Lengthened in 1959, and sold to Costa Armator S.p.A., Genoa in 1969. Scrapped at La Spezia in 1983.

== Ocean Viscount ==
Ocean Viscount was built by Permanente Metals Corporation. She was completed in June 1942. Built for the MoWT, she was placed under the management of Bibby Line Ltd. To MoT in 1946 and placed under the management of Cayzer, Irvine & Co. Sold in 1948 to Clan Line Steamers Ltd and renamed Clan Kennedy. Sold in 1959 to Eddie Steamship Co., Keelung and renamed Kelly Scrapped in Taiwan in 1959.

== Ocean Vision ==
Ocean Vision was built by Permanente Metals Corporation. She was completed in February 1942. Built for the MoWT, she was placed under the management of Haldin & Philipps Ltd. Sold in 1946 to The Aviation & Shipping Co. Ltd. Renamed Avismere in 1947. Sold in 1955 to International Navigation Corporation, Monrovia and renamed Deep River Scrapped at La Spezia in 1962.

== Ocean Vista ==
Ocean Vista was built by Permanente Metals Corporation. She was completed in May 1942. Built for the MoWT, she was placed under the management of The Saint Line Ltd. Sold to her managers in 1948 and renamed Saint Edmund. Sold in 1962 to Achille Lauro and renamed Lucrino. Scrapped at La Spezia in 1970.

== Ocean Voice ==
Ocean Voice was built by Permanente Metals Corporation. She was completed in November 1941. Built for the MoWT, she was placed under the management of Larrinaga Steamship Co. Torpedoed and sunk in the Atlantic Ocean (71°23′N 11°01′W) by U-435 on 22 September 1942.

== Ocean Volga ==
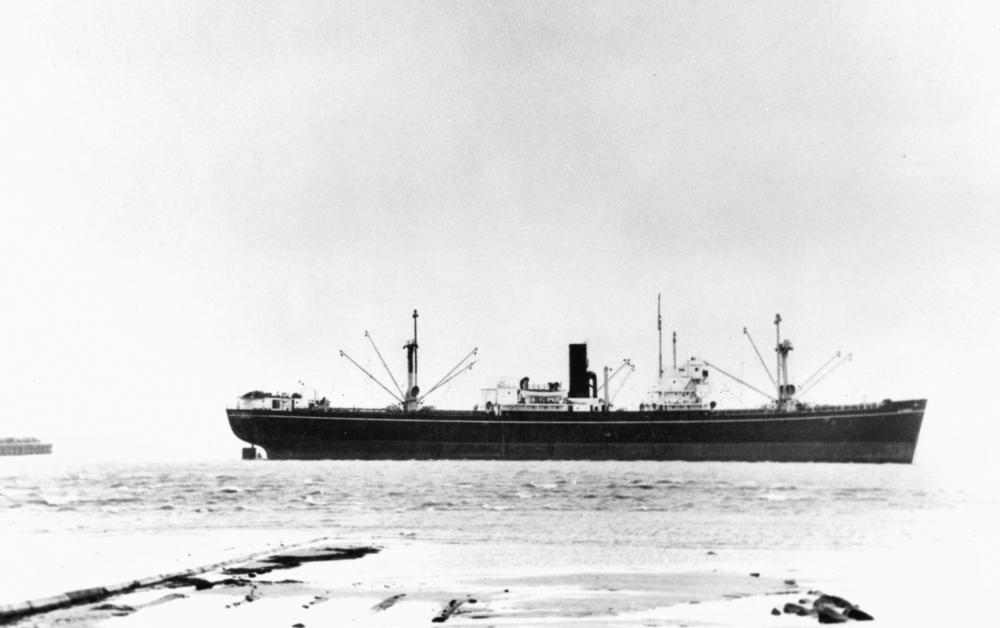
Sithonia

Ocean Volga was built by Permanente Metals Corporation. She was completed in May 1942. Built for the MoWT, she was placed under the management of H. M. Thomson. Sold to her managers in 1946 and renamed Sithonia. Scrapped at Preston, Lancashire in 1962.

== Ocean Volunteer ==
Ocean Volunteer was built by Permanente Metals Corporation. She was completed in April 1942. Built for the MoWT, she was placed under the management of W. H. Cockerline & Co. To MoT in 1946 and placed under the management of Alcyone Shipping & Finance Ltd. Sold to her managers in 1949 and renamed Alcyone Union. Sold in 1950 to Ben Line Steamers Ltd and renamed Benrinnes. Sold in 1959 to Queensland Shipping Co. Ltd, Leith and renamed Twinbear. Renamed Kuala Trengganu in 1962. Scrapped at Osaka in 1963.

== Ocean Voyager ==
Ocean Voyager was built by Permanente Metals Corporation. She was completed in April 1942. Built for the MoWT, she was placed under the management of H. Hogarth & Sons. Bombed, set afire, exploded and sunk at Tripoli, Libya on 19 March 1943.

== Ocean Vulcan ==
Ocean Vulcan was built by Permanente Metals Corporation. She was completed in February 1942. Built for the MoWT, she was placed under the management of Idwal Williams & Co. Sold in 1948 to Lyle Shipping Co., Glasgow and renamed Cape Nelson. Sold in 1959 to Marine Navigation Co., Hong Kong. Sold in 1960 to Sunshine Shipping Co., Hong Kong and renamed Happy Sunshine. Sold later that year to Ace Shipping Co., Hong Kong and renamed Marine Discoverer. Sold in 1961 to Lotus Shipping Co., Hong Kong then sold in 1964 to Vine Shipping Co., Hong Kong. Scrapped at Hirao in 1967.

== Ocean Wanderer ==
Ocean Wanderer was built by Permanente Metals Corporation. She was completed in July 1942. Built for the MoWT, she was placed under the management of Donaldson Bros. & Black. To MoT in 1946 and placed under the management of Bolton Steam Shipping Co. Sold to her managers in 1947 and renamed Ruysdael. Sold in 1951 to Kronos Compania Navigacion, Puerto Limon, Costa Rica and renamed Santa Irene. Operated under the management of C. & E. Pateras. Wrecked on the Los Cabezos Shoal, west of Tarifa, Spain on 2 November 1962.

== Ocean Wayfarer ==
Ocean Wayfarer was built by Permanente Metals Corporation. She was launched on 16 August 1942. She was completed in September. Built for the MoWT, she was placed under the management of Thompson Steamshipping Co. Sold in 1951 to Clan Line Steamers Ltd. and renamed Clan Macquarrie. Ran aground west of the Butt of Lewis in 1953 and consequently scrapped at Troon, Ayrshire.

== See also ==
- Empire ship
- Fort ship
- Liberty ship
- Victory ship
