= Ocean Victory =

A number of vessels have been named Ocean Victory

- SS Ocean Victory, an Ocean ship in service 1942–1963
- MY Ocean Victory, a motor yacht built in 2009
- MY Ocean Victory, a 140 m (459 ft) motor yacht built in 2014
- semi-submersible Ocean Victory (semi-submersible), a drilling rig
