= SS Ocean Vigour =

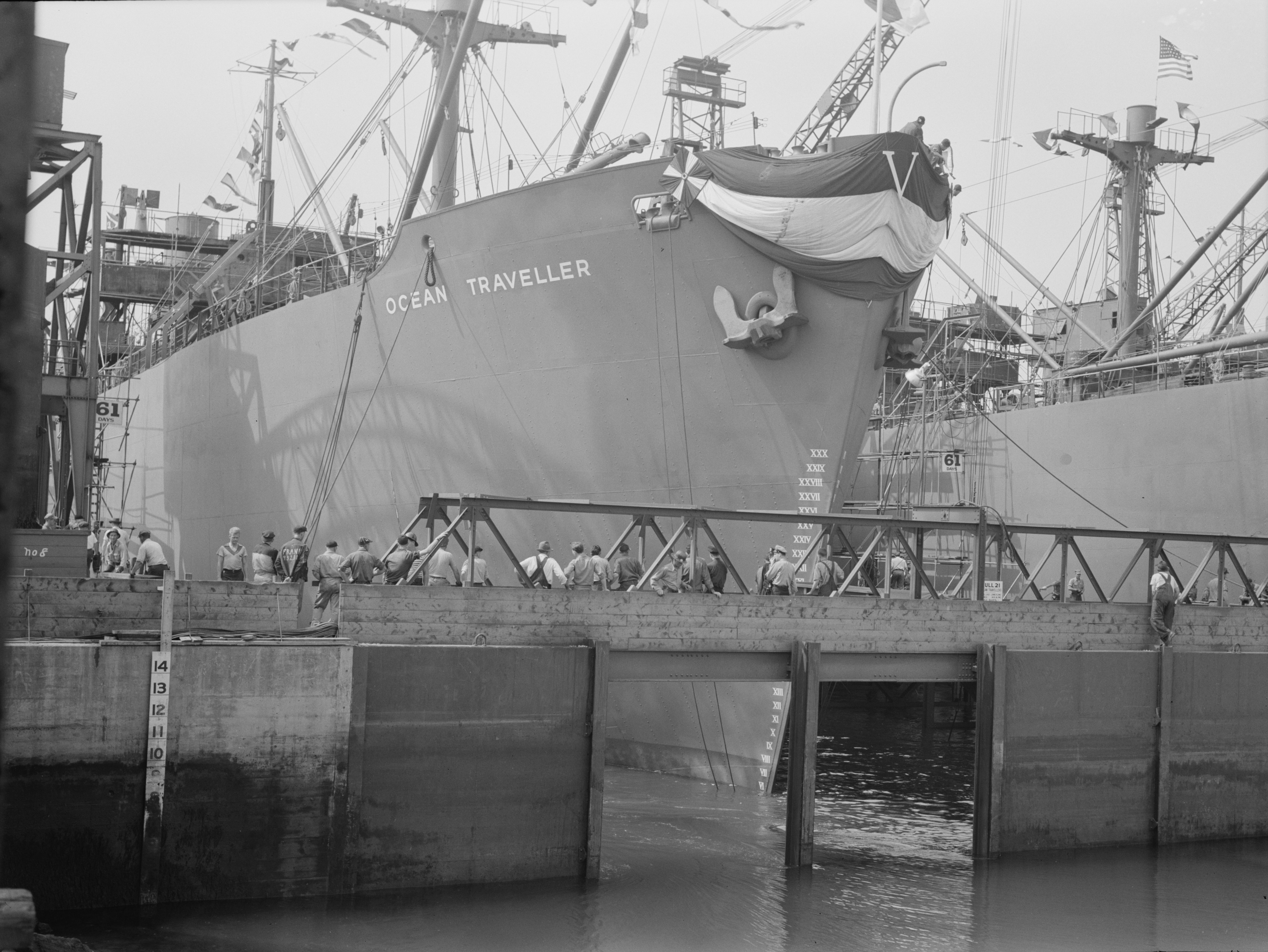
- Sister ship Ocean Traveller launched August, 1942

History
- Name: Ocean Vigour (1942-1948); Ramillies (1948-1955); Galavale (1955-1957); Confidenza (1957-1967)
- Owner: Ministry of War Transport (1942-1948); British Steam Shipping Co. (1948-1954); Orders & Handford SS Co. (1954-1955); Buchanan Shipping Co. (1955-1957); Corrado Società Anonima di Navigazione (1957-1967)
- Operator: E.R. Management Co., Liverpool (1942-1948); J. Cory & Sons, Cardiff (1948-1955); Andrew Crawford Ltd., Glasgow (1955-1957); Corrado Soc. di Nav., Genoa (1957-1967)
- Builder: Richmond Shipyards, Richmond, California
- Launched: 14 February 1942
- Identification: Official number:168826
- Fate: Scrapped, 1967

General characteristics
- Class & type: Ocean class cargo ship
- Tonnage: 7,174 GRT
- Length: 416 ft (127 m)
- Beam: 57 ft (17 m)
- Propulsion: 1 × General Machinery Corp. triple expansion steam engine
- Speed: 11 knots (20 km/h; 13 mph)

SS Ocean Vigour was a British Ocean class freighter, which served on various convoys during World War II, and then as a troopship before being used to deport illegal Jewish immigrants who attempted to enter Mandate Palestine to internment camps in Cyprus. She took part in the return of immigrants from the SS Exodus back to Europe, before being sold into commercial service. She was scrapped in 1967.

== Ship history ==
She was built at Kaiser Richmond No. 1 Yard in Richmond, California, one of 30 ships.

=== World War II ===
Ocean Vigour was built at Permanente Metals Richmond shipyard No.1 in Richmond, California, one of 60 ships of this class constructed for the British Ministry of War Transport, and launched on 14 February 1942.

Operated by the E. R. Management Company of Liverpool on behalf of the Ministry of War Transport, Ocean Vigour was employed on convoys across the Atlantic and into the Mediterranean in 1942-1943, and between June and August 1944 she is recorded on sailing on seven convoys between the English port of Southend and the Baie de la Seine on the northern coast of France.

=== Post-war activities ===
Under the designation HMT Ocean Vigour the ship was operating the eastern Mediterranean, employed in transporting illegal Jewish immigrants to detention camps in Cyprus. On 2 April 1947, a sabotage unit of the Palyam detonated a bomb aboard while she was moored at Famagusta, Cyprus.

On 18 July 1947 the SS Exodus was captured by a squadron of British naval ships and escorted into Haifa. The 4,515 immigrants were transferred into three British ships, Runnymede Park, Empire Rival and Ocean Vigour, which sailed for Port-de-Bouc, France. However most of the immigrants refused to leave the ship, and eventually they sailed for Hamburg, Germany, where on 8 September, the 1,464 immigrants aboard Ocean Vigour were forcibly disembarked by military police and soldiers equipped with truncheons and tear gas, and taken to internment camps in Lübeck.

After Israeli Independence in 1948, the Ocean Vigour was tasked with deporting Irgun and Lehi members who had been interned in African prison camps, in Britain's African colonies. On 9 July 1948, the Ocean Vigour set sail for Israel with 262 detainees aboard, and arrived in Israel three days later.

=== Later career ===
In 1948 the ship was sold to the British Steam Shipping Company, and managed by J. Cory & Sons of Cardiff, under the name Ramillies. She was sold to the Orders & Handford Steamship Company in 1954, but remained under Cory's management until sold again in 1955 to the Buchanan Shipping Company and renamed Galavale, managed by Andrew Crawford Ltd. of Glasgow. Finally in 1957 the ship was sold to the Italian company Corrado Società Anonima di Navigazione of Genoa, who operated her under the name Confidenza until 1967, when she was scrapped in La Spezia.
