= MV Aqueity =

Aqueity was the name of a number of ships operated by F T Everard, including:

- MV Aqueity (1934)
- MV Aqueity (1945)
- MV Aqueity (1946)
