= SS St. Lawrence Victory =

Former US Navy cargo ship (1945–1973)

- Typical Victory ship

History

United States
- Operator: Agwilines Inc
- Builder: Permanente Metals, plant No. 2
- Laid down: January 25, 1945
- Launched: March 7, 1945
- Completed: March 31, 1945
- Identification: IMO.5156220
- Fate: Sold several times, scrapped in 1973

General characteristics
- Class & type: VC2-S-AP3 Victory ship
- Tonnage: 7,612 GRT, 4,553 NRT
- Displacement: 15,200 tons
- Length: 455 ft (139 m)
- Beam: 62 ft (19 m)
- Draught: 28 ft (8.5 m)
- Installed power: 8,500 shp (6,300 kW)
- Propulsion: HP & LP turbines geared to a single 20.5-foot (6.2 m) propeller
- Speed: 16.5 knots (30.6 km/h; 19.0 mph)
- Boats & landing craft carried: 4 lifeboats
- Complement: 62 Merchant Marine and 28 US Naval Armed Guards
- Armament: 1 × 5-inch (127 mm)/38 caliber gun; 1 × 3-inch (76 mm)/50 caliber gun; 8 × 20 mm Oerlikon

SS St. Lawrence Victory (MCV-735) was a type VC2-S-AP2 Victory-class cargo ship built for the United States during World War II. The ship was built as part of the Emergency Shipbuilding program by Permanente Metals Corporation in Yard 2 of the Richmond Shipyards in Richmond, California.

Launched in March 1945, the St. Lawrence Victory delivered supplies for the Pacific War. After the war, it served as a relief ship delivering supplies to Europe under the Marshall Plan. Damaged by a naval mine in 1947, it was salvaged by Yugoslavia then changed hands several times in private use before it was scrapped in 1973.

== Early history ==
St. Lawrence Victory's keel was laid on January 25, 1945, before being christened on March 31, 1945. The St. Lawrence Victory was a US Maritime Administration armed cargo ship, named for St. Lawrence University in St. Lawrence County, New York as one of 150 educational institutions which had Victory ships named after them. Constructed for the US Maritime Commission (MARCOM), this 10,600-ton ship was built at the Oregon Shipbuilding yards in just 65 days. The ship was operated by the Agwilines Inc under the United States Merchant Marine act for the War Shipping Administration.

Victory ships were designed to replace the earlier Liberty ships. Liberty ships were intended to be used solely for World War II. In contrast, Victory ships were built to last longer and serve the US Navy after the war. The Victory ship differed from a Liberty ship in that they were faster, longer, wider, taller, and had a thinner stack set farther toward the superstructure and a long raised forecastle.

== Missions ==
The first mission of the St. Lawrence Victory was to deliver bombs to Saipan for the Pacific War. Loaded with her maximum weight of 10,000 tons of explosive material, the ship traversed the Pacific Ocean to Saipan, traveling in a zig-zag motion to elude Japanese submarines; the ship journeyed under radio silence and without running lights at night. After delivering her cargo, she proceeded to Seattle, arriving in July 1945. On August 27 of that year, the St. Lawrence Victory joined Task Group 30.8, a Sea Logistics Group delivering supplies to troops stationed on Guam.

After the war, the SS St. Lawrence Victory served as a relief ship as part of the Marshall Plan, carrying supplies to war-torn European nations. The cargo ship continued to serve in this capacity until March 25, 1947, when it hit a sea mine off the coast of Dubrovnik, Yugoslavia. With a damaged bow and in danger of sinking, she was deliberately run aground on Korčula Island before being towed to port at Split, Croatia. Afterwards, she was claimed by Yugoslavia as a marine salvage ship, eventually repaired and put into private use as a passenger ship.

== Japan surrender ceremony ==
St. Lawrence Victory was one of only two civilian cargo ships in Tokyo Bay during the surrender ceremony of Japan on September 2, 1945, the other being the Winthrop Victory.

== Private use ==
In 1948, the St. Lawrence Victory was initially renamed Zagreb and in the following year Hrvatska for private operation as a passenger ship, operated by Jugoslavenska Slobodna Plovidba of Rijeka. The ship was damaged in 1961 after a collision with the Italian tanker, Fina Italia, 200 miles (320 km) off the east coast of New York. In 1967 she was sold to Adab S.A. of Geneva. The Hrvatska was managed by Dabinovic S.A. of Geneva and operated under the flag of Burundi. Later in 1967, the ship was sold to Cia. Nav. Adriatica Ltda. of San Jose, Costa Rica. In 1968 it was sold to Soc. D'Avances Commerciales S.A. as the SS Armelle registered to Somalia. She was sold once more in 1971 to Soc. de Gerance et de Transports Maritimes, Mogadiscio of Somalia before being scrapped in 1973, at Bilbao, Spain.

== See also ==
- List of Victory ships
- Type C1 ship
- Type C2.2.2 ship
- Type C2 ship
- Type C3 ship

== Sources ==
- Sawyer, L. A. and W. H. Mitchell. Victory ships and tankers: The history of the 'Victory' type cargo ships and of the tankers built in the United States of America during World War II, Cornell Maritime Press, 1974, 0-87033-182-5.
- United States Maritime Commission:
- Victory Cargo Ships
