= SS Sir Harvey Adamson =

British steamship that went missing in the Indian Ocean

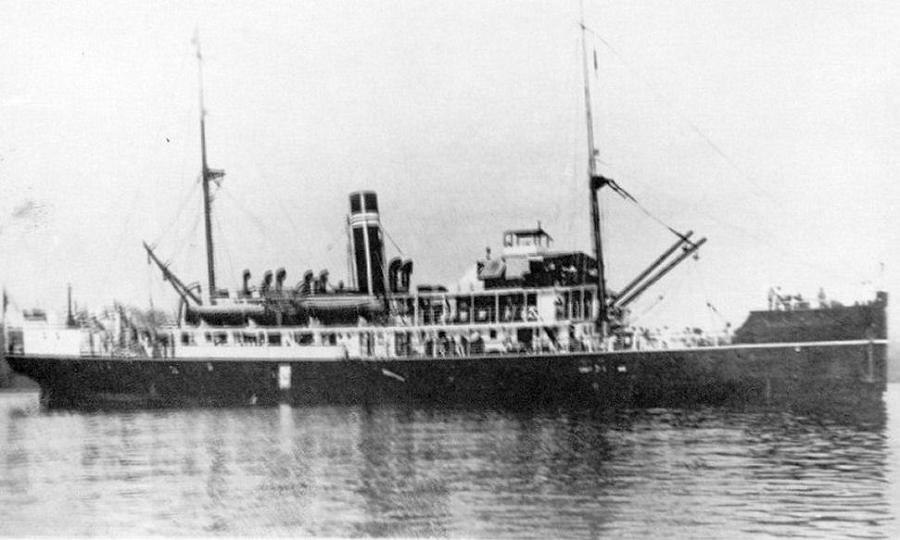
- Sir Harvey Adamson

History

United Kingdom
- Name: Sir Harvey Adamson
- Namesake: Harvey Adamson
- Owner: British India SN Co
- Port of registry: Glasgow
- Route: Rangoon – Tavoy – Mergui
- Builder: A. & J. Inglis, Glasgow
- Cost: £40,200
- Yard number: 306
- Launched: 1 October 1914
- Completed: 27 November 1914
- Identification: UK official number 136336; until 1933: code letters JHGC; by 1918: call sign MUK; by 1930: call sign GRYK
- Fate: missing without trace, 1947

General characteristics
- Type: coastal passenger ship
- Tonnage: 1,030 GRT, 528 NRT, 691 DWT
- Length: 219.7 ft (67.0 m)
- Beam: 35.1 ft (10.7 m)
- Draught: 11 ft 7 in (3.53 m)
- Depth: 11.3 ft (3.4 m)
- Decks: 1
- Installed power: 155 NHP, 700 IHP
- Propulsion: 2 × triple-expansion engines; 2 × screws
- Speed: 12 knots (22 km/h)
- Capacity: 500 passengers: 12 1st class, 12 2nd class, 476 deck class
- Crew: 64

SS Sir Harvey Adamson was a coastal passenger steamship that was built in Scotland in 1914 for the British India Steam Navigation Company (BI). She traded along the coast of Burma until 1947, shen she disappeared in a gale in the Andaman Sea. No survivor or identifiable wreckage was ever found.

== Building ==
A. & J. Inglis built the ship at Pointhouse, Glasgow, as yard number 306. She was launched on 1 October 1914 and completed in 27 November. She was named after Sir Harvey Adamson, who was lieutenant governor of Burma from 1910 until 1915. She cost £40,200.

The ship's registered length was 219.7 ft (67.0 m), her beam was 35.1 ft (10.7 m), her depth was 11.3 ft (3.4 m), and her draught was 11 ft 7 in (3.53 m). Her tonnages were 1,030 GRT, 528 NRT, and 691 DWT. She had capacity for 500 passengers: 12 in first class, 12 in second class, and 476 on deck.

The ship had twin screws, each driven by a three-cylinder triple-expansion engine. The combined power of her twin engines was rated at 155 NHP or 700 IHP, and gave her a speed of 12 knots (22 km/h).

== Career ==
BI registered the ship in Glasgow. Her UK official number was 136336 and her code letters were JHGC. By 1918 she was equipped for wireless telegraphy, and her call sign was MUK. By 1930 her this was superseded by the four-letter call sign GRYK, which in 1934 superseded her code letters.

Sir Harvey Adamson's regular route was along the coast of Tenasserim (now Tanintharyi Region and Mon State). She ran between Rangoon (now Yangon) in the north and Mergui (now Myeik) in the south, via Tavoy (now Dawei).

=== First World War ===
In September 1915 she was requisitioned for First World War service. Sources differ as to whether she served as a patrol vessel, or a troop ship for the Indian Expeditionary Forces. According to one source, in 1916 she was relieved by a warship and reverted to her commercial service. According to another, in May 1917 she became subject to the Liner Requisition Scheme, and towed inland waterway craft from Bombay to Basra for service on the Tigris–Euphrates river system in the Mesopotamian campaign.

=== Second World War ===
In March 1940 Sir Harvey Adamson served under the Liner Division. In December 1941 Japan invaded Burma. In January 1942 she was requisitioned as a personnel and military store ship for the evacuation of Mergui (Myeik). In May 1942, just before Burma fell, Sir Harvey Adamson evacuated refugees from Akyab (now Sittwe) in western Burma to India. From February 1943 the Royal Air Force used her as a storage ship for high-octane fuel.

=== Loss ===
Last reported position, 1830 hrs, 18 April 1947

In 1945 the Japanese occupation of Burma ended, and in 1946 Sir Harvey Adamson returned to her commercial service. Lloyd's Register inspected her in December 1946, and renewed her 100A1 rating for six months.

On 17 April 1947 Sir Harvey Adamson left Rangoon carrying 64 crew and 205 passengers. At 1610 hrs the next day she radioed that she would be late reaching Tavoy (Dawei), due to a south-easterly gale and heavy rain. At 1830 hrs she radioed that her position was 13°13′N 97°36′E. Nothing was heard from her thereafter, and an extensive search found neither survivors nor identifiable wreckage. On 5 May she was declared lost.

A Court of Inquiry was held. On 29 June 1947 it surmised that the ship had sought shelter among the Middle Moscos Islands, and had struck one of the Second World War mines known to remain in that area. However, in the absence of any evidence, this conclusion remains conjecture.

== Bibliography ==
- Haws, Duncan (1987). British India S.N. Co. Merchant Fleets. Vol. 11. Burwash: Travel Creatours Ltd Publications. ISBN 0-946378-07-X.
- Lloyd's Register of Shipping. Vol. II.–Steamers. London: Lloyd's Register of Shipping. 1917 – via Internet Archive.
- Lloyd's Register of Shipping. Vol. II.–Steamers. London: Lloyd's Register of Shipping. 1919 – via Internet Archive.
- Lloyd's Register of Shipping. Vol. II.–Steamers and motorships of 300 tons gross and over. London: Lloyd's Register of Shipping. 1934 – via Southampton City Council.
- Lloyd's Register of Shipping. Vol. Steamers and motorships of 300 tons gross and over, Steamers and motorships under 300 tons, trawlers, tugs, dredgers, &c, sailing vessels, list of ship owners, &c. London: Lloyd's Register of Shipping. 1946 – via Internet Archive.
- The Marconi Press Agency Ltd (1918). The Year Book of Wireless Telegraphy and Telephony. London: The Wireless Press, Ltd.
- Mercantile Navy List. London. 1930 – via Crew List Index Project.
