= Ocean ship =

Class of cargo ships built during WWII

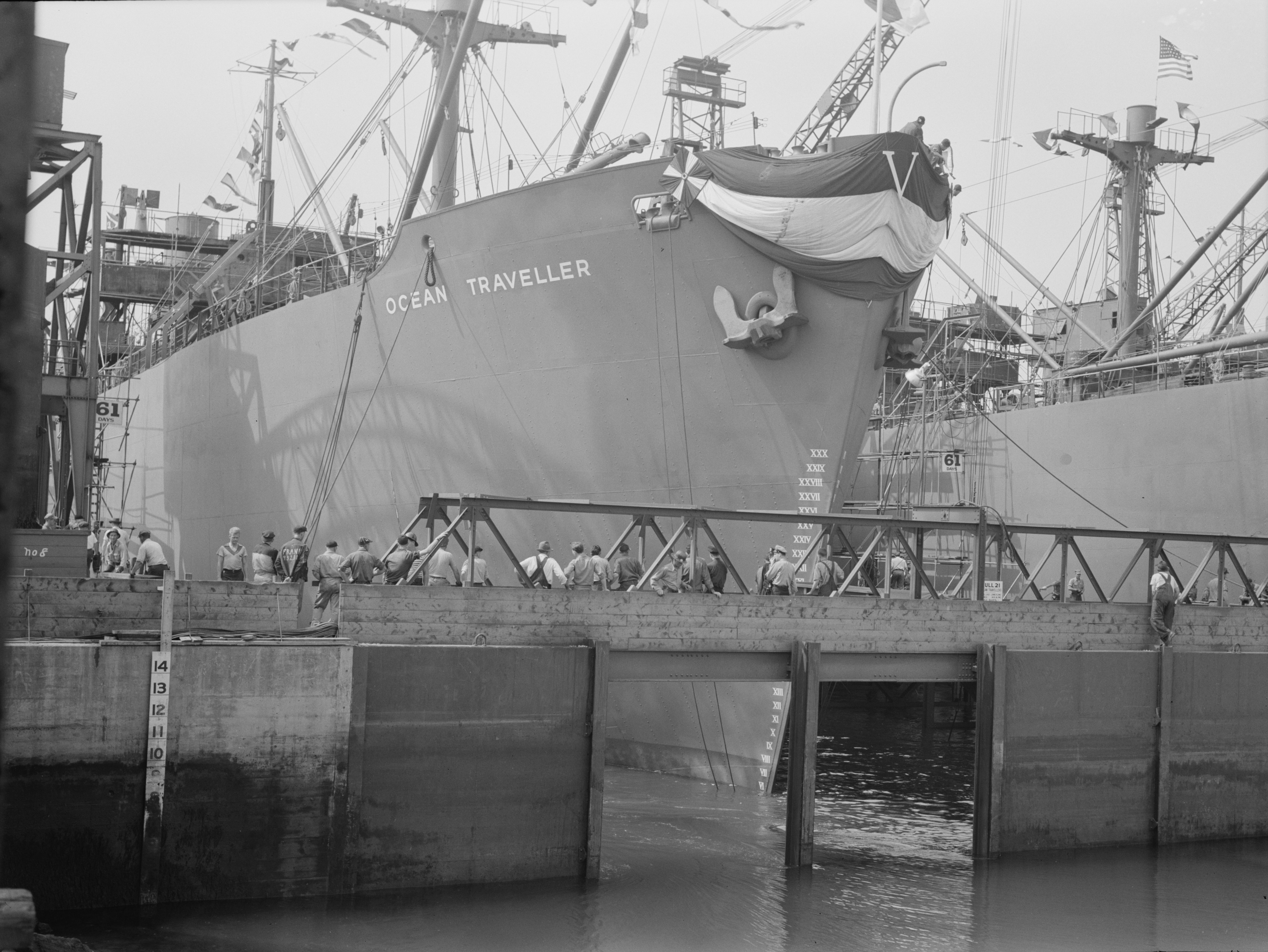
- Ocean Traveller launch, August, 1942

Class overview
- Builders: Permanente Metals Corporation, Richmond, California; Todd-Bath Iron Shipbuilding, South Portland, Maine
- Operators: Ministry of War Transport
- Built: October 1941 – November 1942
- In service: 1941–1985 (Note: Last confirmed scrapping, two ships may have been in service until the 1990s.)
- Planned: 60
- Completed: 60
- Lost: 18 (to enemy action); 8 (accidents)
- Scrapped: 33 (including two ships lost to enemy action and subsequently salvaged)

General characteristics
- Type: Cargo ship
- Tonnage: 7,174 GRT
- Length: 416 ft (127 m)
- Beam: 57 ft (17 m)
- Installed power: Triple expansion steam engine
- Speed: 11 knots (20 km/h)

The Ocean ships were a class of sixty cargo ships built in the United States by Todd Shipyards Corporation during the Second World War for the British Ministry of War Transport under contracts let by the British Purchasing Commission. Eighteen were lost to enemy action and eight to accidents; survivors were sold postwar into merchant service.

To expedite production, the type was based on an existing design, later adapted to become the Liberty ship. Yards constructed to build the Oceans went immediately into production of Liberty hulls. Before and during construction the ships are occasionally mentioned as "British Victory" or victory ships as distinct from the United States variant known as the Liberty ship.

== Contract and yards ==
On 19 December 1940 John D. Reilly, president of Todd Shipyards Corporation, announced that contracts totaling US$100,000,000 had been signed between two Todd affiliates and the British Purchasing Commission for the construction of sixty cargo ships with thirty to be built at Todd California Shipbuilding Corporation in Richmond, California and thirty at Todd-Bath Iron Shipbuilding, South Portland, Maine. The ships, each estimated at $1,600,000, were to be built in entirely new yards with initial yard construction started 20 December 1940 and yard completion planned in four months with the first keels laid two and a half months after start of the yard construction. Each yard was estimated to need 5,000 or more workers. Henry J. Kaiser, then head of Seattle-Tacoma Shipbuilding Corporation, was to become president of the Todd California entity and William S. Newell, then head of Bath Iron Works, president of the Todd-Bath Iron Shipbuilding entity.

On 14 January 1941 groundbreaking took place for the new yard on a 48-acre site at Richmond, with the keel for the first Ocean ship laid seventy-eight days later on 14 April. With a contract from the Maritime Commission for twenty-four emergency type ships of the Liberty class, Kaiser began construction of six ways at his nearby Richmond Shipbuilding Corporation yards four days later.

The sunken basins in the Maine yard were the first in the world used to mass-produce ships.

== Description ==
The Oceans were of steel construction with a welded hull to a design by naval architects Gibbs & Cox built to British Lloyd's requirements and specifications under the inspection Lloyd's Chief Surveyor in the United States. The design was based on the British "Sunderland Tramp", which originated in 1879 (Note: "In the autumn of 1940, Britain had placed an order for sixty tramp steamers of about 10,000 ton deadweight capacity. The original design came from Sunderland, England, and originated in 1879. This style of vessel had been produced until the mid-1930s, the last one being SS Dorrington Court. The adaptation was from a wartime plan entitled, "The Northeast Coast, Open Shelter Deck Steamer," and generally known as "The North Sands 9300 Tonner." The scantlings allowed for an 18-inch increase in draft upon the closure of all tonnage openings and provided a closed shelter deck vessel of 10,100 deadweight tons. The vessels were to be designated as Ocean-class ships.") and was last built 1939 by J.L. Thompson and Sons North Sands shipyard becoming the basis for the Ocean class of freighter. The 1940 contract for the Ocean type called for them to be built in United States yards.

They were all nominally 7,174 GRT with a length of 416 ft (127 m) and a beam of 57 ft (17 m). The ships were powered by triple-expansion steam engines with cylinders of 24.5 inches, 37 inches, and 70 inches bore and with 48-inch stroke, supplied with steam from three single-ended Scotch-type coal-fired boilers placed forward of the engine for a design speed of 11 knots. This plant is described as being a modern version of one known when they first went to sea to marine engineers age forty-five or older and was chosen for the emergency ships by both the British Purchasing Commission and the United States Maritime Commission in part due to availability of repair in almost any port and so as to not compete with the surge in orders for the more modern geared turbine systems in demand for Naval and other construction. Electrical power was to be provided by single-cylinder, vertical steam engines powering two 25 kW generators.

Emergency shipbuilding programs in Canada and the United States required over 700 standardized triple-expansion steam engines to be built in seventeen plants by a number of companies. A design of the North Eastern Marine Engineering Co., Ltd., of Wallsend-on-Tyne, England was modified and standardized for mass North American production by the General Machinery Corporation with the British Purchasing Commission placing an order for sixty of the engines to power the Ocean ships with General Machinery Corporation which went in production as its standardized design and patterns were being sent to other builders. General Machinery delivered its first engine to Todd California Shipbuilding Corporation for installation in Ocean Vanguard.

All the ships had "Ocean" names, but at the time of construction were sometimes referred to as British Victory ships as in the Berkeley Daily Gazette announcement on May 20, 1942 that "the Richmond Shipyards today are delivering a finished British victory ship—the Ocean Vengeance" or the Pacific Marine Review article in its January 1943 issue noting "there had been one delivery of a Liberty ship from a Pacific Coast shipyard and there were three shipyards building Libertys and one building Victory ships for Britain" in which there is a clear distinction between the United States' "Liberty" construction and British "Victory" construction. One of the early "classifications" of the ship type had been as a "Liberty V" design, a term not apparently later used in a professional journal's references. (Note: Throughout the construction program occasional references can be found mentioning the British victory or Victory ships along with the "victory fleet" that includes all the emergency construction such as the U.S. Liberty type. It appears it was a generic term or sometimes specific to the sixty British ships until the program producing the specific type we know as the Victory ship began to monopolize the term in early 1943.)

== History ==
=== Todd-California Shipbuilding ===
Thirty of the Oceans were built at Richmond, California's Yard #1 by Todd-California Shipbuilding, intended specifically to build "Ocean" ships for the British. All Oceans with name beginning with the letter "V" were built by means of electric welding at Richmond, California.

The first Ocean type vessel launched was Ocean Vanguard on 16 August 1941. The launch, about two months earlier than scheduled, was a significant event with the ship's bows decorated with flags of the two nations during which Rear Admiral Emory S. Land, Chairman of the Maritime Commission, delivering an address and his wife sponsoring the ship and Sir Arthur Salter representing the British purchaser and Henry J. Kaiser representing the builder.

=== Todd-Bath Iron Shipbuilding construction ===
Thirty of the ships were built at Todd-Bath Iron Shipbuilding, South Portland, Maine, an emergency yard built by Todd, Bath Iron Works and Kaiser shipbuilding specifically to construct the "Ocean" ships for Britain, as yard hull numbers 1–30. The first vessel from this yard was Ocean Liberty launched 20 December 1941.

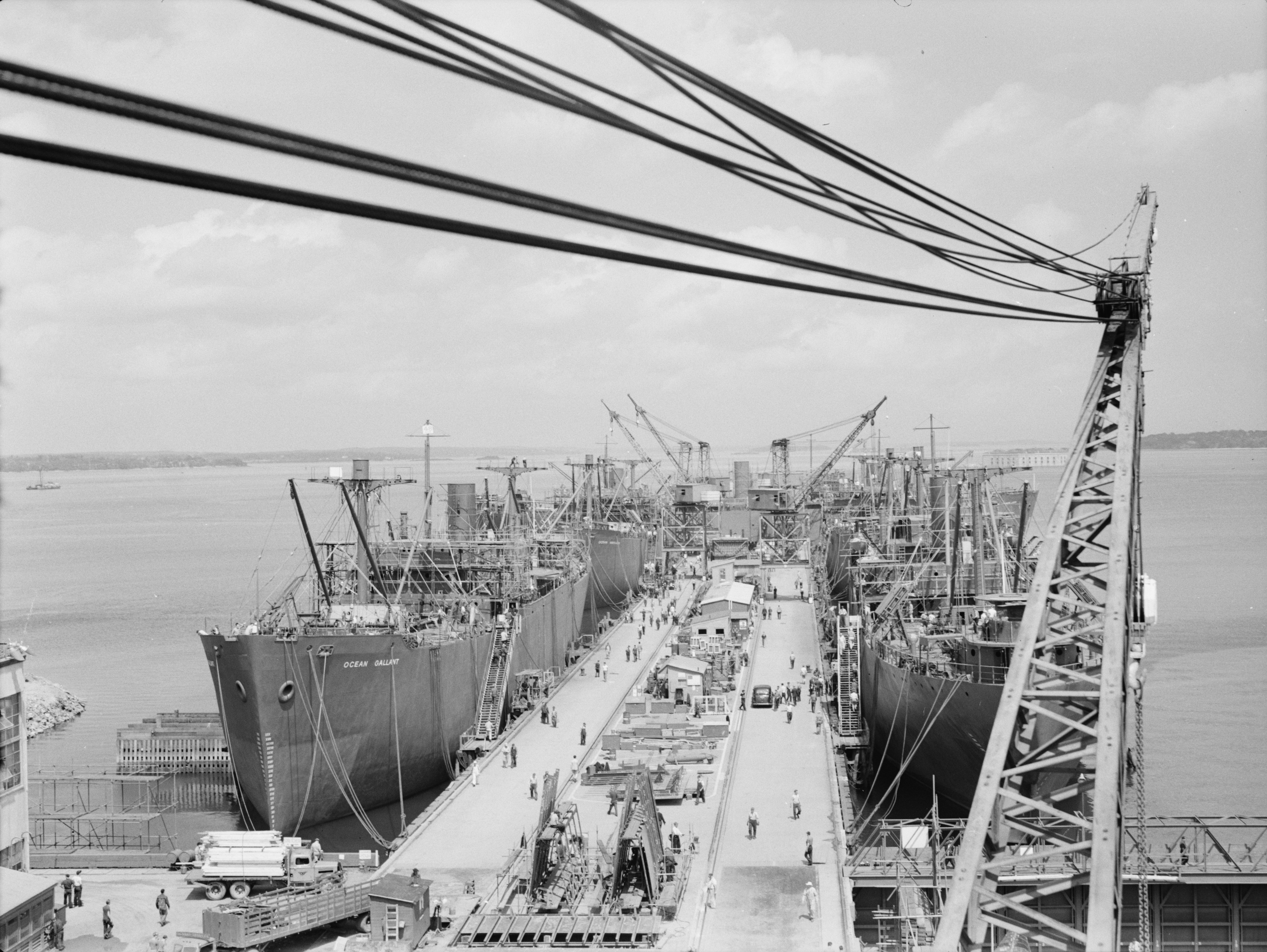
Mass launching of five Ocean ships on August 16, 1942

On Sunday, 16 August 1942, five of the Ocean ships were launched on one day as the Liberty ship SS Ethan Allen was launched at Todd's adjacent South Portland Shipbuilding Corporation and the destroyers USS Conway and USS Cony were launched at nearby Bath Iron Works Corporation for the largest mass launch at that time in the war shipbuilding program and largest in Maine's history. The five Ocean ships launched that day were hulls 19–24: Ocean Wayfarer, Ocean Stranger, Ocean Traveller, Ocean Seaman, and Ocean Gallant, with sponsors being wives of U.S. Senators, a Todd executive and directors of the British Ministry of Shipping. The ships, launched by flooding the construction basins and towing them to the fitting out docks, were all launched within fifteen minutes. The last three of the thirty ships from the Todd yard, Ocean Crusader, Ocean Gypsy, and Ocean Glory, were launched 18 October 1942, whereupon the basins were to be used to build additional Liberty hulls with four already under construction.

Five Ocean ships were transferred to foreign governments during the war.

Country	Ship
Belgium	Ocean Veteran
Netherlands	Ocean Athlete; Ocean Merchant; Ocean Victory
Poland	Ocean Hope

== Lost to enemy action ==
Eighteen ships were lost to enemy action during the war, although two were later salvaged and returned to service.

Ship	Details
Ocean Courage	Torpedoed on 15 January 1943 and sunk by U-182 about 200 miles south of the Cape Verde Islands. 10°52′N 23°28′W.
Ocean Crusader	Torpedoed on 26 November 1942 and sunk by U-262 about 330 miles northeast of St. John’s, Newfoundland 50°30′N 45°30′W with the loss of all hands.
Ocean Freedom	Bombed on 13 March 1943 by the Luftwaffe and sunk at Murmansk. Refloated on 1 June 1943 and beached in the Kola Inlet where she was scrapped.
Ocean Honour	Torpedoed and sunk by Japanese submarine I-29 on 16 September 1942 at 12°48′N 50°50′E
Ocean Justice	Torpedoed and sunk by U-505 on 6 November 1942 east of Trinidad at 10°06′N 60°00′W.
Ocean Hunter	Torpedoed and sunk by Luftwaffe aircraft on 10 January 1944 at 36°07′N 00°11′W.
Ocean Might	Torpedoed and sunk by U-109 on 2 September 1942 at 00°57′N 04°11′W.
Ocean Peace	Bombed and sunk by aircraft on 12 July 1943 off Sicily at 36°55′N 15°13′E.
Ocean Seaman	Torpedoed while in convoy from North Africa to Gibraltar on 15 March 1943 by U-380 at 36°55′N 01°59′E. Towed by USS Paul Jones and beached at Algiers, Algeria but declared a total loss.
Ocean Vagabond	Torpedoed and sunk by U-186 at 57°17′N 20°11′W on 10 January 1943.
Ocean Vanguard	Torpedoed on 17 September 1942 and sunk by U-515 at 10°43′N 60°11′W.
Ocean Venture	Torpedoed on 8 February 1942 and sunk by U-108 at 37°05′N 74°46′W.
Ocean Venus	Torpedoed and sunk by U-564 on 3 May 1942 at 28°23′N 80°21′W.
Ocean Viking	Struck a mine on 11 October 1943 at 40°19′N 16°59′E and badly damaged. Scuttled as a breakwater at Bari, Italy in January 1944. Salvaged in 1947, repaired and returned to service.
Ocean Vintage	Torpedoed by Japanese submarine I-27 on 22 October 1942 sinking at 21°37′N 60°06′E.
Ocean Virtue	Bombed by the Luftwaffe off Augusta, Sicily, 21 July 1943, caught fire and sank. Salvaged later that year and later rebuilt as a cargo liner.
Ocean Voice	Torpedoed on 22 September 1942 and sunk by German submarine U-435 at 71°23′N 11°01′W.
Ocean Voyager	Bombed by the Luftwaffe on 19 March 1943 off Tripoli, Libya. This ship was sunk in the first mass attack by the Luftwaffe using Motobomba circular torpedoes. 72 of the circling torpedoes were dropped by parachute at medium altitude from Junkers Ju 88s into Tripoli Harbor. Captain Duncan MacKellar was killed outright when one of the circling torpedoes struck the docked ship, along with six others, and 12 were seriously injured prior to the massive explosion the next day which sank her. Several awards for bravery resulted from the heroic actions of crew following the initial attack and fire.

Eight ships were lost in accidents postwar.

Postwar losses
Ship	Details
Ocean Liberty	On 14 May 1966, the Greek cargo ship, Newgrove, ran aground at Puerto Padre, Cuba. The wreck was abandoned to the Cuban Government.
Ocean Pride	In 1966, Susana K L suffered a fire in her boiler room, and was subsequently scrapped.
Ocean Traveller	In 1959, Cape Corso was involved in a collision and grounding. She was subsequently scrapped.
Ocean Verity	On 5 November 1961, Clan Keith sank after hitting rocks off Cap Bon, Tunisia.
Ocean Viceroy	On 13 November 1966, cargo on board Omonia II caught fire when the ship was berthed at Amsterdam, Netherlands. The ship was subsequently scrapped.
Ocean Vigil	On 3 December 1963, Roumeli was grounded after leaving drydock at Gijón, Spain. She was subsequently beached and scrapped.
Ocean Wanderer	On 2 November 1962, Santa Irene was wrecked on the Los Cabezos Shoal, off Tarifa, Spain.
Ocean Wayfarer	In 1953, Clan Macquarrie grounded off Troon, Scotland in a storm and was subsequently scrapped.

The Oceans served until the mid-1980s, with Ocean Athlete being scrapped in 1985. Ocean Merchant was on Chinese shipping registers as Zhan Dou 26 until 1992.
