= SS Ocean Victory =

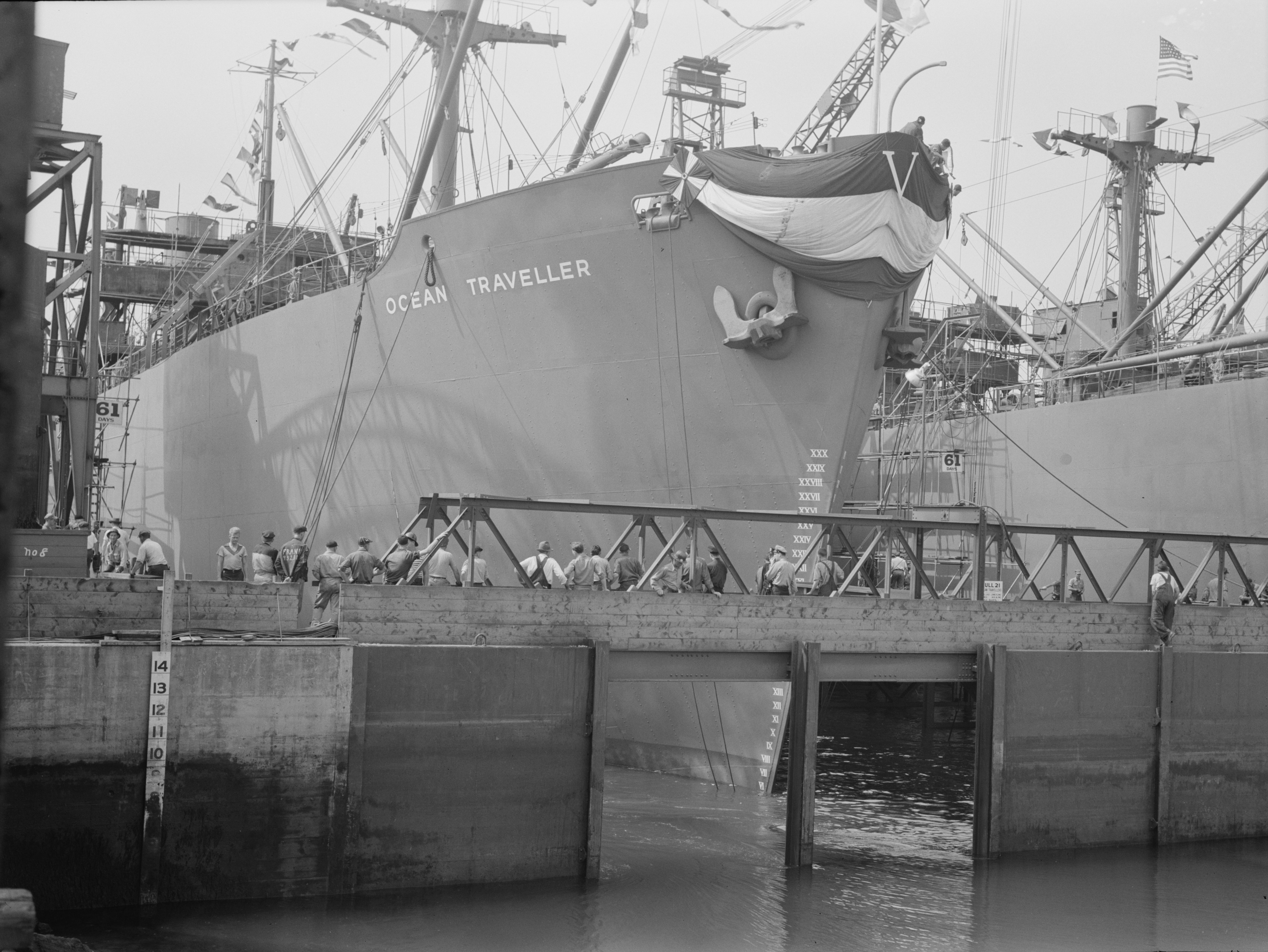
- Sister ship Ocean Traveller launched August, 1942

History
- Name: Ocean Victory (1942-43); Jan Steen (1943-1947); Amstelveen (1947-1959); Polly (1959-1963)
- Owner: Ministry of War Transport (1942-43); Dutch Government (1943-1947); NV Reederij Amsterdam (1947-1959); Eddie Steamship Co (1959-1963)
- Operator: McCowan & Cross (1942-43); NV Stoomvaart Maatschappij Nederland (1943-1947); NV Reederij Amsterdam (1947-1959); Eddie Steamship Co (1959-1963)
- Port of registry: (United Kingdom) Liverpool (1943); (Netherlands) Den Haag (1943-1947); (Netherlands) Amsterdam (1947-1959); Hong Kong (1959-1963)
- Builder: Kaiser Richmond No. 1 Yard
- Way number: No. 1 Yard
- Launched: 27 June 1942
- Completed: July 1942
- Identification: Code Letters BDYG (1943); Code Letters PEZR (1943-59); United Kingdom Official Number 165837 (1943)
- Fate: Scrapped

General characteristics
- Class & type: Ocean ship
- Tonnage: 7,174 GRT; 4,272 NRT
- Length: 425 ft 1 in (129.57 m)
- Beam: 57 ft 0 in (17.37 m)
- Draught: 26 ft 11 in (8.20 m)
- Depth: 34 ft 8 in (10.57 m)
- Installed power: Triple expansion steam engine
- Propulsion: Screw propeller
- Speed: 11 knots (20 km/h)

Ocean Victory was a 7,174 GRT cargo ship that was built in 1942 for the British Ministry of War Transport (MoWT). In 1943, she was transferred to the Dutch Government and renamed Jan Steen. In 1946, she was sold into merchant service and renamed Amstelveen. A sale to Hong Kong in 1959 saw her renamed Polly. She served until 1963 when she was scrapped.

== Description ==
The ship was an Ocean ship. She was built by Permanente Metals Corporation, Richmond, California, US in Kaiser Richmond No. 1 Yard; launched from their Yard No.1 on 27 June 1942, and was completed in July 1942.

The ship was 425 feet 1 inch (129.57 m) long, with a beam of 57 feet (17.37 m). She had a depth of 34 feet 8 inches (10.57 m) and a draught of 26 feet 11 inches (8.20 m). The ship was powered by a triple expansion steam engine which had cylinders of 24 1/2 inches (62 cm), 37 inches (94 cm) and 70 inches (180 cm) diameter by 48 inches (120 cm) stroke. The engine, built by General Machinery Corporation, Hamilton, Ohio, could propel her at 11 knots (20 km/h).

== History ==
Ocean Victory was completed in July 1942. She was placed under the management of McCowan and Cross, Liverpool. Her port of registry was Liverpool. Ocean Victory was allocated the Code Letters BDYG and the United Kingdom Official Number 165837. She was a member of a number of convoys during the Second World War.

KMS 3G

Convoy KMS 3G departed the Clyde on 8 November 1942 bound for Gibraltar. Ocean Victory was a member of this convoy.

MKS 4

Convoy MKS 4 departed Bône, Algeria on 22 December 1942 and arrived at Liverpool on 6 January 1943. Ocean Victory was bound for Swansea.

In 1943, Ocean Victory was transferred to the Dutch government-in-exile. She was renamed Jan Steen and placed under the management of NV Stoomvaart Maatschappij Nederland. The Code Letters PEZR were allocated.

Jan Steen was a member of a number of convoys during the Second World War.

MKS 51

Convoy MKS 51 departed Bône on 6 June 1944 bound for the United Kingdom. Jan Steen had started her voyage at Alexandria, Egypt and was bound for the United Kingdom carrying general cargo and mail. The convoy departed Gibraltar on 9 June 1944.

MKS 58

Convoy MKS 58 departed Alexandria on 8 August 1944 bound for the United Kingdom. Jan Steen joined the convoy at Bizerta, Tunisia and left it at Algiers, Algeria.

MKS 62

Convoy MKS 62 departed Port Said, Egypt on 16 September 1944 bound for the United Kingdom. Jan Steen joined the convoy at Augusta, Italy and left it at Algiers.

MKS 78G

Convoy MKS 78G departed Gibraltar on 21 January 1945 bound for the United Kingdom. Jan Steen was a member of this convoy, she was carrying a cargo of oranges.

== Post-war, and fate ==
On 1 January 1947, Jan Steen was involved in a collision with SS Caritas I in the River Scheldt near Vlissingen. Caritas I was beached but broke in two and sank the next day. Jan Steen was sold to NV Reederij Amsterdam in 1947, and was renamed Amstelveen. In 1959, Amstelveen was sold to Eddie Steamship Co Ltd, Hong Kong and was renamed Polly. She served until 1963 when she was scrapped at Kaohsiung, Taiwan.
