= Operation Title =

1942 Allied attack on German battleship Tirpitz

- Part of the Second World War
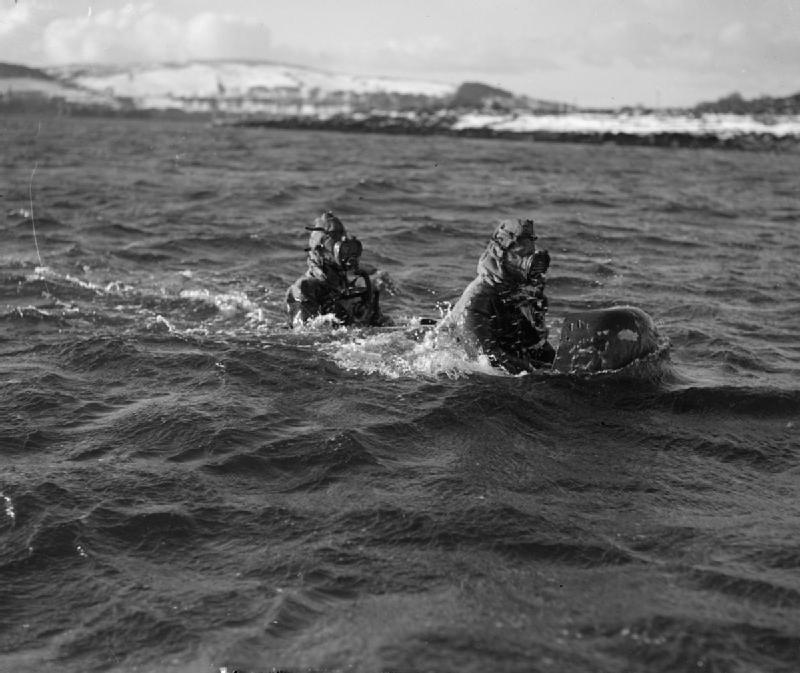
- A British Chariot manned torpedo team during a daytime training exercise
| Date | 26 October – 5 November 1942 |
| Location | Trondheimsfjorden area, Norway |
| Result | Allied failure |

Belligerents
| United Kingdom; Norway | Germany |

Commanders and leaders
| (Norway) Leif Larsen (United Kingdom) William Brewster | (Nazi Germany) Karl Topp |

Strength
| 2 Chariot manned torpedoes Small boat Arthur | Battleship Tirpitz; Patrol boats |

Casualties and losses
| 1 man captured (later executed); 2 Chariot manned torpedoes lost Arthur scuttled | 1 killed |

Operation Title was an unsuccessful Allied attack on the German battleship Tirpitz during the Battle of the Atlantic in World War II. It involved two British Chariot manned torpedoes that were transported close to the battleship's anchorage in Trondheimsfjorden (the Trondheim Fjord) in occupied Norway, by a Norwegian-crewed boat between 26 and 31 October 1942. The attack was abandoned following the accidental loss of both Chariots during the evening of 31 October.

The Allies considered Tirpitz to be a major threat to their shipping, and British Prime Minister Winston Churchill directed that priority be placed on destroying the battleship. Several Royal Air Force (RAF) heavy bomber raids against Tirpitz failed to inflict any damage, and it was decided to use Royal Navy midget submarines instead. Operation Title involved a pair of two-man British Chariot crews, two British support personnel and four members of the Norwegian resistance. They were transported to Norway on board a small boat named Arthur that had been modified to covertly carry the Chariots and their crews. Arthur suffered mechanical problems during the voyage to Trondheimsfjorden, causing delays. Its captain, Leif Larsen, used forged documents to bluff his way through German defences near the mouth of the fjord.

Both Chariots were lost when bad weather caused them to detach from Arthur on 31 October, shortly before the attack was to have begun. This forced the operation to be abandoned. It was not possible for the Allied boat to return to the sea due to German security measures, and Arthur was scuttled. The Allied personnel attempted to escape overland to neutral Sweden, and all but one reached Sweden on 5 November. The other – a British serviceman – was taken prisoner by German forces and murdered on 19 January 1943. Historians regard Operation Title as a skilful attack that failed due to bad luck and faulty workmanship. The British attacked Tirpitz again in September 1943 (Operation Source) using a different type of midget submarine; this operation caused severe damage to the battleship. The Royal Navy conducted several air raids against Tirpitz between April and August 1944, with mixed results. She was crippled by a RAF heavy bomber attack in September 1944 and sunk by another such raid in November that year.

== Background ==
=== Strategic situation ===
Before the outbreak of World War II the Kriegsmarine (German Navy) developed plans to attack Allied merchant shipping in the event of war. The navy's commander, Grand Admiral Erich Raeder, believed that battleships and cruisers were a key part of this strategy. As a result, the Scharnhorst and Bismarck-class battleships that were constructed in the late 1930s and early 1940s were designed to be capable of making long-range anti-shipping raids into the Atlantic Ocean. Tirpitz was the second of the two Bismarck-class vessels and was launched in April 1939 and commissioned on 25 February 1941.

The Kriegsmarine made two battleship raids against Allied convoys in the Atlantic Ocean in early 1941. The battleships Gneisenau and Scharnhorst conducted Operation Berlin between January and March 1941. During this raid, they sailed from Germany, attacked Allied shipping, and returned to occupied France. A second raid, Operation Rheinübung, was attempted in May and involved the battleship Bismarck and heavy cruiser Prinz Eugen. While the German ships destroyed the British battlecruiser HMS Hood on 24 May, Bismarck was crippled by Fairey Swordfish torpedo bombers from the British aircraft carrier HMS Ark Royal and sank on 27 May after being bombarded by several British battleships from the Home Fleet. The loss of Bismarck left Tirpitz as Germany's only full-sized battleship.

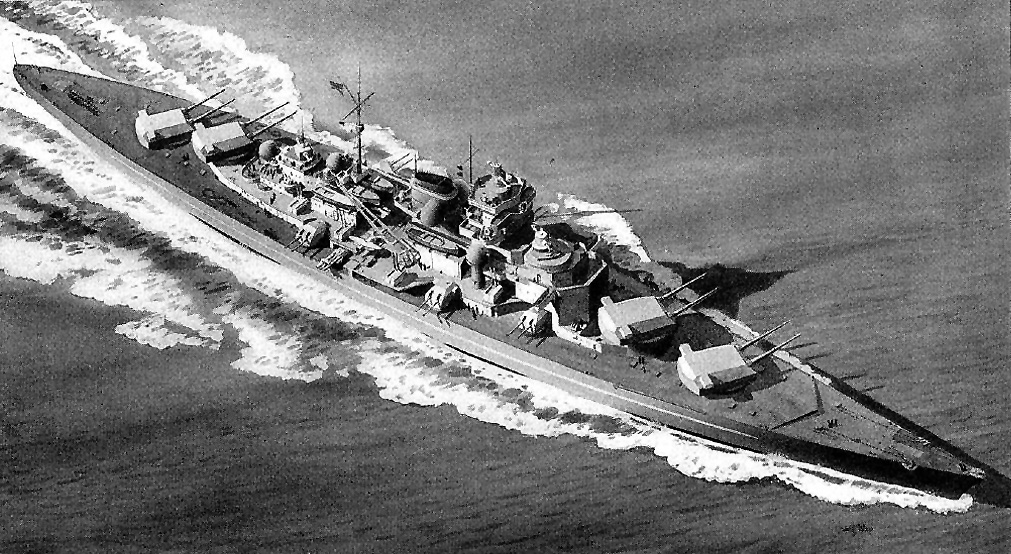
A recognition drawing of Tirpitz as she appeared in 1942

After the German invasion of the Soviet Union on 22 June 1941 the Allies began sending convoys loaded with supplies through the Norwegian Sea and Arctic Ocean to ports in northern Russia. The Arctic convoys that were dispatched during 1941 and early 1942 were lightly opposed. Harsh weather conditions, including extreme cold, heavy seas and gales, made air and naval operations in the area difficult for all of the combatants.

In December 1941 the German military began transferring substantial naval and air forces to northern Norway, which they had occupied since early 1940. The forces sent to Norway were tasked with attacking the Arctic convoys as well as defending the area from an invasion. At this time the German dictator Adolf Hitler wrongly believed the Allies intended to invade Norway. On 12 January 1942 Hitler ordered Tirpitz to be transferred from Germany to Fættenfjord in Norway, which is located to the east of the city of Trondheim and forms part of Trondheimsfjorden (the Trondheim Fjord). The battleship and two escorting destroyers departed Wilhelmshaven in Germany on 14 January and arrived in Trondheim on 16 January. She was to form the main element of a powerful battle group once other German warships arrived in the area. Kapitän zur See Karl Topp commanded Tirpitz at this time.

The Allies learned of Tirpitz's arrival at Trondheim on 17 January from Ultra intelligence obtained by decrypting intercepted German radio signals. British photo reconnaissance aircraft located the battleship there on 23 January. Sorties were regularly flown over the Trondheim area to monitor her. Due to the threat Tirpitz posed to Allied convoys in the Atlantic Ocean and the Norwegian Sea, British Prime Minister Winston Churchill directed on 25 January that "the destruction or even crippling of this ship is the greatest event at sea at the present time. No other target is comparable to it". The Allies needed to keep a powerful force of warships with the Home Fleet to counter the threat Tirpitz posed and capital ships accompanied most convoys part of the way to the Soviet Union.

=== Early attacks on Fættenfjord ===
The battleship was relatively safe from air and naval attack at Fættenfjord, as it was distant from British bases and well protected. The defences against air attack included anti-aircraft guns on nearby ships and batteries on the shore as well as equipment that could quickly generate a protective smoke screen. Torpedo nets were installed around Tirpitz's anchorage to counter torpedo attacks and patrol boats operated in Trondheimsfjorden.

The Royal Air Force's (RAF) Bomber Command was directed to attack Tirpitz at Fættenfjord using heavy bombers. The first such raid was made on the night of 28/29 January 1942 by 16 heavy bombers; no damage was inflicted. On 6 March Tirpitz and three escorting destroyers departed Fættenfjord to attack two Allied convoys that were passing through the Norwegian Sea. These convoys were escorted by elements of the British Home Fleet, and planes operating from the aircraft carrier HMS Victorious made an unsuccessful attack on Tirpitz on 9 March. Following this operation Hitler directed that Tirpitz was to not attempt further attacks against convoys unless it was first confirmed that no aircraft carriers were nearby.

RAF heavy bombers repeatedly attacked Tirpitz at Fættenfjord during March and April 1942. Raids were conducted on the nights of 30/31 March, 27/28 April and 28/29 April. No damage was caused to the battleship, and 12 British aircraft were destroyed. These raids had to be conducted at night as the German air defences in the region made daytime attacks too risky. The lengthening duration of daylight as spring wore on led to a decision to not make further heavy bomber attacks until autumn.

After Tirpitz arrived in Norway the British deputy commander of the Shetland Bus covert transport unit, Sub Lieutenant David Howarth, developed a proposal to attack the battleship. This force was jointly administered by the British MI6 and Special Operations Executive (SOE) intelligence agencies, and comprised small Norwegian-crewed ships that smuggled personnel and supplies between Norway and the UK. Howarth proposed arming one of the Shetland Bus ships with two torpedoes fitted below its hull. The ship would infiltrate Trondheimsfjorden and fire the torpedoes as it passed Tirpitz's anchorage. Howarth discussed this scheme with the highly experienced Shetland Bus captain Leif Larsen, who offered to command the attack. The Shetland Bus force's commanding officer Major Leslie Mitchell submitted the plan to the Admiralty (the government department which oversaw the Royal Navy), but nothing came of it.

On 2 July 1942 Tirpitz and several other German warships sailed from Fættenfjord to Altenfjord in northern Norway to be held ready to attack Convoy PQ 17. The head of the Royal Navy, Admiral of the Fleet Dudley Pound, ordered the ships sailing in the convoy to scatter and proceed to the USSR individually after learning of the German force's presence. Tirpitz sortied on 5 July, but was ordered by Hitler to return to Altenfjord the next day after a British aircraft carrier was detected. German aircraft and submarines inflicted heavy losses on the ships that had sailed with PQ 17; twenty-four were destroyed.

Following the operation against Convoy PQ 17 Tirpitz sailed to Bogen Bay near Narvik in northern Norway, arriving there on 8 July. She remained at this anchorage for several months. In September it was decided to return the battleship to Fættenfjord to undertake maintenance. During the period Tirpitz was at Narvik the British judged that she would return to Fættenfjord as the anti-aircraft batteries there remained in place.

=== Development of the Chariot ===
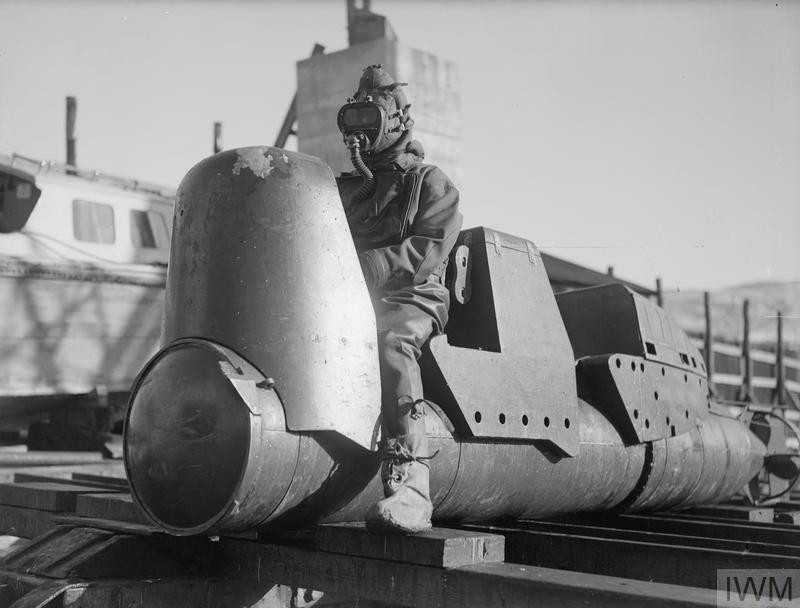
A Chariot (minus its warhead) with its commander

The destruction of Convoy PQ 17 led to an increased determination among the Allied leadership to neutralise Tirpitz. As the RAF raids had failed, the Admiralty came to believe that attacks against the battleship at its anchorage using small submarines should be attempted. It was not possible to use full-sized submarines as the shallow depth of Fættenfjord meant that they would likely be detected before an attack could be made.

At this time the Royal Navy had two types of small submarines under development, the Chariot manned torpedo and the X-class midget submarines. Development of both types had begun in 1940. Manned torpedoes were used by the Regia Marina (Italian Navy) to damage two British battleships, while at anchor at their base in Alexandria, Egypt, on 19 December 1941. Following this attack Churchill asked the Chiefs of Staff Committee to explain "what is being done to emulate the exploits of the Italians in Alexandria Harbour". By the start of February 1942 the commander of the Royal Navy's submarine service, Admiral Max Horton, was developing plans to use manned torpedoes and midget submarines.

Trials of the first Chariot manned torpedo began in April 1942. Volunteers to operate Chariots and midget submarines were also sought in early 1942. The appeal issued by Horton noted that the volunteers would undertake "hazardous service" but, to preserve secrecy, did not specify what this would involve. By April 1942 30 men had been recruited.

The Chariot had a crew of two, a commander and a number two. It was 22 feet (6.7 m) long and weighed 3,500 pounds (1,600 kg). Its single propeller was powered by an electric battery which gave a maximum range of 18 miles (29 km) when travelling at 3 knots (5.6 km/h; 3.5 mph). The craft were armed with a single detachable warhead containing 600 pounds (270 kg) of explosives. It was intended that Chariots would be transported by a ship to near their target. The crew would then penetrate the enemy defences, which were expected to include metal anti-submarine and anti-torpedo nets. Once done, the number two would attach the warhead to the target ship's hull using magnets. The warheads had a time-delay fuse to allow the Chariot crews to escape before it detonated. As the Chariot did not have enough range to return to its mother ship, it was intended their crews would head for the shore after completing their attack and escape overland to neutral Sweden.

Extensive trials and other developmental work were conducted during 1942 to perfect the Chariot's design and develop tactics for using them in combat. The crews were also put through gruelling training to prepare them to make attacks and escape overland. Despite the difficulty of the training and the risky nature of the Chariots' intended missions, few of the volunteers withdrew.

== Preparations ==
=== Plans ===
Work on a plan to attack Tirpitz at Fættenfjord using Chariots began in mid-June 1942. It was developed by Captain Edward Gibson (who was also the Baron Ashbourne) and the head of the Norwegian Section of the SOE, Lieutenant Colonel John Wilson. The SOE was a covert British service responsible for sabotage attacks in occupied Europe. It was realised at an early stage of planning that the Norwegian resistance would also need to be involved. A network of Norwegian SOE agents, code-named 'Lark', was located in the Trondheim area and had been providing intelligence on Tirpitz since her arrival there.

Consideration was given to inserting the Chariots into the target area by air. One proposal involved the craft and their crews being parachuted from Handley Page Halifax bombers, but this was ruled out due to the difficulty of the crewmen being able to locate their Chariot after being dropped into the sea at night. Another proposal involved using Short Sunderland flying boats to land the craft and five aircraft were modified for this purpose. The Sunderland proposal was later abandoned as it was judged unlikely that these large aircraft would be able to reach Fættenfjord without being detected. The planners also considered using a British warship to transport the Chariots and their crews, but this was rejected in favour of using a Norwegian freighter or fishing boat.

It was decided to transport the Chariots and their crews by sea from the UK to the island of Frøya to the west of Trondheimsfjorden. The Chariots would then be attached below the waterline of a boat provided by members of the Norwegian resistance, which was to bluff its way through the German defences of Trondheimsfjorden and sail to the island of Tautra to the north of Fættenfjord. The crews would board the Chariots near Tautra and attack Tirpitz. Pound approved this plan on 26 June. The attack was designated Operation Title and scheduled to take place in October 1942. Horton and Wilson were given joint overall responsibility for the operation.

=== Selection of participants ===
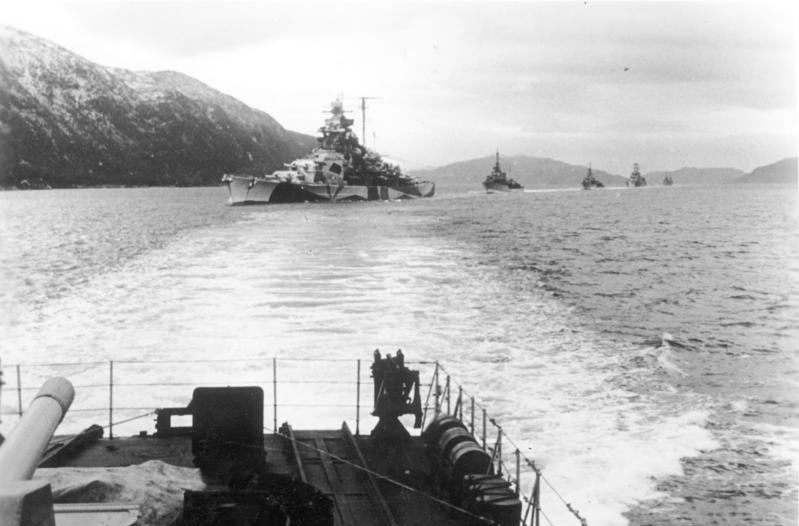
Tirpitz and other German warships at Bogen Bay, Norway in October 1942

Following Pound's approval of the plan, contact was made with the resistance in Trondheim through a Norwegian diplomat stationed in Sweden. The resistance agent Arne Christiansen travelled to Trondheim to seek assistance from a resistance network there. The network's members provided information about German security measures in the area and how they could be evaded. This included information on the documents that ships travelling in the waters around Trondheimsfjorden were required to carry by the German occupation authorities, with the resistance agents offering to provide copies. Christiansen also attempted to recruit a fishing boat captain at Frøya who was willing to transport the Chariots.

In the meantime, the Chariot force continued training at Loch Cairnbawn in Scotland. In late August seven Chariots made a mock attack against the British battleship HMS Howe. The battleship was moored near the shore of the loch and protected by two layers of nets and a patrol boat. Her crew were expecting an attack. Four of the seven Chariot teams penetrated the defences and planted warheads on the battleship. Another mock attack the next night involving four teams was successful. While one of the Chariot crew members died as a result of an accident during a third mock attack, the exercise demonstrated that the force was ready for combat.

Christiansen was unable to persuade any fishermen at Frøya to provide a boat. One man who was approached declined to cooperate due to the likelihood of Germans retaliating against his family if his role became known. Wilson decided to use ships and personnel from the Shetland Bus force instead. In August Mitchell met with Larsen and asked if he would be willing to take part. During this discussion Mitchell explained the plan and noted that the attack would be very dangerous. Larsen immediately agreed. He was subsequently heavily involved in finalising the plans for Operation Title.

The day after agreeing to take part, Larsen met with Wilson in London and was directed to use one of the Shetland Bus force's boats and recruit a crew of three. He chose three of his friends for the crew. They were the engineer Palmer Bjørnøy, deckhand Johannes Kalve and radio operator Roald Strand. Larsen was unable to disclose the nature of the operation, but warned the men that it would likely cost their lives. To carry the attack force Larsen selected a boat named Arthur which he had stolen during an October 1941 minelaying attack in Norway. The boat and its engine were both elderly, and few checks were made to confirm whether it could reach Trondheimsfjorden.

Two teams of Chariot operators were also selected. One comprised Sub-Lieutenant William Brewster and Able Seaman A. Brown. The other was made up of Sergeant Don Craig (a soldier in the British Army) and Able Seaman Bob Evans. The two other operators who travelled on board Arthur, Able Seamen Billy Tebb and Malcolm Causer, were to help the Chariot crews to don their bulky Sladen Suits and serve as spare crewmen if needed. (Note: The Sladen Suit was a specialised diving suit developed for the Chariot crewmen. It included a glazed window in the helmet instead of individual eyepieces to allow the use of night binoculars during operations. The suits were bulky and very difficult to put on, and operators needed an assistant to help them with this.) Brewster commanded the Chariot unit, with Brown as his deputy.

Arthur needed to be modified for the operation, including to carry two Chariots. The craft were to be transported on her deck for the first part of the operation and be towed underwater for the last 100 miles (160 km) to Fættenfjord. A derrick was added to the boat to lift the Chariots into the water. Larsen personally installed two large eye bolts to the hull of Arthur to which the noses of the Chariots were to be attached via steel hawsers while they were towed. A secret compartment was also added to hide the four Chariot crewmen and two support operators from any German personnel who inspected the boat in Norwegian waters. Arthur was disguised as a similar boat known to be operating in Norway.

=== Final planning ===
The final plan for the attack specified that Larsen was to scuttle Arthur after releasing the Chariots as it was considered impossible for the boat to pass back through the German patrols. The four Norwegians and two British support staff would then row to shore and hide in a hay truck. Members of the Norwegian resistance would collect Arthur's crew and the surviving Chariot operators and drive them to the Swedish border. Alternative plans were also prepared for the resistance to guide the Allied personnel to the Swedish border by foot if it was too dangerous to drive.

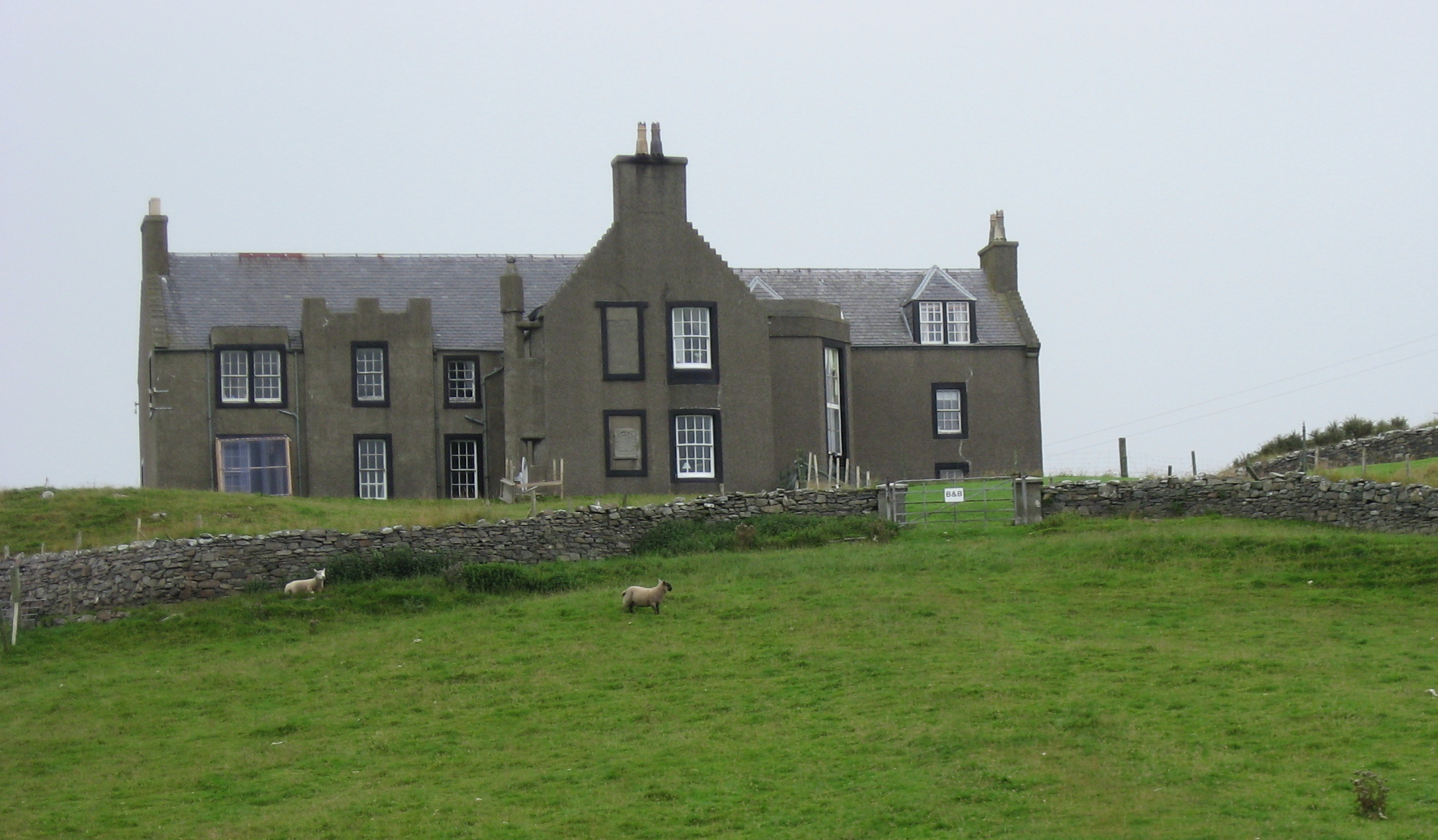
Lunna House in the Shetland Islands, where the Allied forces waited before launching Operation Title

During the first week of October Arthur and the two Chariot teams made a final practice attack against the battleship HMS Nelson. This was successful, with the Chariot teams cutting through the nets surrounding the battleship, attaching their charges and escaping undetected. The attack force then proceeded to Lunna House in the Shetland Islands where the men awaited orders to begin the operation.

A set of falsified papers for Arthur and its crew was prepared in October. These documents were extensive, and included identity cards for each of the Norwegian sailors. Forged registration papers for Arthur were also needed, along with a certified crew list, a fishing permit, a pass to enter the waters near Trondheim and a document stamped by each of the German harbourmasters in the ports the ship had purportedly visited over the previous three months. All of the forgeries needed to be prepared to a high standard, as it was expected that Arthur would be stopped and inspected by German security forces as it entered Trondheimsfjorden, with the papers coming under close scrutiny. These documents were based on papers collected by the resistance which the Norwegian agent Odd Sørli had smuggled from Norway to Sweden and then to London a month after Christiansen's visit to Trondheim. The forgeries were completed shortly before the ship departed to ensure that the faked signatures on the papers were for the German officers responsible for the region through which the attack force would pass. Arthur was portrayed in the papers as a cargo ship and a load of peat was embarked. During the voyage to Norway the Chariots' warheads were hidden in the peat.

Tirpitz returned to Fættenfjord on 23 October and was sighted there by a RAF photo reconnaissance aircraft the next day. On 25 October Horton ordered Operation Title to be initiated, with the attack scheduled for the 31st of the month.

== Attack ==
=== Voyage to Trondheimsfjorden ===
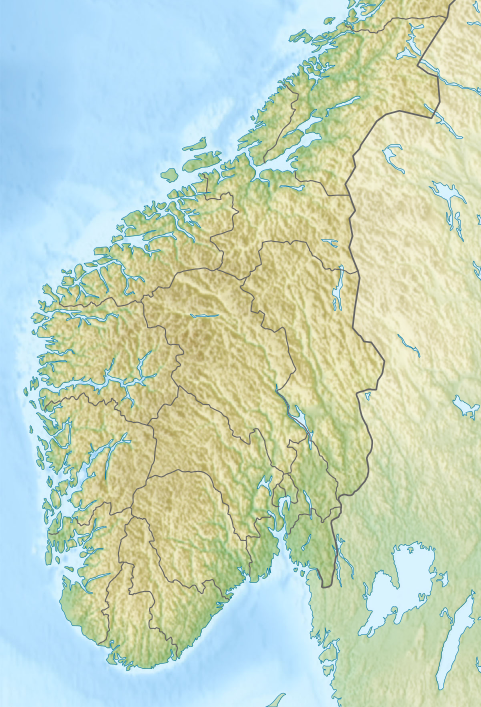
The locations of key events in southern Norway during Operation Title

Arthur sailed at 9 am the morning of 26 October. The weather was bad throughout the voyage to Norway, causing several of the seamen to suffer from seasickness. Mountains near the village of Bud in Norway were sighted at midday on 28 October. This marked the start of the most dangerous part of the trip to Norway, as Arthur did not have papers giving it authority to sail outside Norwegian coastal waters and German aircraft regularly patrolled the area. If detected, the ship would be treated as a hostile craft. Bjørnøy coaxed as much power as possible from Arthur's engine so it could quickly pass through the danger zone. The ship's engine broke down that afternoon, forcing the crew to erect a sail while it was repaired. The engine was restarted in the late afternoon and Arthur proceeded to the island of Edøya. The cover story for the boat's voyage was that she was carrying a load of peat from the island.

Edøya was reached during the morning of 29 October and Arthur's crew anchored there. (Note: Robert Lyman wrote that Arthur's crew spotted the mountains in the evening of 27 October, and arrived at Edøya on the morning of 28 October.) The plan for the operation called for the Chariots to be fitted with their warheads, unloaded from Arthur and secured to the boat while at Edøya. Attempts to do this during the morning were frustrated by several German aircraft which flew low to inspect the ship. All work had to be stopped each time and the British personnel hid below deck. While the warheads were fitted to the Chariots after the German aircraft stopped patrolling, rough seas caused Arthur to drag her anchor. This made unloading the Chariots impossible and the crew decided to find a better anchorage. This took the rest of the day.

Work to unload the Chariots resumed at 5 am on 30 October. (Note: Lyman states that this occurred on 29 October.) Both Chariots were unloaded and secured to the bottom of Arthur's hull. Ropes attached to cleats on the boat's deck were used to keep them horizontal. Shortly afterwards an elderly Norwegian civilian approached the ship in a rowing boat. He asked questions about the purpose of the hawsers and Chariots below Arthur. In response, Larsen claimed that the hawsers were for fishing nets and the Chariots were used for minesweeping on behalf of the Germans. The old man asked for butter and was given some. Larsen then angrily threatened to kill the man and his daughter if he told anyone about what he had seen. This caused him to rapidly row away. The work needed to secure the Chariots and delays caused by the old man meant that it was not possible for Arthur to reach the position from which it was to attack Tirpitz that night. Arthur resumed its voyage shortly after midday. Its crew threw the radio and other items that were identifiably British overboard at this time.

Before reaching Trondheimsfjorden Larsen intended to visit the small town of Hestvik to meet with the storekeeper Nils Strøm, who was to provide information on German activities in the region. During the voyage to the town Arthur's engine began to make loud knocking noises. Bjørnøy inspected the engine and found that a piston was damaged and needed to be urgently repaired. When Arthur reached Hestvik at 11 pm that night Larsen directed Bjørnøy to repair the engine while he met with Strøm. The Norwegian shopkeeper provided information on German security procedures. Bjørnøy was unable to repair the engine as the piston had cracked, meaning that it needed to be replaced or repaired with more sophisticated tools than were available on the boat. Strøm arranged for a trustworthy local blacksmith to be woken up, and he agreed to let Bjørnøy use his forge to repair the piston. After spending two hours working on the piston, Bjørnøy reassembled the engine and judged that it would last for long enough to get the boat to Fættenfjord.

=== Trondheimsfjorden ===
Arthur departed Hestvik at 9 am on 31 October. The boat sailed at half its usual speed to reduce the strain on the engine. As the waters between the town and Trondheimsfjorden were regularly patrolled by German security boats and it was expected that Arthur would be stopped for questioning, the British personnel hid below decks with a machine gun at the ready. The Norwegians were armed with pistols. A German patrol boat was sighted at 10 am but did not stop Arthur. Other German boats were later encountered and also let Arthur pass.

The locations of key events in the Trondheimsfjorden area during Operation Title

The Norwegian boat was stopped for questioning by the German crew of a naval trawler as it entered Trondheimsfjorden, near the fortress at Agdenes. This armed trawler was responsible for inspecting all shipping entering the fjord. A young German sailor appeared to spot the Chariots, but was distracted when Kalve threw a rope at him. A German officer boarded Arthur, carefully went over the crew's papers, and questioned Larsen. He also briefly inspected the cargo of peat but did not find the hidden British personnel or the Chariots. The German officer departed after about 15 minutes. Arthur was then given permission to proceed into Trondheimsfjorden. Weather conditions began to worsen, causing one of the Chariots to start to come loose as the ship neared Trondheim at about 5 pm. The Allied personnel were unable to do anything in response as they would have been observed.

After Arthur passed Trondheim the British personnel came up on deck briefly and then began the slow process of dressing the attack crews in their diving suits. At this time the ship was about 20 miles (32 km) from Tautra from where the Chariots were to be launched. Craig and Evans were the first to be dressed, followed by Brewster and Brown.

As the British personnel were dressed, Arthur passed through increasingly rough seas as a storm developed. This caused the Chariots to sway and collide with the hull of the boat. Larsen slowed Arthur to reduce the Chariots' motion, but was unable to stop the boat as it would have been inspected again by the Germans. He was hopeful that the storm would quickly end, as was common. At 10 pm, as Brewster and Brown completed dressing, they heard what Brewster described as a "loud, grinding tearing noise". The boat then shook and it appeared that something had fouled its propeller. It was thought that one of the Chariots had broken free and Larsen steered Arthur close to the shore to find a patch of calm water. Evans then went into the water and discovered that both Chariots were gone. At the time Arthur was only 10 miles (16 km) from Tirpitz.

=== Escape ===
The loss of the Chariots forced the abandonment of Operation Title. The original escape plan was now unviable, as it was twelve hours before the attack force was scheduled to meet up with the local resistance. It was not possible to scuttle Arthur near the shore as this would probably be seen by the Germans, and Bjørnøy advised that the engine was about to fail again. Larsen proposed that the force proceed to the east along Trondheimsfjorden, find a secluded place to scuttle the boat and then attempt to reach the Swedish border. The British agreed. The Allied personnel began preparing the ship for scuttling and assembled food supplies and weapons for their escape attempt. They did not have cold-weather clothing suitable for the terrain as this was to have been provided by the Norwegian resistance after the attack.

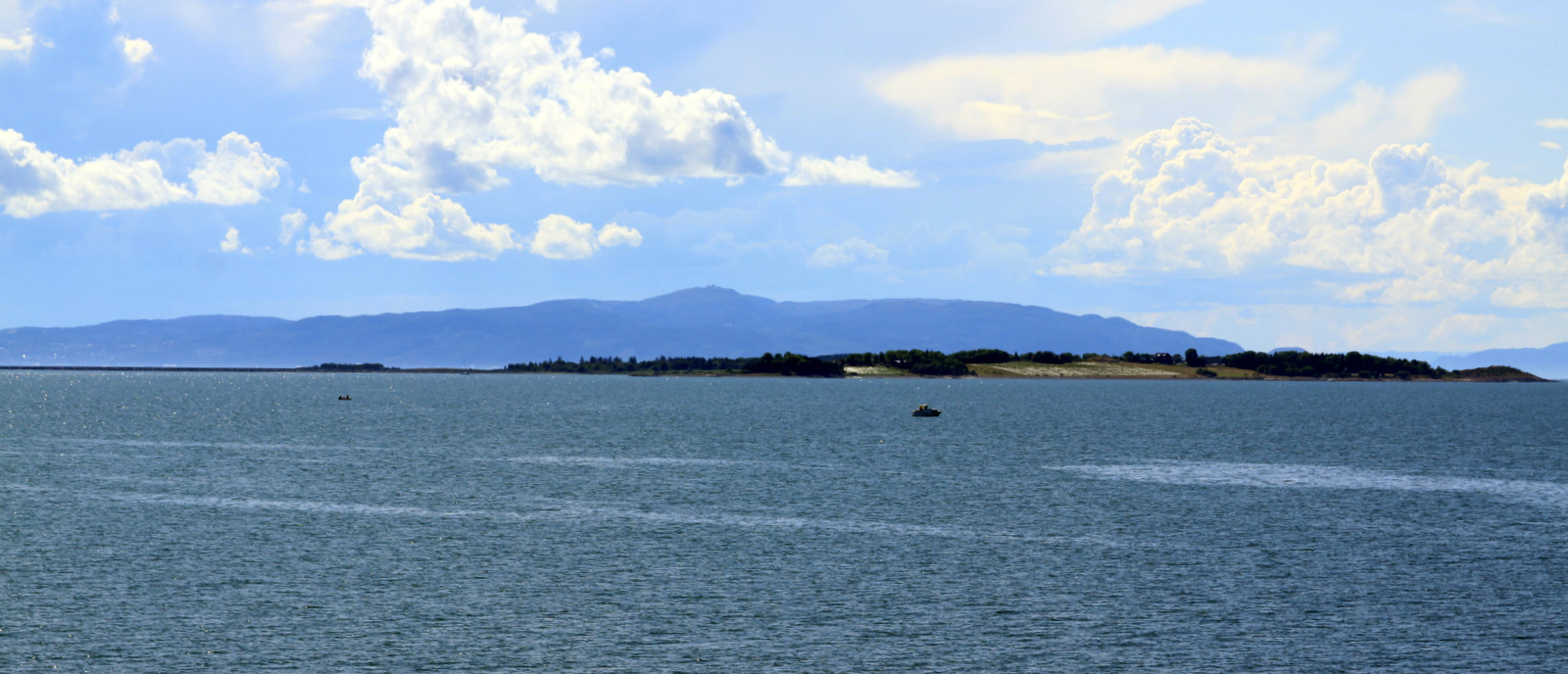
The channel between Tautra and the Frosta peninsula in which Arthur was scuttled

Arthur was scuttled in the channel between Tautra and the Frosta peninsula at about 1 am on 1 November. The exhausted Allied personnel rowed ashore, equipped only with maps, pistols and a small quantity of food. The Norwegians expected to be shot if they were captured, but the British believed they would be treated as prisoners of war as they were wearing military uniforms. (Note: Lyman puts the date that Arthur was scuttled as the morning of 31 October.) They were unaware of the Commando Order that had been issued by Hitler on 18 October 1942. This directed that all Allied special forces personnel who were taken prisoner were to be executed after being interrogated.

After coming ashore the party proceeded on foot to the east in a single group. Larsen ordered them to halt and rest after the sun rose. At midday they set off again, now split into two five-man groups. Larsen led one group, accompanied by Craig, Evans, Tebb and Strand. Brewster was the leader of the other group, which also comprised Brown, Causer, Kalve and Bjørnøy. Each party was to take a different route to the Swedish border, which was about 50 miles (80 km) to the east. Brewster's group was to follow the shore of Trondheimsfjorden and Larsen's was to take an inland route. It was hoped that splitting into two parties would be safer than travelling in a single group. The men would need to first make their way through the heavily defended area around Trondheimsfjorden. They would then pass through a farming district and finally climb over a 6,000-foot (1,800 m) high plateau.

The group led by Larsen escaped detection during a difficult trip to near the Swedish border. As they approached the border they encountered a German military policeman accompanied by a member of the collaborationist Norwegian Hirden force. The Allied personnel were arrested, but Tebb was able to pull out his concealed pistol shortly afterwards and opened fire. The German was killed and his Norwegian comrade escaped. Evans was wounded in the incident, though sources differ on how badly. The Allied personnel could not remain in the area due to the presence of German troops nearby and it was decided to leave Evans behind. It was believed that Evans would be treated as a prisoner of war as he was still wearing a naval uniform. The remainder of Larsen's group made it across the border shortly afterwards. They surrendered to a Swedish Army outpost near the village of Skalstugan on the morning of 5 November. Larsen told the Swedes that he was a resistance fighter escorting Royal Navy sailors who had been shipwrecked during an operation off Norway.

Brewster's group made good progress on 1 November and sighted the German cruiser Admiral Scheer at her well-disguised anchorage in Lofjord. They did not encounter any Germans other than a small group of sailors who were out for a walk, and slept in an abandoned hut that night. The next night they were given shelter and a meal by a Norwegian farmer. The men slept in a hunting cabin the night after that. Brewster's group crossed the Swedish border not long after Larsen's had at a point about 2 miles (3.2 km) to the south. They turned themselves in at a police station. Causer was suffering from frostbite and needed to be taken to hospital. The other members of the group were in generally good health. Larsen was very pleased with the results of the escape attempt and believed that Evans would be treated correctly as a prisoner of war.

The nine Allied personnel who crossed into Sweden were held at a house for two days. (Note: Lyman states that they were held near the border for 10 days.) During this period the Germans contacted the Swedish authorities at Skalstugan to request the return of a group of men who had escaped after committing a murder. Larsen denied any involvement and the Swedes rejected the German request. The Allied personnel were then taken to an internment camp near Stockholm. After a period there they were handed over to the British embassy in Stockholm. Six of the Allied personnel were flown back to the UK on 27 November, with the others following after they had recovered from injuries sustained during their escape from Norway.

After being scuttled Arthur settled on the floor of the fjord with its masts sticking out of the water. It was located by the Germans and raised. The Germans investigated the boat and, after discovering its secret compartments, correctly judged what its purpose had been.

== Aftermath ==
=== Murder of Evans ===
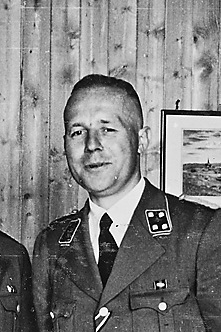
Gerhard Flesch, the head of the Gestapo in Trondheim

Evans was taken prisoner soon after being left by Larsen's party and received medical treatment. He was then handed over to the head of the Gestapo (the German secret police) in Trondheim, Gerhard Flesch. Flesch transferred Evans to senior Kriegsmarine officers for questioning about the details of Operation Title. When this was completed the officers returned Evans to Flesch despite knowing that the Gestapo was likely to kill him. The British historian Sir Ludovic Kennedy has written that Evans told the Gestapo "everything he knew about the Chariots and their functions" while under interrogation and this helped them to investigate the wreckage of Arthur.

Evans was subsequently imprisoned at the Grini detention camp near Oslo. On 19 January 1943 he was shot in the Trandumskogen forest alongside several British soldiers captured during the Operation Freshman raid on the Vemork Norsk Hydro hydrogen electrolysis plant. Evans' body was thrown in a mass grave and later reburied at the Oslo Western Civil Cemetery.

The murder of Evans was personally authorised by Field Marshal Wilhelm Keitel, the chief of the Oberkommando der Wehrmacht (the German military's high command). It was one of the incidents for which Keitel and Flesch were separately prosecuted after the war. Both were found guilty of war crimes and executed. The supreme commander of German forces in Norway at the time of Evans' murder, Colonel-General Nikolaus von Falkenhorst, was also prosecuted for this killing and the deaths of other Allied prisoners. He was found guilty and sentenced to 20 years' imprisonment, but was released in 1953.

=== Assessments ===
After their return to the UK the Vice-Chief of the Naval Staff Admiral Sir Henry Ruthven Moore sent the participants in Operation Title a message congratulating them for their bravery. In this message he attributed the failure of the attack to bad luck and thanked SOE for its involvement. Larsen was awarded the Conspicuous Gallantry Medal, becoming the first non-Briton to receive it, and Brewster the Distinguished Service Cross. Evans was mentioned in despatches.

Historians regard Operation Title as a skilful but flawed attack. Writing in 1956, the British official historian Stephen Roskill observed that the operation had been "most original and gallant, though unsuccessful". C. E. T. Warren and James Benson had reached a similar conclusion in 1953, noting that if the Chariots "had only hung on for less than another hour [after the storm had passed] Tirpitz would have probably been destroyed". During a 1973 television interview Brewster attributed Operation Title's failure to the 24-hour delay caused by Arthur's engine problems, and observed that the weather might have been better on the night of 30/31 October.

More recent works by historians have reached similar conclusions. Niklas Zetterling and Michael Tamelander wrote in 2009 that the Chariot teams were likely to have severely damaged or sunk Tirpitz if they had been able to attack, and Operation Title failed due to "a brief change of weather and a weakness in the mountings of the [human] torpedoes". Similarly, in 2012 Patrick Bishop judged that Tirpitz was "spared by a lucky change in weather and faulty workmanship". He has written that despite the "great ingenuity and technical skill" that were put into the plan and the risks taken by many Norwegians, it failed due to the faulty method used to fasten the Chariots to Arthur and as a result "a great opportunity was squandered". Robert Lyman concluded in 2015 that "Operation Title had been a brave effort" and "failed through no fault of the men who came so close to success". In 2019 Angus Konstam wrote that if Arthur had not encountered the storm on 31 October "the course of the naval war might have been altered" and the attack had been "very well-conceived and monumentally courageous".

=== Subsequent attacks ===
Operation Title proved to be the final attempt to attack Tirpitz at Trondheimsfjorden. The battleship underwent maintenance there over the winter, and in March 1943 was transferred to northern Norway to be closer to the route taken by the Arctic convoys. Tirpitz was briefly stationed at Bogen Bay and arrived at its new permanent base at Kaafjord on 23 March.

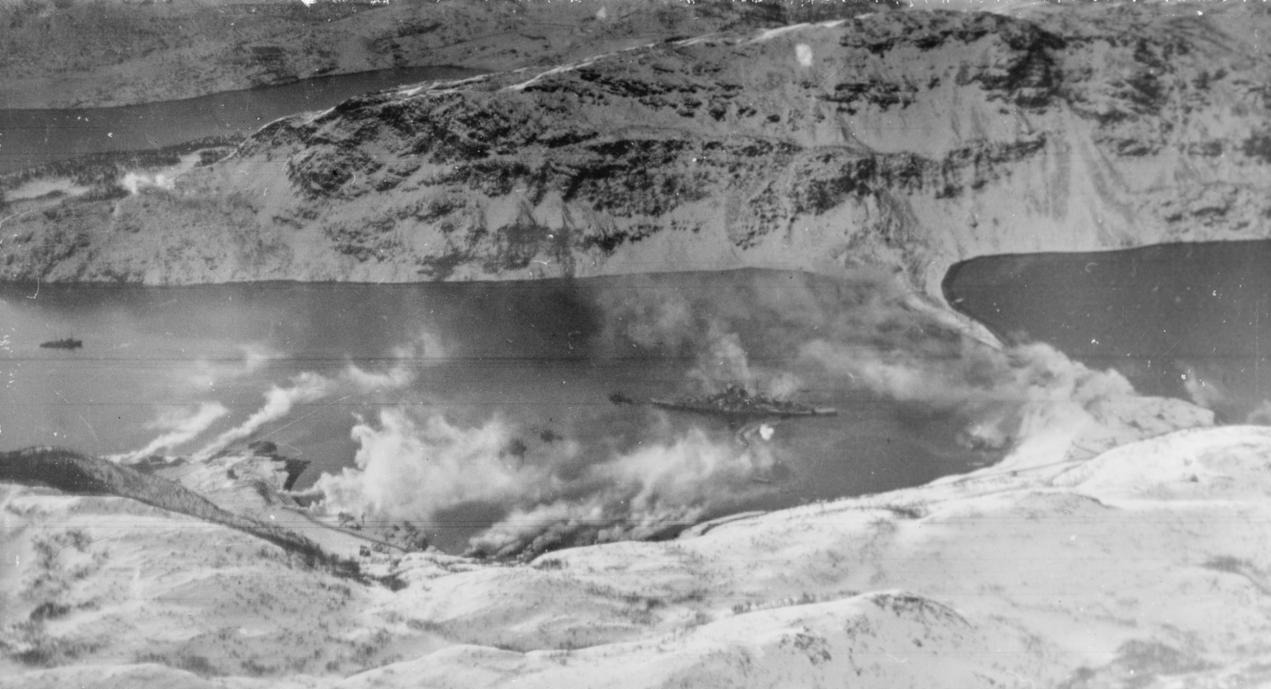
Tirpitz partially covered by a smokescreen at Kaafjord. The battleship was repeatedly attacked at this anchorage.

Kaafjord was considered too distant from the UK for another attack using Chariots to be viable. As a result, it was decided to employ X-class submarines instead. This attack, which was designated Operation Source, was conducted by the Royal Navy in September 1943. Six X-class submarines were dispatched against Tirpitz and two other major German warships at Kaafjord. They entered Kaafjord on 22 September and two of the midget submarine crews placed explosive charges below Tirpitz. These devices caused severe damage to the battleship. It was not possible to completely repair Tirpitz and she was never fully operational again.

The Royal Navy's Fleet Air Arm made a series of attacks on Tirpitz during 1944. The first, Operation Tungsten, took place on 3 April 1944 as the repairs following Operation Source neared completion. Considerable damage was inflicted. The Fleet Air Arm's other attacks were not effective, with no damage to the battleship resulting from Operation Mascot on 17 July and the Operation Goodwood series of attacks in August causing only superficial damage. Following the failure of Operation Goodwood the task of attacking the battleship was transferred to RAF Bomber Command. The first heavy bomber raid against Kaafjord (Operation Paravane) was conducted on 15 September 1944, with the bombers flying from staging bases in northern Russia. This attack inflicted irreparable damage on Tirpitz and she was later transferred south to the Tromsø area of Norway to be used as an immobile coastal defence battery. The battleship was sunk there with heavy German casualties by another Bomber Command raid on 12 November.

The Royal Navy made a number of other Chariot attacks during World War II. None involved carrying the craft covertly on board small boats, as the use of Arthur in this role was considered unsatisfactory. Submarines were found to be the most effective way of transporting Chariots and were used to mount several raids in the Mediterranean from a base at Malta between December 1942 and September 1943. These attacks had mixed results. A joint British-Italian Chariot unit also made three successful attacks against former Italian warships in German-occupied ports between June 1944 and April 1945. In October 1943 two Chariots were infiltrated into Norwegian waters near Askvoll on board a motor torpedo boat to attack German shipping; this operation was unsuccessful. A pair of the craft were also transported by submarine during a successful operation in which they sank two Japanese-controlled Italian ships at Phuket in Thailand on the night of 27/28 October 1944. No other attacks were attempted in Asia as the Royal Navy learned that the Japanese military would severely mistreat any captured Chariot crewmen. The historian Paul Kemp has judged that the results obtained by the Chariot force probably did not justify the resources that went into developing it and the casualties incurred in its operations. He has also argued that the use of the craft after the failure of Operation Title was a mistake, among other reasons because there was not a strong rationale for the subsequent Chariot operations.

The 1955 British film Above Us the Waves includes portrayals of Operation Title and Operation Source. It was based on the popular non-fiction book of the same title by C. E. T. Warren and James Benson. Above Us the Waves was one of a large number of British films about World War II released in the 1950s that provided a triumphalist perspective on the conflict. It was commercially successful.
