= Shetland bus boats =

The Shetland bus was the name given to a clandestine special operations group that made a permanent link between Shetland, Scotland, and German-occupied Norway. From mid-1941 until the end of the war it operated a number of vessels, mostly Norwegian fishing boats.

== Background ==
Germany launched their invasion of Norway on 9 April 1940, and despite the efforts of the Norwegians and the British, the Germans controlled most of the country by the beginning of May. The occupation of Norway and the oppression which followed immediately prompted a number of Norwegians to escape and make landfall in the Orkney and Shetland Islands.

Only a few weeks after the occupation began, the first boats of an "armada" of fishing vessels and other boats began to arrive in Shetland. Many of these boats made several journeys across the North Sea carrying refugees. The boats were of many types and shapes, but most of those later used as the "Shetland Bus", were from 50 to 70 feet (21 m), with two masts and equipped with a 30 to 70 hp (52 kW) single-cylinder semi-diesel engine, which made the characteristic 'tonk-tonk' sound. They had a maximum speed of 9 knots (17 km/h).

These engines were very unusual, and spare parts were not available in Britain, but that was easily solved. Norway's largest engine factory, Wichmann Diesel, at the time under German control, was located at Bømlo, near Bergen. The agents in the area received messages about which parts were needed, workers in the factory, many of them active members of the Resistance Movement, smuggled them out, and the parts were sent to Shetland with the next "Bus".

There were "Hardanger Cutters", with a straight bow and long stern from the Bergen area, and the more rounded "Møre Cutters" from the area around Ålesund. It appeared that the "Møre Cutter" was the strongest and best fitted for the heavy weather in the North Sea. Most of their crossings were done in the dark winter months with storms and heavy seas.

Although these crossings were, by their nature, carried out in a manner to avoid enemy contact. The crews managed to equip the boats with several concealed weapons. David Howarth, who was with Special Operations Executive and Norwegian seaman, Per Blystad (1911-1942) invented many of these constructions. The most ingenious of these was a concrete-lined oil drum bolted to the deck. When the removable lid was lifted, a pair of ready loaded Lewis Guns were telescoped into firing position, with the aid of a counterweight below decks. A steel shield came automatically up to protect the gunner. Oil drums were a natural thing to carry on a fishing boat's deck. Once in the North Sea, one of the boats was inspected by a suspicious British Navy ship, all other weapons were confiscated, but they did not find the two twin machine guns mounted on deck! Special low mountings for twin 0.50" Colt machine guns were mounted in the netroom, at the aft of the boat. These were not totally hidden, but with the use of folding handles, triggers, aims and shields they managed to keep them just above the edge of the gunwale, and they were easy to camouflage with a net. A similar construction was mounted in the bow, with a tarpaulin over, of the same shape as the covering of the whaling harpoons many of the Norwegian fishing boats had in the bow. At last all of the Bus boats carried seven or eight mounted, ready armed machine guns, and were able to protect themselves against enemy aircraft attacks.

In October 1943 three American submarine chasers, Hitra, Vigra and Hessa, were delivered, which made the journeys across the North Sea much safer. The submarine chasers made more than 100 crossings with no losses of ships or men. The only damage that occurred on the boats was when the Hessa was attacked by an Allied aircraft.

== Boats used in the Shetland Bus operation ==
=== M/B Aksel (M40G) ===
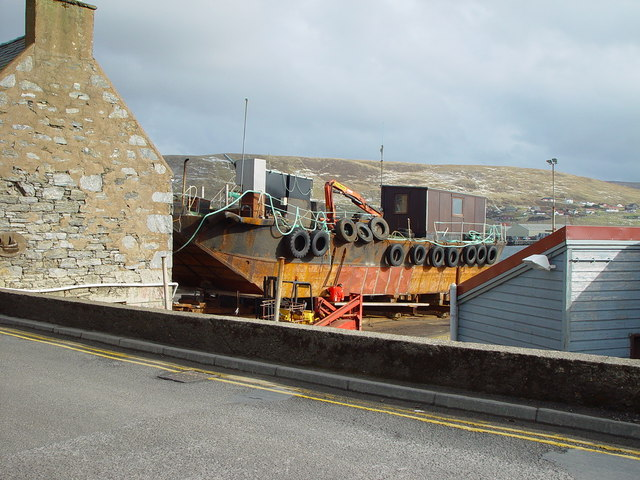
Malakoff & Moore's Slip, Scalloway, Shetland. This slip was one of the links in 'The Shetland Bus'. Now it is used for servicing fishing boats and salmon farm vessels

Aksel of Giske, 65 feet (20 m) long, the first "Shetland Bus" boat, arrived Shetland on 5 May 1941 with 20 refugees. Skipper Anders Nærøy chose the Aksel on the first official "Shetland Bus" mission, on 30 August 1941. Aksel later made several journeys to Norway with different skippers.

On 8 December 1942, Aksel, on its way from Kristiansund, skippered by Bård Grotle, sent out a SOS signal 200 nautical miles (370 km) north of Shetland. A Catalina flying boat and an MTB were sent out to search for the vessel. The next day the Catalina found the lifeboat with the crew, and the Aksel nearly sunk nearby. The sea was too rough for the aircraft to land, and the MTB had to return to Lerwick before they reached the lifeboat because of lack of fuel. The crew were never found again. Several aircraft and boats searched for days, but the crew of six were lost.

=== M/K Heland (M5V) ===
Owned by Sevrin Roald, Arne Roald and Olav Røsvik, of Vigra. Built by Einar Helland, Vestnes 1937. 60 feet (18 m) long, with 85 hp (63 kW) Haahjem engine.

On its first voyage in November 1941 the Heland was skippered by one of the owners, Sevrin Roald, and made for Shetland, with two Company Linge agents Karl Johan Aarsæter and Åsmund Wisløff aboard. Using the false name M/K Per, it managed to get undamaged through the same storm in which the Blia disappeared, and returned to Norway with supplies to other agents.

Another agent transport was made in January 1942. On 27 February 1942, the Heland arrived at Lunna with 23 refugees, among them, Milorg's district leader in the Ålesund area, Trygve Rypdal and family. Sevrin Roald brought his wife, Inga, with him and they both became part of the land crew in the "Shetland Bus" operation in Scalloway.

As a "Shetland Bus", the Heland made several tours to Norway, mostly skippered by August Nerø, but with other skippers too. There were many narrow escapes, but the vessel always returned safely to Shetland. In 1943, when the submarine chasers arrived, the Heland became a reserve vessel and made transport voyages to Scotland.

When the war ended, the Heland returned to Norway and became fishing vessel again. In 1971, it was donated to Sunnmøre Museum. The Heland is now preserved as a typical representative fishing vessel of the "Shetland Bus" fleet.

=== M/B Vita (H95B) ===
Built by Lindestøl Shipyard Risør in 1939 for Lorenz Knudsen a.o., Brandanes. The Vita had a 40 hp (30 kW) Wickmann engine.

The Vita arrived at Shetland on 9 May 1940 with four Norwegian Navy officers and two other refugees aboard. The Vita started as a "Bus" boat before the "Shetland Bus" was officially established. Her first voyage to Norway was on 22 December 1940, skippered by Hilmar Langøy. The next was on 27 March 1941, this time skippered by Ingvald Johansen, who became her skipper for the rest of her missions. Johansen's crew were Åge Sandvik, H.W. Olsen, Jens Haldorsen and J. Hermansen.

In May 1941, they picked up the twelve refugees from M/B Signal (M331A), which had suffered an engine failure and was drifting 60 nautical miles (110 km) off the Norwegian coast. In mid-September 1941, the Vita made a 900-nautical-mile (1,670 km) journey to Nord-Trøndelag.

Johansen did not always follow the security rules. Once he posted a letter in Norway to his fiancée. He told her when and where he would return, and asked her to meet him and come with him to Shetland. The girl got the letter, met him, and followed. In Shetland they got married, and Johansen was not punished.

Vita made seven successful voyages to Norway before her last. On 22 September 1941, she journeyed again to North Trøndelag, this time to Rekøy, to pick up some refugees. A traitor had told the Germans about the transport, and the Vita was seized and the crew arrested. The crew spent the rest of the war in prison, while the Germans used the Vita as a watch boat. After the war she became fishing boat in the North Sea again, until she was donated to the "Trondhjems Sjøfartsmuseum" (a maritime museum in Trondheim) in 1990. In 1995 she was taken over by "Kystmuseet i Sør-Trøndelag" (Sør-Trøndelag Coastal Museum) at Hitra. She is currently being renovated by local craftsman Per Johnson.

=== M/B Olaf (M73V) ===
Owned by Ansgar Sønderland and Johan O. Rørvik, Vigra. 52 feet long and with a 60 hp (45 kW) June-Munktell engine.

The owners gave their approval to use the Olaf in a refugee transport. It arrived at Lerwick on 30 September 1941 with seventeen refugees. The vessel was handed over to the "Shetland Bus" operation and Per Blystad from Fana became skipper. In the winter of 1942, the 'Olaf' made five voyages to Norway with agents and supplies, and returning with refugees. The crew on these tours were; Olai Hillersøy, Arne Nipen, Leif Kinn and Olav Kinn. On 17 April 1942, the Olaf went to Telavåg with the Company Linge agents Arne Værum and Emil Hvaal. The agents were discovered by the Germans, and that led to the "Telavåg Tragedy", were the whole population were jailed or put into concentration camps, and all the houses burned in revenge for two German Gestapo officers' deaths.

The Olaf was attacked and damaged by German aircraft several times, but it always managed to get back to Shetland. The worst damage occurred on 12 May 1942. Three crew from the wrecked Frøya, along with some others, went out with the Olaf to search for a raft with four of the Frøya crew. They were attacked five times by a German Dornier bomber. The vessel was severely damaged, and some of the crew wounded. One of the three men from the Frøya, Hans Johansen, later died of his wounds. The Olaf made no more journeys and after the war it was returned to the owners who sold it in 1948.

== Boats Lost ==
M/S Vita (H95B), September 1941
Skippered by Ingvald Johannesen. Seized by Germans in Rekøy, Norway. Crew arrested.
Nordsjøen, 20 October 1941
Nordsjøen, a minelayer, skippered by Gjertsen, was sunk in heavy weather off the coast of West Norway. All the crew survived and returned to Shetland on 31 October aboard the M/K Arthur.
M/K Blia (H197S), 14 November 1941
Skippered by Ingvald Lerøy she disappeared in a storm on the way from Norway to Shetland. The crew of seven and 35 Norwegian refugees were lost. In the same storm, one man was blown overboard and lost from M/K Arthur, skippered by Leif Larsen.
Sjø, August/September 1942
Sjø, a 28-foot (8.5 m) open boat, with Per Blystad and Mindor Berge was in Norway on a reconnaissance mission. They were taken prisoners by the Germans and later shot.
M/K Arthur (M192B), October 1942
Skippered by Leif Larsen she was scuttled in the Trondheimsfjord after a failed attempt to attack the German battleship Tirpitz during Operation Title. Larsen and his crew escaped overland to Sweden, but a British Royal Navy sailor following them was taken prisoner by Germans and shot.
M/K Aksel (M40G), 8 December 1942
Skippered by Bård Grotle. Sunk in the North Sea on the way back to Shetland. All six men lost their lives.
M/B Sandøy, 10 December 1942
Skippered by Harald Dyb, was attacked by German aircraft and sunk. Seven men were lost.
M/B Feiøy (H10AM), January 1943
Skippered by Ole Grotle. Disappeared on the way to Norway. Eight men were lost.
M/K Bergholm, 23 March 1943
Skippered by Leif Larsen. Was attacked by German aircraft and sunk. One man was killed in the attack. Larsen and six men, some wounded, managed to reach the coast of Norway by boat, and returned to Shetland later.
M/K Brattholm (M172HØ), 30 March 1943
Skippered by Sverre Kverhellen. Attacked by a German torpedo boat. Of the crew of eight and four agents, only one, Jan Baalsrud, survived. The rest were either killed in the attack or taken prisoner by the Germans, tortured, and shot in prison.

Those boats are the ten "Shetland Bus" boats that were lost from the base in Scalloway. For different reasons, there were some boats that started out from a base in Peterhead, and some of them were also lost.

M/B Frøya (M32G)
A rather new 70-foot (21 m) "Møre cutter" which had arrived at Shetland on 16 March 1942, with the agent Knut Årsæter and four other men from the Ålesund area. Towards the end of April, the vessel was sent out on a special mission to Troms, North Norway with a crew of seven and two agents. Off the coast of Trøndelag, the Frøya was bombed by a German aircraft, and began to sink. They had a small lifeboat, only 12-foot (4 m) long, and the skipper decided that only five men could board the boat. They made a raft of empty oil barrels for the others, and the skipper joined the men on the raft.

The five men in the lifeboat soon lost all their provisions, as they were washed out in the heavy sea, and they had to keep up a continuous bailing. They had a sail and tried to steer for Shetland. After several days, with no food and only the rainwater they could collect to drink, they sighted Muckle Flugga. Soon after they were picked up by a ship and told about the four men on the raft. Ships and planes were sent out searching.

Two of the men from the lifeboat were in a very bad condition, and were sent to hospital, while the other three were sent to the refugee camp in Lerwick. After a 24-hour sleep, these three men went out with the Olaf to help search for the raft. They were again attacked by German aircraft, and hardly made it back to Baltasound. One of the three men later died of the wounds sustained in the attack.

Everyone believed that the four men on the raft were lost, but when the war ended, it was discovered that they had all survived. After drifting for twelve days in heavy weather in the North Sea, they were spotted by a German aircraft and rescued. They said that they were ordinary Norwegian shipwrecked fishermen, and were put in a German POW camp, where they stayed until the end of the war.

M/B Streif (H261B)
The Streif was sent out on a mission to Trøndelag, with an agent and supplies. The crew were that of the Harald, which had an engine failure. They went out with no navigator, because he had fallen ill, and there was no other available. The voyage to Norway went well, but on their return, the engine stopped, and they started drifting. After some days they managed to start the engine again, but they had no idea where they were. One day they saw a British plane, and flashed a signal. The plane turned eastward, and they believed that they were west of Shetland, and steered south, as they were bound for Peterhead.

After some time, they grounded on a sandbank. They realized that they had reached the coast of the Netherlands, and managed to get rid of their weapons and other suspicious items before the Germans arrived. They told a story about escaping from the British who wanted their vessel. The story was believed, and all were sent to an ordinary POW camp. If not, they surely would have been executed. By coincidence they met the crew from the Frøya raft in the camp, and joined them until the war ended.

The Streif stayed in The Netherlands, and the owner's son has said that long after the war, he received letters with questions about the engine.

Bodø
The fishing vessel Bodø was sent out from Peterhead to South Norway on 1 January 1943, with commandos for "Operation Carhampton". On her return, the Bodø hit a mine near the Scottish coast, and the whole crew were lost. One of her crew, Olaf Skarpenes, has his name on the monument in Scalloway.

== Other sources ==
- Howarth, David (1950) The Shetland Bus: A WWII Epic of Escape, Survival, and Adventure (Lyons Press) ISBN 978-1-59921-321-7
- Howarth, David (1998) The Shetland Bus (Shetland Times Ltd) ISBN 978-1-898852-42-1
- Iversen, Kaare (2000) Shetland Bus Man (Pentland Press Ltd) ISBN 978-1-85821-816-8
- Sorvaag, Trygve (2005) Shetland Bus: Faces and Places 60 Years on (Shetland Times Ltd) ISBN 978-1-898852-88-9
