= Leif Larsen =

Norwegian sailor

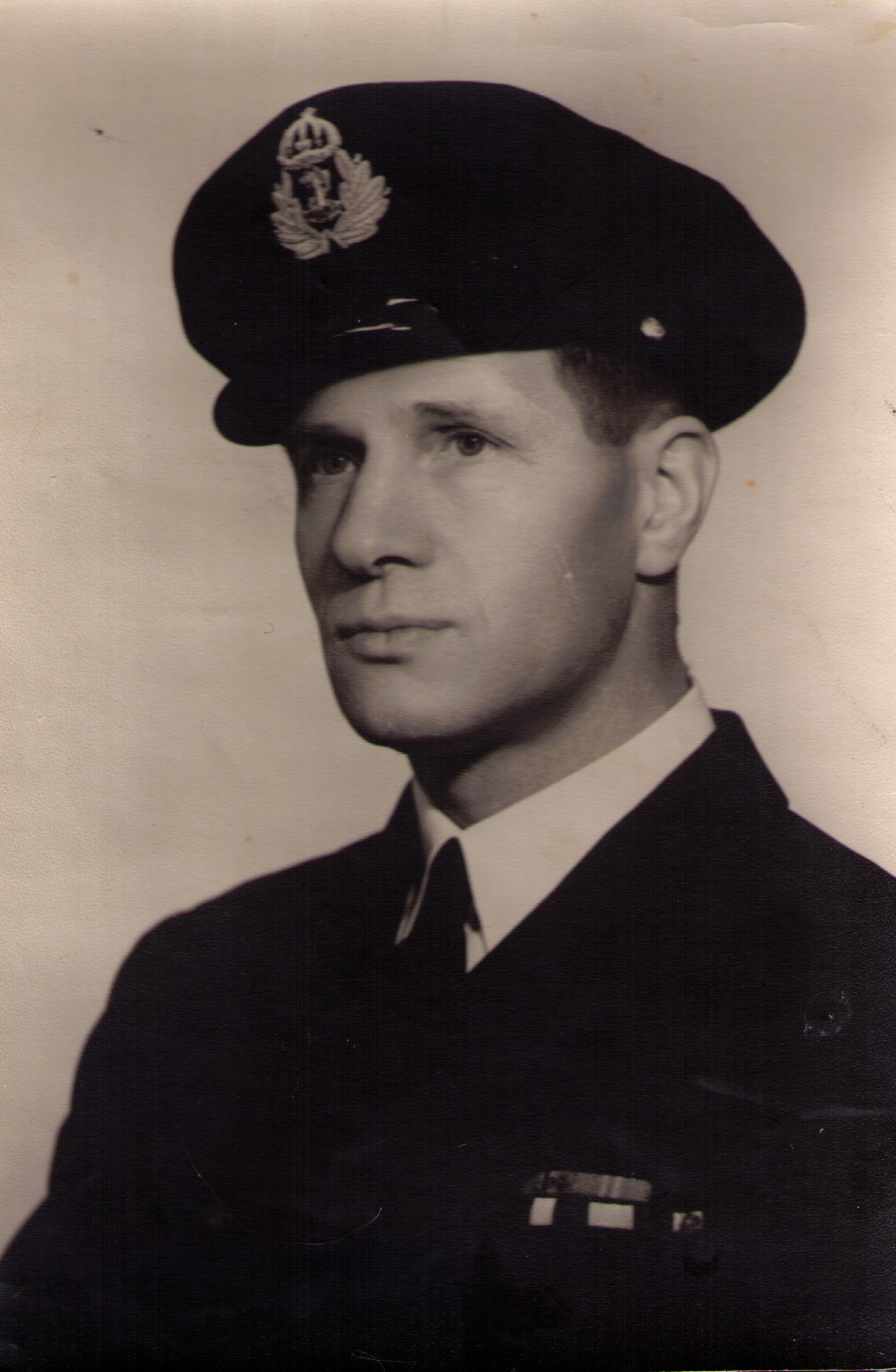
- Born: 9 January 1906; Bergen, Norway
- Died: 12 October 1990 (aged 84); Bergen, Norway
- Spouse: Anna Justad
- Military career
- Allegiance: Norway
- Rank: Kapteinløytnant (Lieutenant Commander (N))
- Nickname: "Shetlands Larsen"
- Units: Shetland bus
- Commands: MV Arthur; MV Bergholm; SC Vigra; Other small vessels
- Conflicts: World War II
- Awards: War Cross with two Swords; St. Olav's Medal With Oak Branch; Norwegian War Medal with three stars; Participation (in World War II) Medal; King Haakon VII's 70th anniversary Medal; Conspicuous Gallantry Medal; Distinguished Service Medal and Bar; Distinguished Service Cross; Distinguished Service Order; Participation in the Winter War Medal; Medal of Freedom (US)

Leif Andreas Larsen DSO, DSC, CGM, DSM and Bar (9 January 1906 – 12 October 1990), popularly known as "Shetlands Larsen", was a highly decorated Norwegian sailor. He was arguably the most famous of the men who operated the Shetland bus escape route during the war.

He participated as a volunteer on the Finnish side during the Winter War and was a soldier in the defence of Norway following the German invasion at Kongsvinger Fortress. He had excellent leadership skills; one of the British officers at the Shetland base, David Howarth, described him as "one of the most remarkable personalities of the entire Second World War". Larsen preferred to downplay his own role and instead credited his crew for his achievements.

== Shetland bus ==
Larsen dramatically escaped Norway in February 1941 in the fishing boat MOTIG 1, a voyage he recounted in his autobiography. He then joined the "Norwegian Naval Independent Unit", an unwieldy cover title far better known as the Shetland bus. The unit, which operated under the Special Operations Executive (SOE) was, despite its name, initially independent of the regular Royal Norwegian Navy. He trained with the Linge Company.

He was the skipper of the fishing vessel Arthur during an attempt to sink the German battleship Tirpitz in the Trondheimsfjord in the fall of 1942 (Operation Title). Despite the raid's failure, Larsen received a Conspicuous Gallantry Medal, the first non-Briton to do so. The Admiralty records the operation as "the achievement of penetrating to within 10 miles (16 km) of the berth occupied by the Tirpitz represents, on the part of the personnel and particularly that of the Norwegians, a fine example of cold-blooded courage."

Boat skippers were initially given the nominal rank of petty officer ('quartermaster'), but Larsen was later, without a great deal of enthusiasm, given a formal commission as a Sub-lieutenant (Norwegian: fenrik) in the Royal Norwegian Navy. This explains how Larsen received his unusual array of British medals, including two normally only given to privates, as well as two normally only given to officers.

In all he made 52 trips to Norway in ordinary fishing boats, helping transfer agents in and out of Norway and provide them with weapons, radios and other supplies.

Operations became increasingly dangerous as the war progressed and the German forces improved their air and sea defences. They began to understand the true role of fishing-boats operating far from the coast and the fishing boats were phased out in favour of three American 'sub-chasers', which were much larger, faster and better-armed, altogether better suited to the changed circumstances. The commanders of these three vessels were required to be commissioned officers and Larsen became the captain of the HNoMS Vigra.

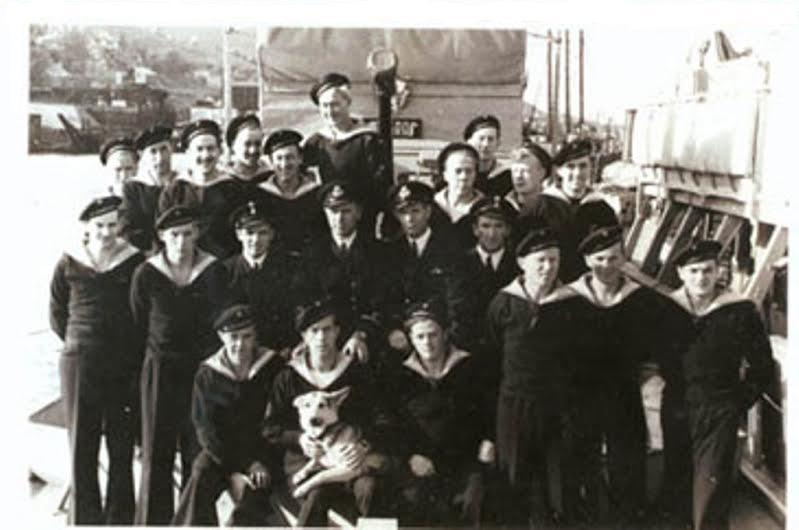
Leif Larsen with his crew on board the Vigra

== Honours and awards ==
With eleven orders, Larsen became one of the most highly decorated naval officers of the Second World War. In addition to the array of British decorations, he was awarded Norway's highest decoration for military gallantry, Krigskorset med Sverd or the War Cross with sword twice, in 1942 and 1943. He was one of only eleven people to receive this honour "The War Cross with Two Swords".

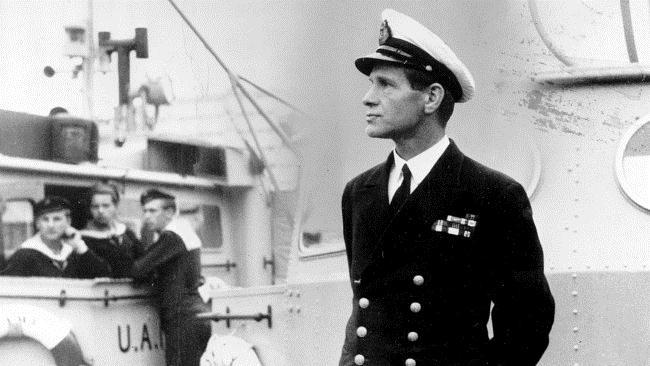
Leif Larsen, aka "Shetlands Larsen"

In 1995 a statue of him was erected by the sea in the centre of Bergen near the UNESCO site of Bryggen. In 2000 the Bergen newspaper Bergens Tidende named Larsen Vestlandet's man of the century. His medals are on display in The North Sea Traffic Museum in Telavåg.

Norwegian War Cross with two swords	St. Olav's Medal With Oak Branch	War Medal with three stars	
Defence Medal 1940–1945	Haakon VII 70th Anniversary Medal	Participation in the Winter War medal	Distinguished Service Order
Distinguished Service Cross	Conspicuous Gallantry Medal	Distinguished Service Medal and Bar	Medal of Freedom

== Post-war ==
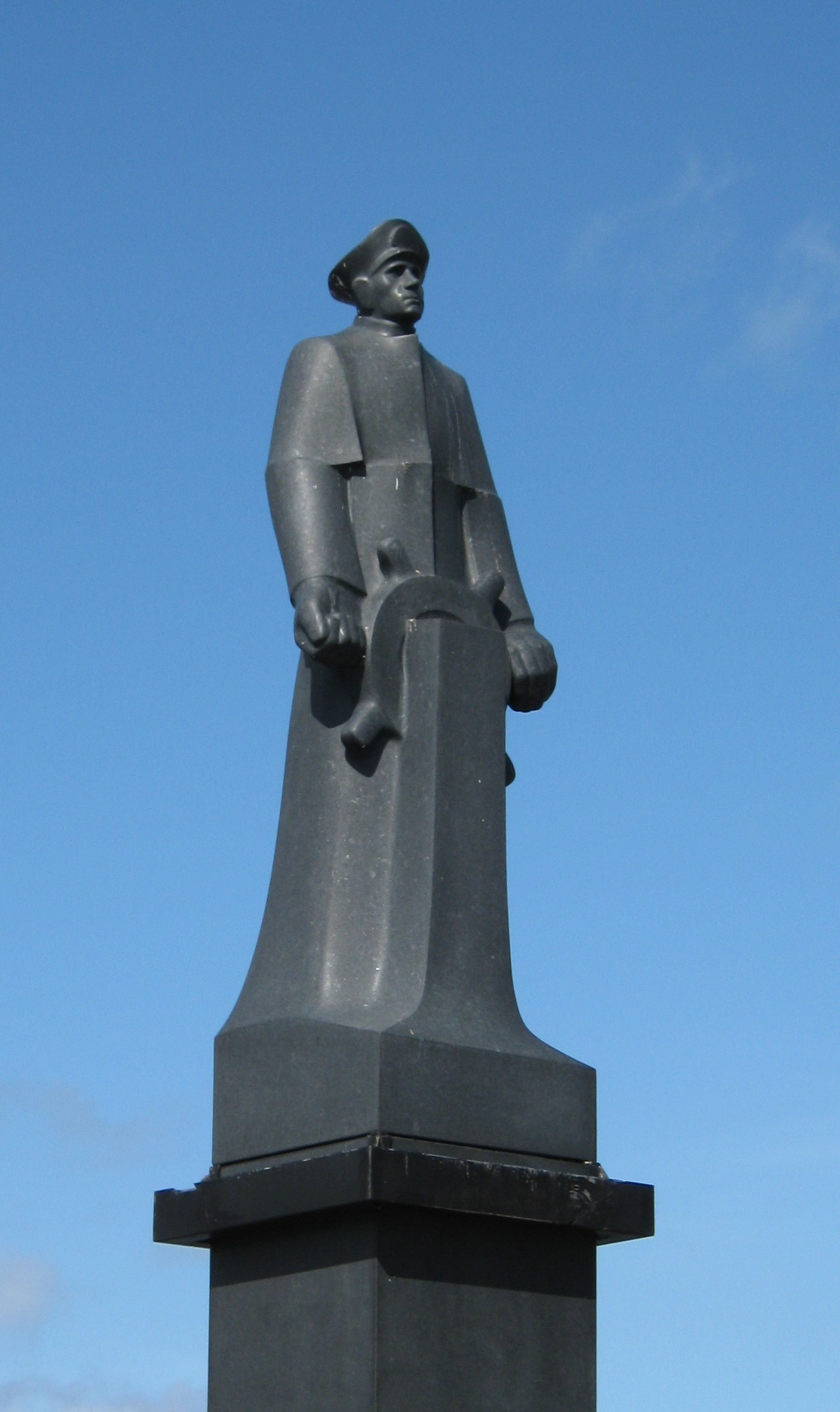
Statue of Leif Andreas Larsen on Bryggen in Bergen, his birthplace

After the war Larsen had a major role in organising the naval branch of the Norwegian Home Guard.

In 1947, the Norwegian author Frithjof Sælen published the book Shetlands-Larsen about Leif Larsen. The book was published in the United Kingdom under the title None but the Brave, and in France under the title Mission Suicide.

In 1954 Leif Larsen played himself in the movie Shetlandsgjengen (released as Suicide Mission in the United States). The film was based on Frithjof Sælen's book and historian David Howarth's book The Shetland Bus.

Larsen died from a stroke at the age of 84 in Bergen, Norway, on 12 October 1990. He was survived by his wife and three daughters.
