= Sclater (surname) =

Sclater may refer to:

- Arthur Sclater (1859 – 16 June 1882), Irish-born English cricketer
- Edith Sclater (1856–1927), British philanthropist
- Philip Lutley Sclater (1829–1913), English lawyer and zoologist
- William Lutley Sclater (1863–1944), the son of P.L. Sclater, British zoologist and museum director
- Arthur Sclater (Royal Marines officer) (1909–2002), British Royal Marines officer
