= The North Sea Traffic =

The North Sea Traffic (Norwegian: Englandsfarten) is the common name in Norway for the boats going between occupied Norway and Scotland and England during the Second World War. People that went with the boats were usually called "englandsfarere" (people traveling to England). The Shetland bus played a vital part of the voyages to and from Norway but other small boats made the crossing to escape the German occupation.

The voyages started early spring 1940 and around 3,293 persons managed to make their way to England and Scotland during the war and around 300 boats of various sizes, even some rowing boats participated. By decree by the German Reichskommissar Josef Terboven, it was punishable by death after 26 September 1941 to leave occupied Norway without authorisation; 51 Norwegians were eventually executed. Another 137 Norwegians died in the North Sea during passage to England or Scotland.

== Literature ==
- Sigurd Evensmo, Englandsfarere (1945) (English: "A Boat for England" (1947))
- David Howarth, The Shetland Bus (1951) (Norwegian: "Nordsjøbussen")
- James W. Irvine, The Waves are Free (1988) (Norwegian: "Men bølgene er jo fri")
- James W. Irvine, The Giving Years (1991)
- James W. Irvine, Final Curtain (2004)
- Kåre Iversen, I Was a Shetland Bus Man (1996), (reprinted 2004 as Shetland Bus Man)
- Erling Jensen & Ragnar Ulstein, Company Linge (1948)
- John MacRae of Kergord, Kergord House (1982)
- George Mikes, The Epic of Lofoten. London: Hutchinson, [194-]
- James R. Nicolson, Memories of The Shetland Bus (1984)
- James R. Nicolson, The Shetland Bus (1987)
- L. K. Schei & G. Moberg, The Shetland Story (1988)
- Willie Smith, Willie's War and Other Stories, Shetland Times Ltd. (2003) ISBN 978-1-898852-97-1
- Odd Strand, Hitra (1987) (in Norwegian)
- Trygve Sørvaag, Shetland Bus: Faces and Places 60 Years On (2002)
- Ragnar Ulstein, Englandsfarten (1965/67) (English: "The North Sea Traffic" (1992))

== See also ==
- Norway during World War II
- Shetland bus
- Telavåg
