= Shetland bus =

1941–45 Norwegian special operations unit

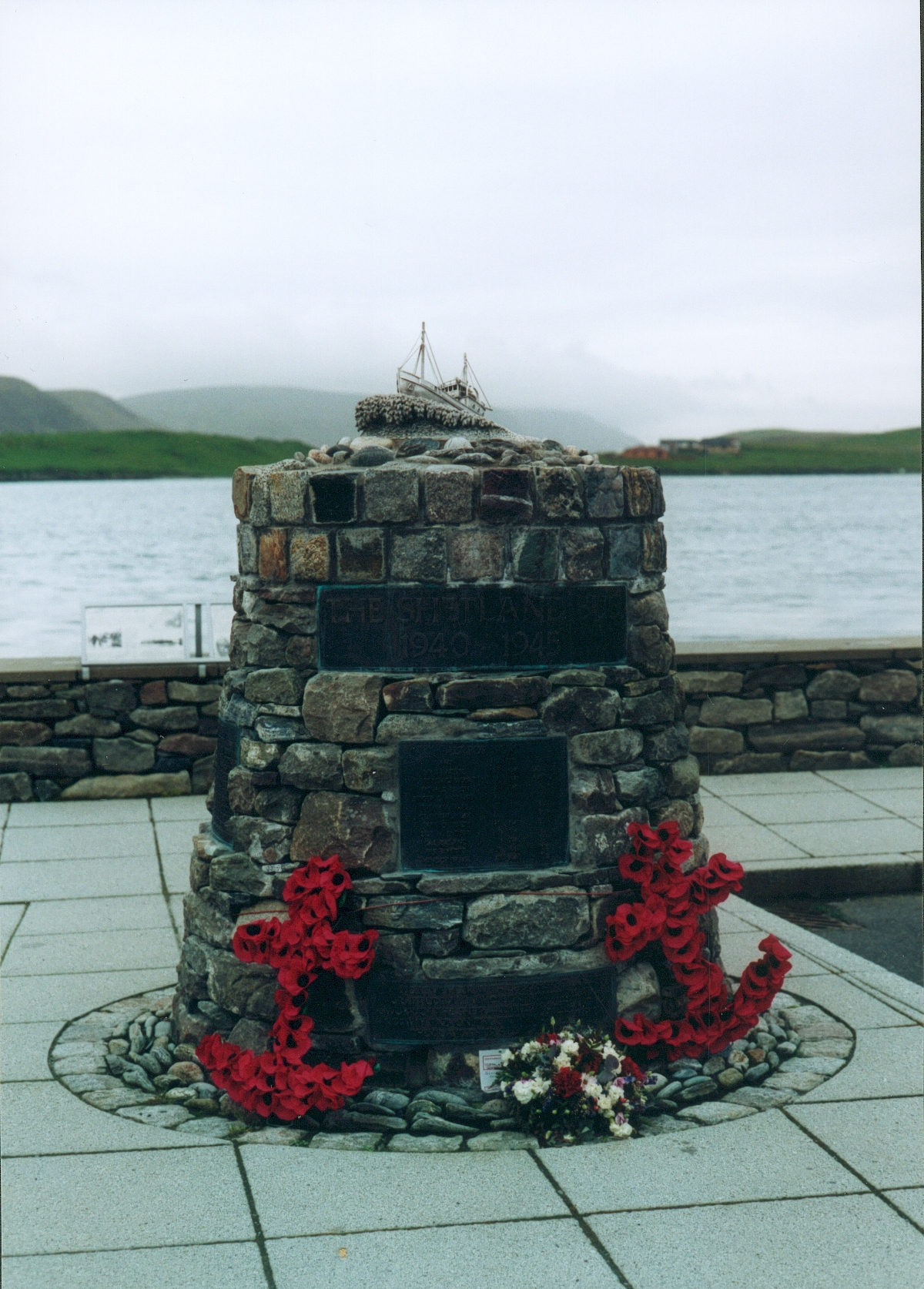
A memorial in Scalloway commemorating the Shetland Bus operation during the Second World War

The Shetland Bus (Norwegian Bokmål: Shetlandsbussene, def. pl.) was the nickname of a clandestine special operations group that made a permanent link between Mainland Shetland in Scotland and German-occupied Norway from 1941 until the surrender of Nazi Germany on 8 May 1945. This link transferred agents in and out of Norway and provided them with weapons, radios and other supplies. From mid-1942, the group's official name was the Norwegian Naval Independent Unit (NNIU). In October 1943, it became an official part of the Royal Norwegian Navy and was renamed the Royal Norwegian Naval Special Unit (RNNSU). The unit was operated initially by a large number of small fishing boats and later augmented by three fast and well-armed submarine chasers – Vigra, Hessa and Hitra.

Crossings were mostly made during the winter under the cover of darkness. This meant the crews and passengers had to endure very heavy North Sea conditions, with no lights and constant risk of discovery by German aircraft or patrol boats. There was also the possibility of being captured whilst carrying out the mission on the Norwegian coast.

Early on it was decided that camouflage was the best defence, and the boats were disguised as working fishing boats and the crew as fishermen. The fishing boats were armed with light machine guns concealed inside oil drums placed on deck. The operation was under constant threat from German forces, and several missions went awry, of which the Telavåg tragedy in spring 1942 was a prime example. Several fishing boats were lost during the early operations, but after receiving the three submarine chasers there were no more losses.

== History ==
=== Section D and the Cruising Clubs ===
Before Norway was invaded by the Germans, a unit within the British Secret Intelligence Service (SIS) called Section D operated a large section in Scandinavia. In 1938, it began recruiting from the ranks of the Royal Navy, and especially from the Royal Naval Volunteer Reserve (RNVR). In 1939, Frank George Griffith Carr, an accomplished yachtsman and recently recruited member of Section D seconded from the RNVR, created a small reconnaissance group known as the "Cruising Club" with S. August Courtauld and Gerard Holdsworth. Their mission was to survey the coasts of Norway, Denmark, Holland, and Belgium to identify potential landing sites for agents, sabotage equipment, and propaganda material.

In 1940, refugee Norwegian seamen who escaped to Shetland after the German invasion of Norway in 1940 coordinated with Section D to begin a more regular "bus" to ferry troops into Norway. Frank Carr went on to establish seaborne smuggling routes into occupied Norway, which formed the direct genesis of the Shetland Bus.

Mons Storemark, who fled Norway on 9 May 1940 as skipper of the Wailet, brought six refugees to Shetland and soon took part in Section D’s first and second Norwegian expeditions as pilot and skipper. Storemark fled Fedje with his family after the Sheriff told him to get out. Other early participants included Rubin Langmoe, a Norwegian naval reservist who joined the first Section D expedition with Karl Kronberg, and Otto Ferdinand Aksdal, who escaped from Norway with Olav Leirvåg and also took part in these initial missions.

On the Shetland side, John Scott Ratter, a local grocer and fisherman on the island of Yell, served as Section D’s contact with Norwegian smuggling vessels and maintained a secret explosives store near Whale Firth. His cooperation linked local resources with the emerging network of Norwegian operatives.

Later in 1940, due to political maneuverings, the head of Section D, Laurence Grand, was removed from his position and Section D was absorbed into the SOE. His political rival, Colin Gubbins, did all that he could after the war to ensure that history forgot Grand's contributions to the war effort. Despite Gubbins' ability to control the narrative, he did not invent the idea of the Shetland Bus, nor was it an invention of the SOE.

Frank Carr did not go into the SOE, he remained in SIS and worked several operations in Scandinavia, before being assigned the curatorship of the Royal Naval museum.

=== Norwegian arrival ===
When Germany launched Operation Weserübung, the invasion of Norway on 9 April 1940, French and British troops and ships were sent to help the Norwegians. Several coastal towns were bombed and destroyed by the Germans, and during April and May, the British ships had to retreat from mid-Norway. On 29 April, HMS Glasgow left the devastated city of Molde with King Haakon VII, Crown Prince Olav, members of the Norwegian Government, and most of the gold from the Norwegian National Bank. In northern Norway, the fighting lasted for another month. A few weeks after the occupation began, the first boats of an "armada" of fishing vessels and other boats began to arrive in Shetland. Some boats made several journeys across the North Sea carrying refugees.

Many of the boats were "Hardanger Cutters", with a straight bow and long stern from the Bergen area, others the more rounded "Møre Cutters", from the area around Ålesund. It appeared that the "Møre Cutter" was the strongest and best-fitted for the heavy weather in the North Sea. The boats were of many kinds and shapes, but most of those used as a "Shetland Bus", were from 50–70 feet (15–21 m) long, with two masts and equipped with a 30 to 70 hp single-cylinder semi-diesel engine, which made a characteristic "tonk-tonk" sound.

=== Formation ===
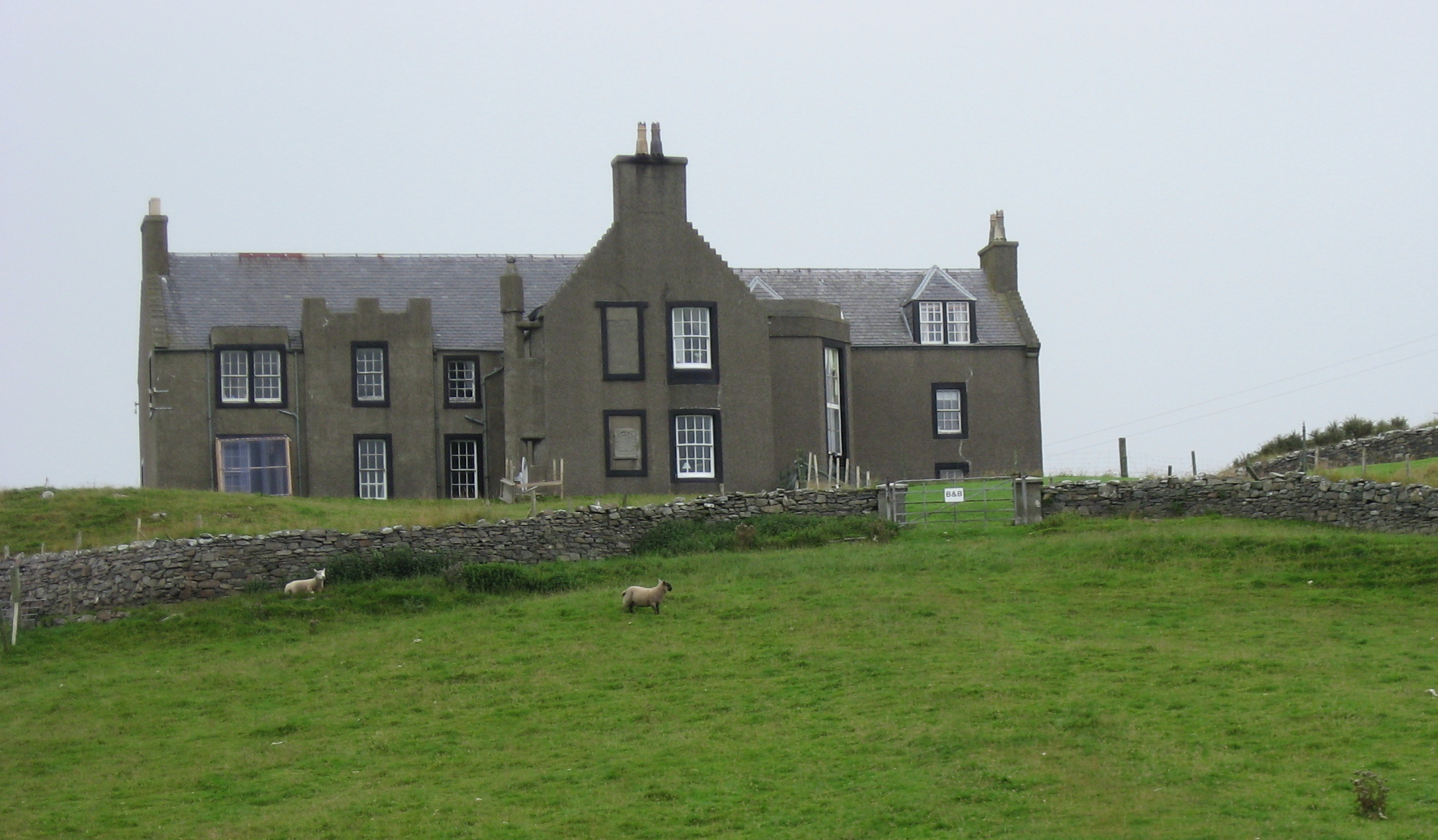
Lunna House in Shetland where operations were coordinated.

In late 1940, both the Secret Intelligence Service (SIS) and the Special Operations Executive (SOE) Norwegian Naval Independent Unit (not to be confused with another SOE Norwegian unit: the Norwegian Independent Company. No.1 or Kompani Linge), established a base in Lerwick (pronounced Lerrick); SIS later moved to Peterhead. They asked some of the skippers of the boats that were coming from Norway, if they would return to deliver agents and bring others back to Shetland. This went on throughout the winter of 1940–41. In early 1941 it was decided formally to establish a group of men and boats to assist the SIS and the SOE.

The main purpose of the group was to transfer agents in and out of Norway and provide them with weapons, radios and other supplies. They would also bring out Norwegians who feared arrest by the Germans. Sometimes the group was involved in special operations, like the failed attack on the German battleship Tirpitz, Operation Archery, the raids on Måløy and Operation Claymore in the Lofoten Islands.

The men put in charge of organising the group were a British Army officer, Major Leslie Mitchell and his assistant, Lieutenant David Howarth RNVR. Upon their arrival in Shetland they commandeered Flemington House, (later named "Kergord"), in Weisdale, for their headquarters and they found a perfect location in Lunna Ness north of Lerwick, from which the boats could operate. Before then the boats had been moored in Cat Firth. Lunna Ness had a sheltered harbour and a small population that were not too curious about what was going on and Lunna House was used as accommodation for the boat crews. Whilst Mitchell stayed in Flemington, Howarth set up headquarters in Lunna House. Their whole staff consisted of three British sergeants; Almond, Sherwood and Olsen; Norman Edwards, a stenographer; Harald Albertsen, a Norwegian cook at Lunna and two maids in Flemington. During the first winter Flemington House was used to train saboteurs and house agents and to accommodate Norwegian refugees. Later the refugees were received in a special camp at the James Sutherland Herring Factory in Lerwick, administered by James Adie and his Norwegian-born wife.

=== Facilities ===
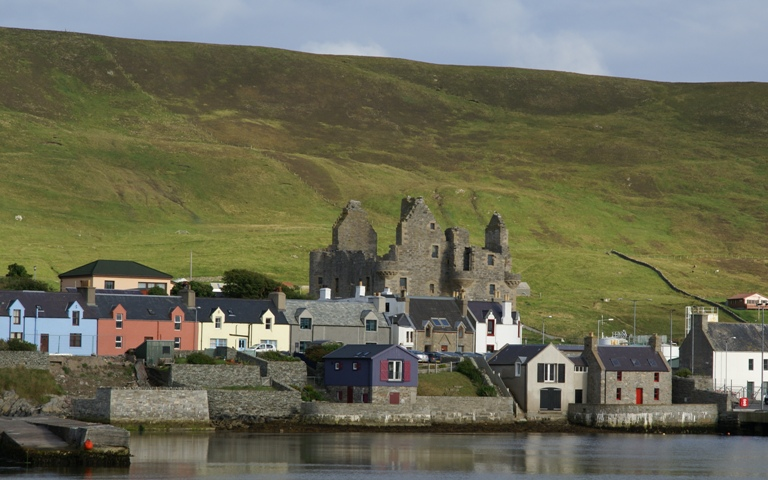
A 2008 image of Scalloway harbour, the wartime base of the Shetland Bus.

The lack of a slipway and other repair facilities meant that at first the boats had to be repaired at Malakoff's in Lerwick. Later, they moved the boats and crews to Scalloway, where William Moore & Son had a mechanical workshop and where "Prince Olav's Slipway" was built. Harald Angeltveit and Johan Haldorsen were the head mechanics and Severin Roald became leader of the carpenters. All ship repairs were done there but Lunna Voe was still used for preparing special operations.

Dinapore House was headquarters for the base in Scalloway, while Flemington House became quarters for agents awaiting transport to Norway and for de-brief on return. A former net loft, owned by Nicolson & Co. became accommodation for the boat crews and was named "Norway House". Sevrin Roald's wife, Inga Roald, was the housekeeper. Flemington House was also on occasion visited by high-ranking officers like the Commander-in-chief, Scottish Command and the Admiral Commanding Orkney and Shetland. The most prominent guest was HKH Crown Prince Olav of Norway who visited in October 1942. Mitchell left the base in Scalloway in December 1942 and Captain Arthur William Sclater, known as "Rogers", became leader of operations; his Norwegian-born wife, Alice, acted as welfare officer for the crews.

=== Operations ===
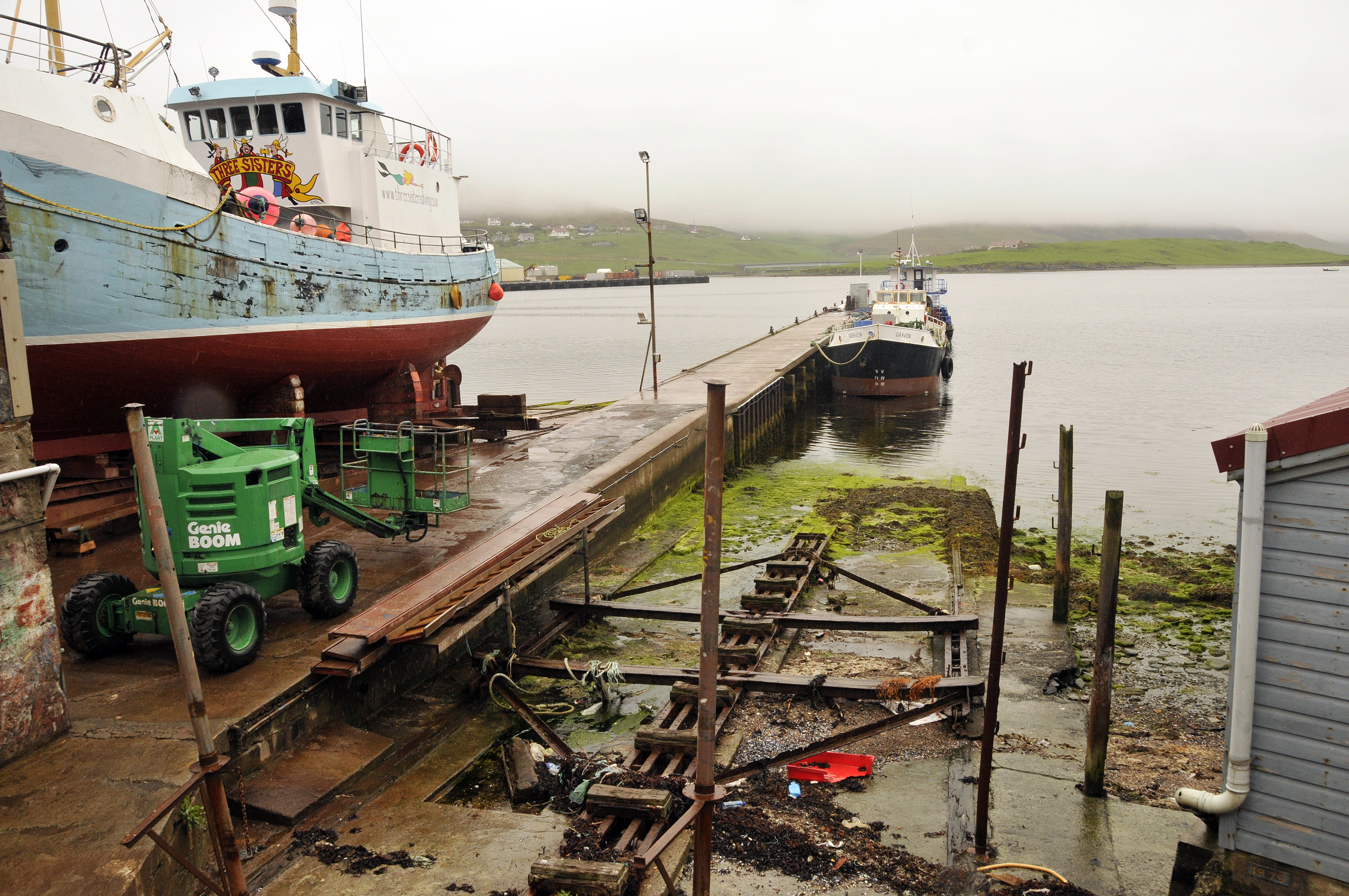
Prince Olav slipway in 2010

At first, there were fourteen fishing boats of various sizes. The original Shetland Bus boat, the Aksel, skippered by August Nærøy, departed for Bergen from Hamna Voe, on the west side of Lunna Ness, on 30 August 1941. The other crew on this first tour were Mindor Berge, Ivar Brekke, Andreas Gjertsen, and Bård Grotle. Fishing boats were used at first, but after some losses, it was decided that faster vessels were necessary. On 26 October 1943, the US Navy officially transferred the submarine chasers Hitra, Vigra, and Hessa to the Shetland Bus operation. These craft were 110 feet (34 m) long and powered by two 1,200 hp diesel engines, capable of a top speed of 22 kn (25 mph; 41 km/h), with a normal cruising speed of 17 kn (20 mph; 31 km/h). When the submarine chasers arrived, the group became an official part of the Royal Norwegian Navy and was renamed the Royal Norwegian Naval Special Unit (RNNSU).

- KNM Hitra was commanded by Ingvald Eidsheim.
- Vigra was commanded by Leif Larsen.
- Hessa was commanded by Petter Salen.

They carried out more than 100 tours to Norway, with no loss of men or ships.

On 9 May 1945, Vigra, commanded by Larsen, and Hitra, by Eidsheim, entered the harbour of Lyngøy near Bergen in free Norway. The group had made 198 trips to Norway in fishing boats and submarine chasers, Leif Larsen completing 52 of them. The "Shetland Bus" had transported 192 agents and 383 long tons (389 t) of weapons and supplies to Norway and had brought out 73 agents and 373 refugees. Forty-four members of the group were killed.

== Notable members ==
The crews of the Shetland Bus (Shetlandsgjengen) were men of the coast, fishermen and sailors with detailed local knowledge. Most came over after the occupation, some with their own vessels, others with vessels that were "stolen" with the owner's approval. They were young men, most of them in their twenties, some even younger. Many of them did several tours in the spring and summer of 1940, evacuating British soldiers who had been stranded in Norway after the Norwegian Campaign and other British citizens living in Norway.

=== Leif Larsen ===
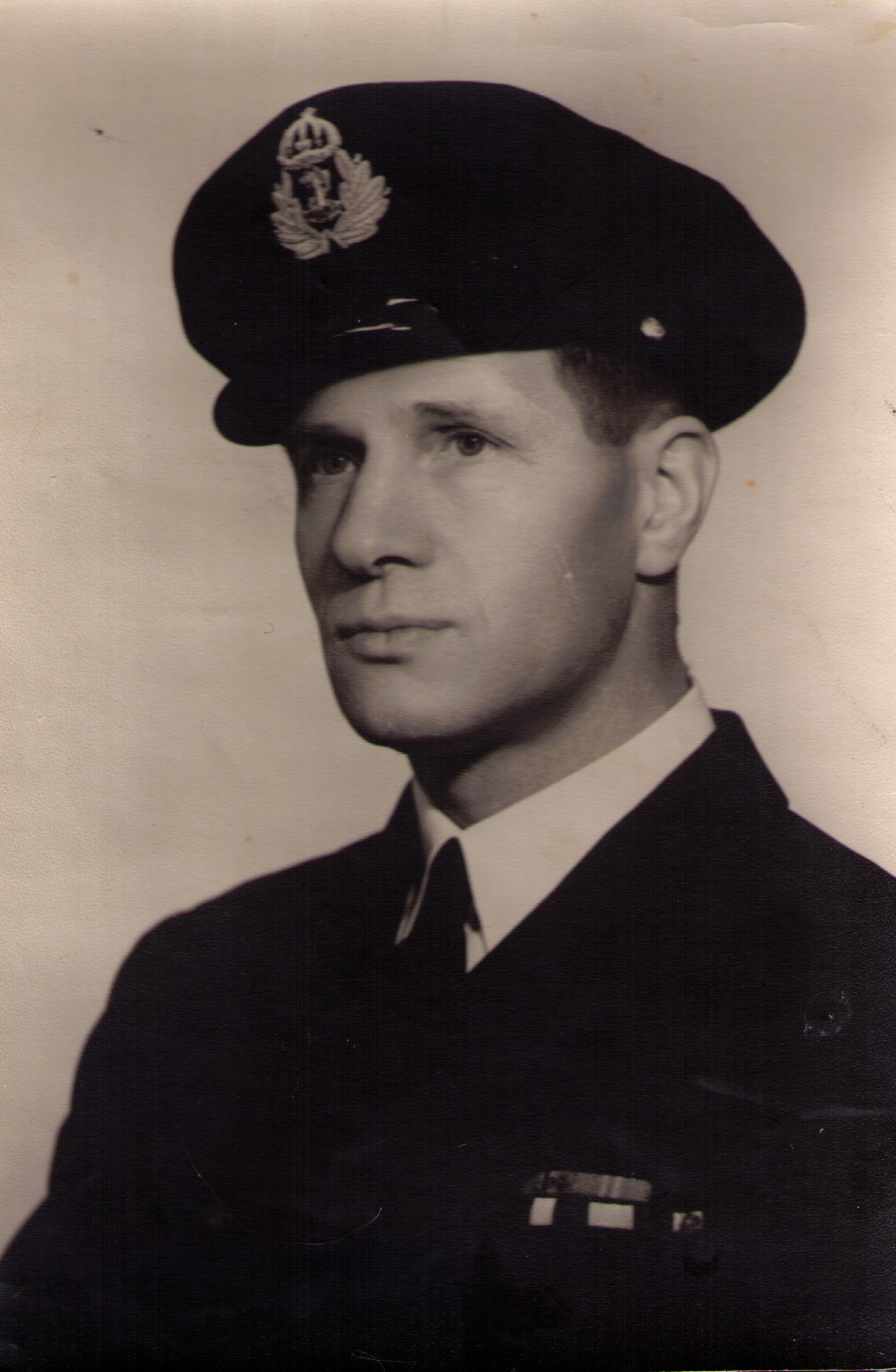
Shetlands Larsen, Norwegian leader of the "Bus" operations in World War II

Leif Larsen (9 January 1906 – 12 October 1990) nicknamed Shetlands Larsen, was perhaps the most famous of the Shetland Bus men. In all he made 52 trips to Norway and became the most highly decorated Allied naval officer of the Second World War. Larsen was born in Bergen, Norway and joined the Norwegian volunteers during the Finnish Winter War. Soon after the war in Finland ended, Norway was invaded by Germany. A Swedish officer, Benckert, set up a company of volunteers who made their way to Norway and fought in eastern Norway until 8 June 1940, until the end of war.

Larsen arrived in Shetland with the boat M/B Motig I, on 11 February 1941. After training with Kompani Linge in England and Scotland, Larsen returned to Lerwick in the St Magnus on 19 August 1941. He did his first Shetland Bus tour with M/B Siglaos, skippered by Petter Salen, on 14 September 1941. After the loss of the minelayer Nordsjøen, where Larsen was second in command, he became a skipper and could choose his own crew. His first crew was Palmer Bjørnøy, Leif Kinn, Arne Kinn, Kåre Iversen, Karsten Sangolt, Nils Nipen and Otto Pletten. His first boat was M/K Arthur, the boat that he had "requisitioned" on his escape from Norway, after the wrecking of Nordsjøen. On 8 November 1941, Larsen sailed from Shetland on his first tour as skipper. On their return to Shetland, they ran into a storm and Sangolt was blown overboard and drowned. Larsen made several tours with the Arthur but he also skippered other boats, like M/B Siglaos and M/B Feie. In October 1942, he had to scuttle the Arthur in Trondheimsfjord after a failed attempt to attack the German warship Tirpitz. He and the crew escaped to Sweden but a British agent, A.B. Evans, was arrested and later shot.

On 23 March 1943, returning from Træna, Nordland, with M/K Bergholm, they were attacked by German aircraft. The boat was sunk but Larsen and the crew, many of them wounded, rowed for several days until they reached the coast of Norway, near Ålesund, but Nils Vika died of his wounds. The other crew were: Andreas Færøy, Johannes Kalvø, Finn Clausen, Gunnar Clausen, Odd Hansen and William Enoksen. After hiding in different places, they were rescued on 14 April by a Motor Torpedo Boat (MTB 626) from Lerwick with Lieut. Bogeberg in command. In October 1943, the new submarine chasers arrived and Larsen became commander of Vigra, with the rank of Sub-Lieutenant. In total he made 52 tours to Norway in fishing vessels and submarine chasers.

British awards:

- Conspicuous Gallantry Medal
- Distinguished Service Medal and Bar
- Distinguished Service Cross
- Distinguished Service Order

Norwegian awards:

- War Cross with sword (Krigskors med sverd og stjerne)
- St Olav's medal (St. Olavsmedaljen med eikegren)
- Norwegian War Medal (Krigsmedaljen)
- Defence Medal 1940–1945 (Deltagermedaljen med rosett)

=== Kåre Iversen ===
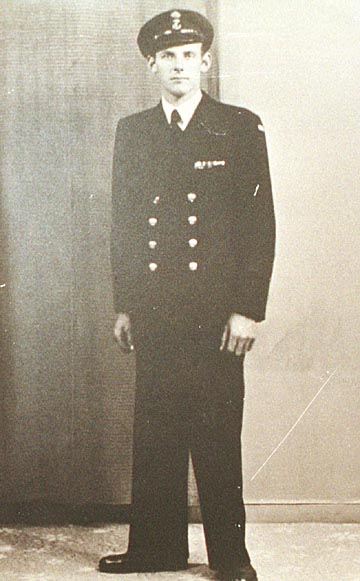
Kåre Iversen

Kåre Emil Iversen, (10 October 1918 – 22 August 2001), was born in Flatanger Municipality, Norway. He was the son of a sea pilot and had joined his father on the pilot boat. When the Germans attacked Norway he was a fisherman and soon joined the underground army. His activities were discovered by the Germans and he had to leave the country. He and three other men escaped to Shetland in August 1941 with his father's boat, the 42-foot Villa II. From Shetland he was transferred to England where he joined and trained with the Kompani Linge. He was among the men Larsen chose as crew on M/B Arthur and sailed several tours with Larsen. He was crewman on M/B Siglaos, M/B Feie, M/B Harald and M/B Heland. In December 1943, he joined the crew on the submarine chaser Hessa as engineer, under command of Petter Salen. When Hessa was under repair, Iversen served as engineer on Vigra and did one tour on a Norwegian Navy MTB. When Hessa was back again he rejoined the crew and stayed there until the war ended. Kåre Iversen did 57 tours across the North Sea, most of them as engineer. On 6 December 1944, he married the Scalloway girl Christine 'Cissie' Slater. They stayed in Scalloway after the war and had three daughters. In 1996, Shetland Times Ltd. published Iversen's memoirs, I Was a Shetland Bus Man, which was reprinted in 2004, with a new introduction and the title Shetland Bus Man.

== Memorials ==
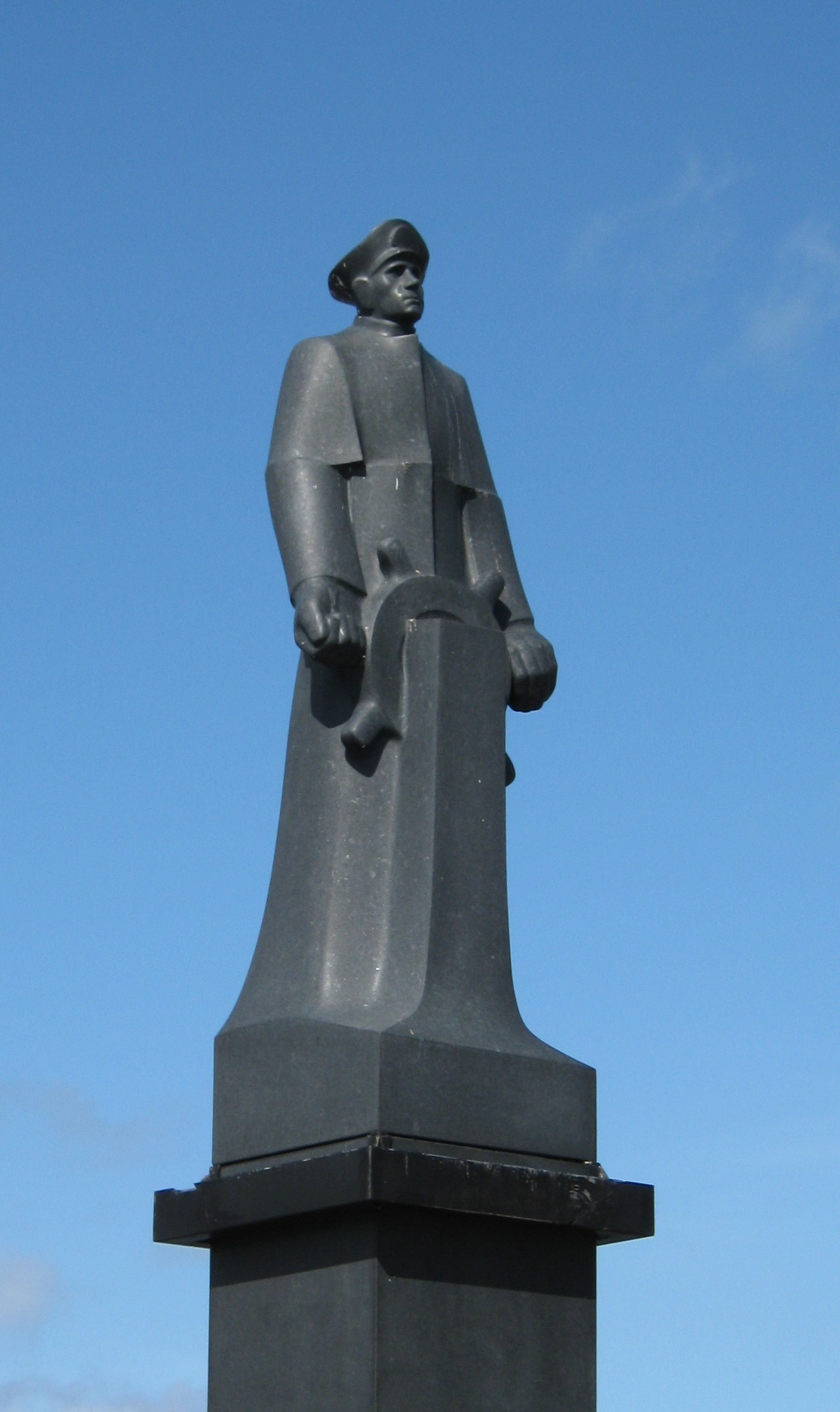
Statue of Leif Andreas Larsen in Bergen

The first of the Shetland Bus men to lose his life was Nils Nesse, 23, from Bremnes on the island Bømlo south of Bergen. He was killed on 28 October 1941, when German aircraft attacked the Siglaos on its way to Shetland from Norway. Nesse was buried at Lunna Kirk churchyard with a Scottish ceremony, because there was no Norwegian clergyman to conduct the funeral. His body was moved to his home in Norway in 1948 and a cross marks his grave at Lunna. Nesse was the second Norwegian buried at Lunna Kirk. The first was an unknown sailor buried on 5 February 1940. He was probably from the cargo ship Hop, that had left Bergen on 2 February 1940 and was torpedoed and sunk by a German submarine. The third man was buried 9 June 1942. He was found drifting in the sea by a local crofter, John Johnson from Lunna. The "Shetland–Norwegian Friendship Society" has set up a plaque on the churchyard wall in remembrance to these two unknown men. British naval officer, historian and author David Howarth (28 July 1912 – 2 July 1991) requested that his ashes be scattered over the water at Lunna Voe. A memorial plaque is mounted on the churchyard wall at Lunna Kirk.

The Shetland Bus Memorial is located at Scalloway, and the local museum has a permanent exhibition relating to the activities of the Shetland Bus. In 2018 Norwegian visitors were among those attending a service at the memorial to commemorate the 75th anniversary of an improvement in the safety of operations as a result of the introduction of new ships - the Hitria, Vigra and Hessa

== In popular culture ==
Films portraying the Shetland Bus include Shetlandsgjengen (1954; released as Suicide Mission in the United States) in which Leif Larsen played himself.

The Shetland Bus plays a role in the plot of mystery novel, Red Bones by Ann Cleeves, and in the BBC television series based on Cleeves' novels, Shetland, episodes 1 and 2, "Red Bones".

== See also ==
- Shetland bus boats
- The North Sea Traffic

== Other sources ==
- Howarth, David. (1998) [1951]. The Shetland Bus: A WWII Epic of Escape, Survival, and Adventure (2nd ed.). Lerwick: (Shetland Times Ltd.). ISBN 978-1-898852-42-1.
- Irvine, James W. (1991). The Giving Years: Shetland and Shetlanders, 1939–1945 (Shetland Publishing) ISBN 978-0906736159
- Iversen, Kaare (2000). Shetland Bus Man (Pentland Press Ltd) ISBN 978-1858218168
- Sælen, Frithjof (1973). None But the Brave: Story of "Shetlands" Larsen (HarperCollins) ISBN 978-0583121286
- Smith, Willie (2003). Willie's War and Other Stories (Shetland Times Ltd.) ISBN 978-1-898852-97-1
- Sørvaag, Trygve (2002). Shetland Bus: Faces and Places 60 Years On (Shetland Times Ltd) ISBN 9781898852889
