= Frithjof Sælen (writer) =

Norwegian writer and illustrator (1917–2004)

- Born: 24 December 1917; Bergen
- Died: 1 January 2004 (aged 86); Bergen
- Occupations: Writer, Illustrator, Resistance Fighter
- Spouse: Gerd Sundal
- Relatives: Father: Frithjof Sælen
- Writing career
- Notable works: Snorre Sel (1941); Tre kalde karer (1942); En motig maur (1948) "Shetlands Larsen" (1947) 'Tyske tanks var sør i dalen (1975)

Frithjof Sælen, Jr. (24 December 1917 – 1 January 2004) was a Norwegian writer, illustrator and member of the resistance during World War II.

== Early life ==
He was born in Bergen as the son of Frithjof Sælen (1892–1975) and Astrid Weltzin (1892–1978). His father was an accomplished gymnast, with an Olympic gold medal from 1912. Sælen Jr. was a swimmer during his youth. He took the examen artium in 1937, studied one year at commerce school and then moved to Oslo to study drawing and advertising.

== World War II ==
When World War II reached Norway on 9 April 1940, with the German invasion, he volunteered and fought for Norway in the ensuing battles. He joined Norwegian forces for the first time at Voss and fought in Hallingdal. After the capitulation of the regular Norwegian forces, he joined the secret resistance movement as a member of Milorg. Later he became the leader of Milorg., Bergen District, from 15 May 1943 until 26 February 1944 when he left the country.

In 1941 Sælen famously wrote and illustrated the book Snorre Sel ("Snorri the Seal"). The book, subtitled "A fable in colors for adults and children", was a subtle satire on Nazi Germany, and was widely read and later translated to several languages. It was soon banned by the Nasjonal Samling usurpant authorities. In 1942 he followed with Tre kalde karer ("Three Cold Fellows"), caricaturing the Axis Powers Germany, Italy and Japan. This book remained legal, but was sold under the counter in bookstores. He fled Norway in 1944, travelling the Norwegian Sea with Leif "Shetlands-Larsen" Larsen. In the United Kingdom he worked for the Norwegian High Command. He was decorated with the Defence Medal.

== Post-war life ==
In 1946 he married Gerd Sundal (b. 1918). He wrote a biography of Leif Larsen in 1947, Shetlands-Larsen. The book was also published in the United Kingdom under the title None but the Brave, and in France under the title Mission Suicide. The book sold well (500,000 copies by 2004) and along with Howarth's The Shetland Bus served as the source for the 1954 film in which Leif Larsen played himself – Shetlandsgjengen (released as Suicide Mission in the United States).

The children's book En motig maur ("A Brave Ant") followed in 1948. Sælen cited Walt Disney as his inspiration as an illustrator.

In 1975 he issued the book Tyske tanks var sør i dalen, about his fighting experiences. He also wrote the history of several Bergen-based companies. In addition to writing, he worked with marketing, establishing a marketing bureau Marketing-Byrået with a colleague in 1955, and a consulting company in 1974.

From 1994 until his death, he suffered from Parkinson's disease, and he spent his last year in a retirement home in Bergen. He died on New Year's Day 2004.
