= 1066 (book) =

1977 book by David Armine Howarth

1066: The Year of the Conquest
- First edition (UK)
- Author: David Armine Howarth
- Language: English
- Genre: History, nonfiction
- Published: 1977
- Publisher: Collins
- Publication place: UK
- Pages: 208

1066: The Year of the Conquest is a 1977 historical nonfiction book by David Armine Howarth. 1066 was the year of the Norman conquest of England culminating in the Battle of Hastings. The book spans the eventful year from Edward the Confessor's death to William the Conqueror's coronation.

== Reception ==
The Washington Post called the book "brilliantly imaginative", and lauded Howarth for avoiding presentism. Kirkus Reviews noted Howarth's "nostalgia for roughshod feudalism", and lack of "importantly new scholarship", but overall praised the energy of his narrative.
