= Lunna House =

Estate in Shetland Islands, Scotland

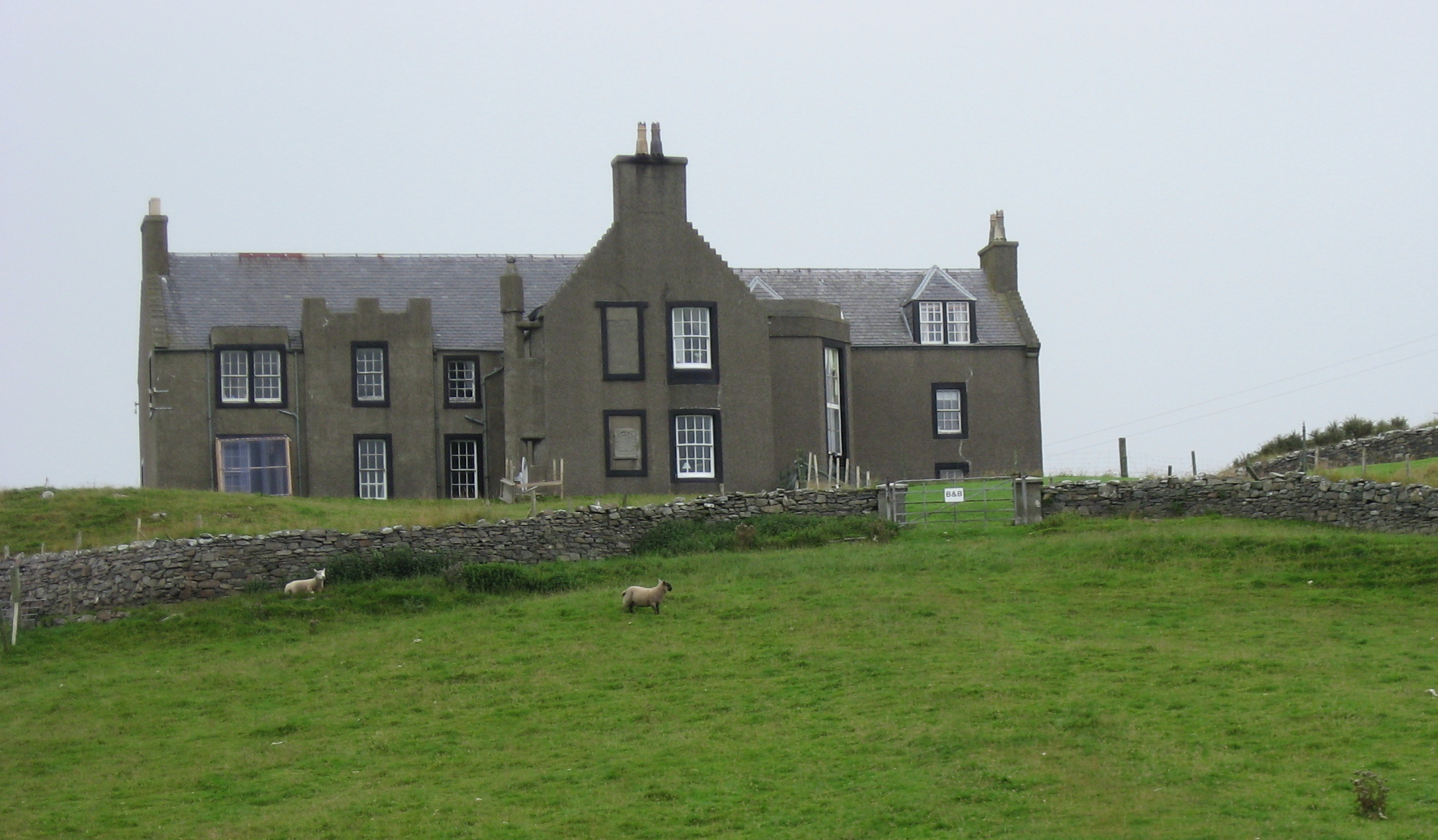
- Lunna House

- Location in the Shetland Islands
- 60.4042°N 1.1182°W

Listed Building – Category B
- Designated: 13 August 1971
- Reference no.: LB18591

Inventory of Gardens and Designed Landscapes in Scotland
- Official name: Lunna House
- Designated: 31 March 2003
- Reference no.: GDL00271

Lunna House (Shaetlan pronunciation: [ˌlɔnə ˈhus] LUH-nə HOOSE) is a 17th-century laird's house on Lunna Ness in the Shetland Islands. Lunna House is noted for having "the best historic designed landscape in Shetland". In the 20th century it was used as a base of the wartime Shetland Bus operation.

The house is protected as a category B listed building, and the grounds are included in the Inventory of Gardens and Designed Landscapes in Scotland, the national listing of significant gardens.

== History ==
Lunna House dates from before 1663 and was built on the site of a medieval haa (hall), which itself was built on the site of a Viking longhouse. The east side of the house (on the right in the picture) was built in the 1660s for Robert Hunter (d.1695). Robert was Chamberlain of the Lordship of Zetland, and a Commissioner of Supply. The house was extended in 1710, 1750, 1810, 1850 and finally between 1897 and 1910, when the south, north and west-sections of this cross-shaped house were built. The house is mainly constructed from stone and lime mortar, except for the newest section (1897-1910) which was made out of early cast concrete. The house was "harled" (covered in early concrete and pebble cladding ) around 1910 to hide the join between the concrete and thick stone sections of the house.

The stones for the original construction of the house are believed to have come from the ruins of an Iron Age broch; the remains of which lie behind the original stone gateway of the house, south of the building.

An armorial panel on the house commemorates the 1707 marriage of his son Thomas Hunter and Grisella Bruce, around which time this part of the house was added. In 1753, nearby Lunna Kirk was built by Robert Hunter (1710–1777), 3rd laird. Lunna Kirk is the oldest working Kirk (church) in Shetland.

The formal landscape around the house was laid out during the 18th century, and augmented in the 19th century with Gothic ornaments, such as the beach cobble finials of the gates to the south-west of the house. On the hilltop beyond the gates is a small folly, known as Hunter's Monument, which terminates the axis, and was formerly used as a lookout by the lairds. The harbour was also constructed in the 19th century, along with a walled garden and a lime kiln.

In 1845 Robina Hunter inherited the property. The following year she married Robert Bell, Sheriff at Lerwick, and a son of the surgeon Joseph Bell. Their son Robert Bell Hunter, 8th Laird of Lunna, sold the property in 1893 to John Bruce of Sumburgh. Bruce had the house extended in the 20th century.

During the Second World War, Lunna House was requisitioned by the UK War Office and became one of the bases of the Special Operations Executive (SOE). Following the invasion of Norway in May 1940, the house became the original base for the Shetland Bus, a clandestine operation to transfer men and materials between Shetland and Nazi-occupied Norway. The sheltered harbour at Lunna, away from populated areas, was considered ideal. Lieutenant David Howarth set up the SOE base at Lunna House, which accommodated the Shetland Bus boat crews. The Shetland Bus operation moved to Scalloway in 1942, but the SOE base remained until the end of the war. The beaches below the house were used for testing one-man submarines and other equipment, as part of the SOE activities.

By the end of the war, the house was in a poor condition. It was bought in the 1960s by the Lindsay family who rescued it from dereliction. Mains electricity reached the house in 1975. The Lindsays ran Lunna House as a B&B from the mid-1960s until 1997, when Mrs Ruby Lindsay retired, aged 89.

The house was listed in 1971, and in 1998 the Folly, West Gates, Gothick Cottage, and Walled Garden were also listed at category B, as integral parts of the designed landscape, and with a group value of category A.

Since 2001, the property has been owned by a family with wartime links to the SOE, and it has undergone further extensive renovations; repairing and replacing much of the sections of the slate roof, and internally repairing and restoring the fabric of the building.
