= Arthur Sclater (Royal Marines officer) =

- Born: Arthur William Sclater; 11 November 1909; Newick Park, Sussex, United Kingdom
- Died: 7 June 2002 (aged 92)
- Occupations: Landowner, wood pulp agent, Royal Marines officer
- Known for: Commander, "Shetland bus"

Arthur William Sclater (11 November 1909 – 7 June 2002) was a British land owner and businessman. He was a Royal Marines officer during World War II and served as commander of the "Shetland bus" between 1942 and 1945, a group that maintained a supply line and escape route to the Norwegian resistance fighters.

== Early life and career ==
Sclater was born on 11 November 1909 at Newick Park in Sussex to the Reverend Francis Sanderson Sclater and Norwegian-born Hedda Beer. He was educated at Charterhouse School then Gonville and Caius College, Cambridge, spending his summers in Norway. He married Norwegian-born Alice Collet (1913–2005) in 1936 and they had two sons.

After working for the Anglo-Mexican Petroleum Company in Brazil, Turner's Asbestos Cement in Rochdale, Lancashire, and C Tennant and Sons in London, he became a wood pulp agent for Berner, Nicol and Company.

== Military service ==
He was denied enlistment in the Royal Marines following the outbreak of World War II as a wood pulp agent was considered a reserved occupation vital to the war effort; he was released from his reserved occupation in 1941 and enlisted in the Royal Marines. As Norwegian speakers, Sclater and his wife were identified to support the Special Operations Executive, which maintained a base in Shetland and a link with the resistance in German-occupied Norway, known as the "Shetland bus". Sclater was therefore stopped from boarding a troop train at London Charing Cross to go to Singapore and he was reassigned to the base. After serving as adjutant, he became commander of the base in 1942, overseeing the shuttling of arms, equipment, agents, wireless operators and resistance fighters to and from Norway. Initially operated by Norwegian fishing boats crewed by Norwegian sailors, motor torpedo boats were later used and in 1943, the United States Navy assigned three submarine chasers which "transformed" Sclater's operations. To protect relations in Norway Sclater and his wife adopted the pseudonym Rogers, the name of his brother's spaniel.

For his role, Sclater received the Norwegian honour the King Haakon VII Freedom Cross and the United States Medal of Freedom with bronze palm.

After the war ended in 1945, Sclater initially returned to his work as a wood pulp agent, and set out to restore the family estate at Newick. He died on 7 June 2002.
