= Suicide Mission (film) =

1954 British-Norwegian film directed by Michael Forlong

- Directed by: Michael Forlong
- Screenplay by: David Howarth; Michael Forlong; Sidney Cole (as Sydney Cole)
- Based on: From the book The Shetland Bus by David Howarth
- Produced by: Michael Forlong; W.M. Rolfsen
- Starring: Leif Larsen
- Cinematography: Per Jonson
- Edited by: Lee Doig
- Music by: Dolf van der Linden
- Color process: Black and white
- Production companies: Nordsjøfilm; North Sea
- Distributed by: Columbia Pictures
- Release dates: 14 October 1954 (Norway); November 1956 (USA)
- Running time: 70 minutes
- Countries: United Kingdom; Norway
- Language: English

Suicide Mission (also known as Shetlandsgjengen and The Shetland Bus) is a 1954 British-Norwegian war film directed by Michael Forlong and starring Leif Larsen. It was written by David Howarth, Forlong and Sidney Cole, based on Howarth's 1951 book The Shetland Bus.

== Synopsis ==
The true story of the Shetland bus, the clandestine traffic across the North Sea from German-occupied Norway to Shetland during the Second World War. A small group of Norwegian sailors loosely connected to the British Royal Navy take refugees from Norway to Shetland in small fishing boats, equipped only with small arms to protect themselves from German aircraft and patrol boats. The film is closely based on real events, and many of the members of the group, including the leader, known as "Shetlands-Larsen", play themselves.

== Cast ==
- Leif Larsen as himself
- Palmar Bjørnøy as himself
- Anthony Oliver as narrator
- Johannes Kalve as himself
- William Enoksen as himself
- Odd Hansen as himself
- Finn Clausen as himself
- Gunnar Klausen as himself
- Harald Albertson as himself
- Carsten Johnsen as himself
- Karl Johan Aarsæther as himself
- Sigvald Fivelsdal as himself
- Paul Kråknes as himself
- Øivind Steinsvåg as himself
- Johan Haldorsen as himself
- Willy Rye Andersen as himself
- Helge W. Fonneland as himself
- Michael Aldridge as a British naval officer
- T.W. Southam as British admiral
- Per Skift as Bård Grotle
- Oscar Egede-Nissen as Peter Salen
- Atle Larsen as Johan
- Torborg Schønberg as old lady
- Haakon Særsten as home front man
- Mona Levin as Carla, a Jewish refugee

== Production ==
According to The Monthly Film Bulletin, the film cost £25,000.

== Release ==
The ceremonial premiere for the royal family took place in 1954. It has been claimed that the "world premiere" took place in the gymnasium in the basement of Rubbestadnes Folkeskule.

== Reception ==
The Monthly Film Bulletin wrote: "Like The Battle of Heavy Water, the earlier Norwegian/French production based on a true story of the resistance, this version of David Howarth's The Shetland Bus has reached us in a somewhat mutilated form. Re-edited, cut and dubbed for the British and American markets, it now consists of a string of loosely connected action sequences with some decidedly sketchy characterisation of the men involved, most of whom play themselves. Even at this move, however, the sober handling of Michael Forlong (a young New Zealand director who has made several films in Norway) remains noteworthy. His documentary training is clearly visible in the lengthy storm sequence (one of the most vivid yet recorded on film) and in the staging of the German air attack on the fishing vessel and the ensuing scenes in the open boat. ... Elsewhere, the most obvious weaknesses are a certain overall flatness in the script and dialogue and unequal handling of the non-professional players. But, for all its signs of inexperience, this hommage to heroic deeds is presented without empty rhetoric or false pomp. And that is something to be grateful for."

The Daily Film Renter wrote: "This appealing, life-like story of Anglo-Norwegian co-operation during the war has been straightforwardly and simply made and creates an atmosphere of truth to life. It is a reminder of inspiring actions done by ordinary folk who became temporary heroes. In its very simplicity, it holds attention and wins audience sympathies and will prove a useful booking for double-billing in general situations"

Variety wrote: "Forlong has succeeded in a realistic treatment of his subject, in which the camera work of Per G. Jonson and Mattis Mathieson registers stirringly. Leif Larsen, one of the Norwegian captains during the gruelling days of the blockade running, portrays himself as an interesting figure. Balance of pro actors include Michael Aldridge, Atle Larsen, Per Christensen, T. W. Southam and Oscar Egede Nissen, each contributing to excellence of the story development. Howarth, Sidney Cole and Forlong's script-adaptation is a slick job of adventuring."

== See also ==
- List of British films of 1954
