= Karl Topp =

German naval officer (1895–1981)

Friedrich Karl Topp (29 September 1895 – 24 April 1981) was a naval officer in Germany during both World Wars.

== Biography ==
Topp was born in Voerde in the Prussian Rhine Province. His father was a minister. He joined the Imperial German Navy in 1914 and took part in World War I in the U-Boat service. At the end of the war he was a first officer of SM UC-67 under the command of Martin Niemöller. After the war he was transferred to the Reichsmarine.

In the Third Reich he was Generalreferent (chief-official in charge) for military problems of shipbuilding, later on chief of military department at the main office of warship building, an administrative body of the Marineamt (highest command of the Kriegsmarine) and from 15 January 1941 to 24 February 1943 as Kapitän zur See (KzS, captain) the first commander of the German battleship Tirpitz. Later, he was the chairman of the commission for shipbuilding reporting to the Reichsminister für Rüstung und Kriegsproduktion Albert Speer (Minister of Armament and War Production); his last rank was Vizeadmiral (vice admiral). After the war the British Army engaged him some months for winding up the German shipyards. In 1946 he was released from being a prisoner-of-war. After this, for nearly ten years he worked as a commercial representative, living in Jever, Lower Saxony, where he died after retirement.

== Bibliography ==
- Martin Niemöller: Vom U-Boot zur Kanzel. Edition 3, Warneck, Berlin 1937
- Ludovic Kennedy. Menace: The Life and Death of the Tirpitz. London: Sidgwick & Jackson, 1979. ISBN 0-7221-5165-9, ISBN 0-283-98494-5
