= Telavåg =

Village in Øygarden Municipality, Norway

Telavåg Tælavåg (unofficial)
- Village
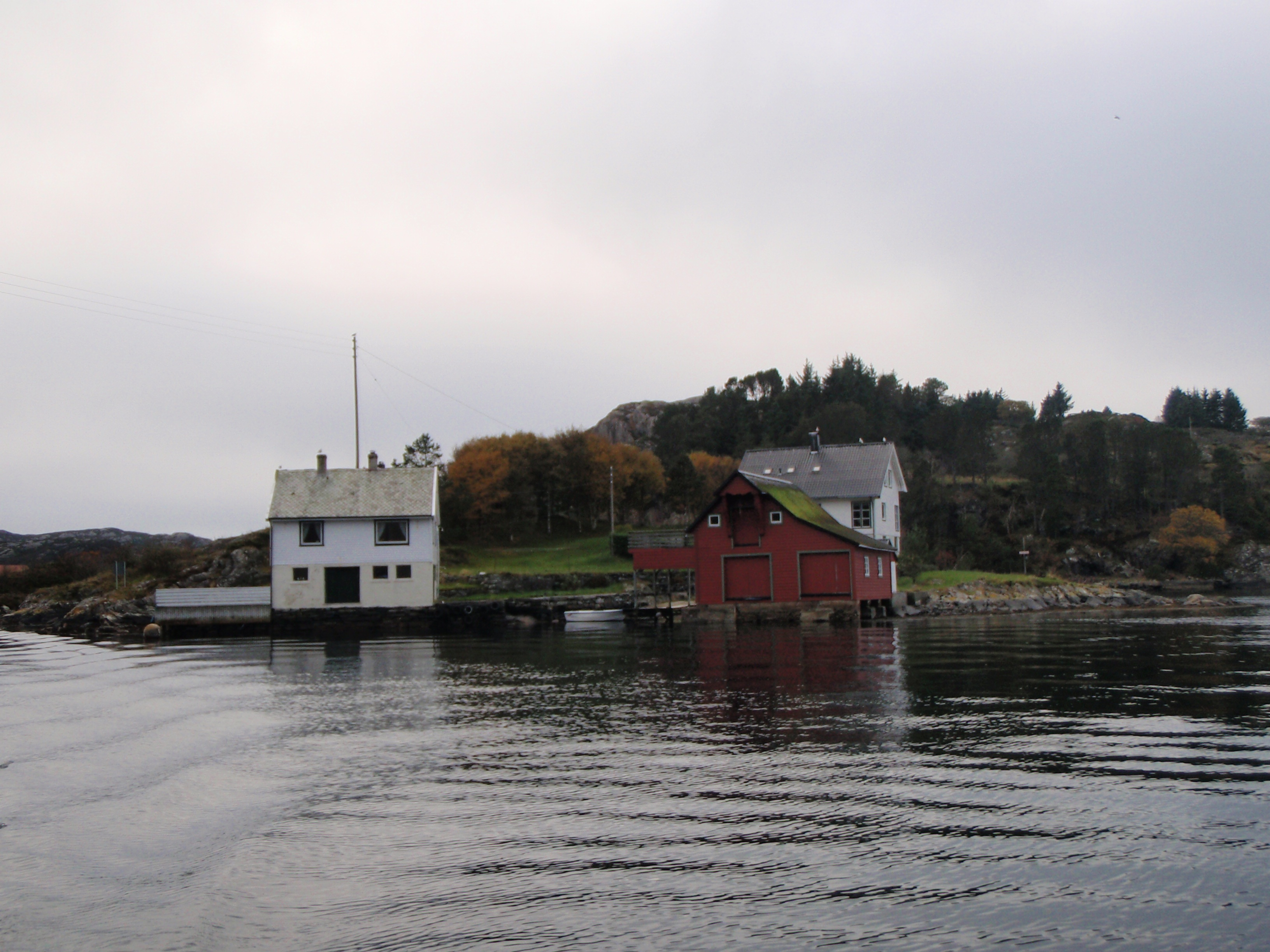
- View of the coastal area near Telavåg
- Interactive map of Telavåg
- Coordinates: 60.26291°N 4.98627°E
- Country: Norway
- Region: Western Norway
- County: Vestland
- District: Midhordland
- Municipality: Øygarden Municipality

Area
  - Total: 0.76 km^{2} (0.29 sq mi)
- Elevation: 24 m (79 ft)

Population (2025)
  - Total: 610
  - Density: 803/km^{2} (2,080/sq mi)
- Time zone: UTC+01:00 (CET)
  - Summer (DST): UTC+02:00 (CEST)
- Post Code: 5380 Tælavåg

Telavåg is a village in Øygarden Municipality in Vestland county, Norway. The village is located on the island of Sotra, about 39 kilometres (24 miles) southwest of the city of Bergen. The 0.76-square-kilometre (5/16 sq mi) village has a population (2025) of 610 and a population density of 803 inhabitants per square kilometre (2,080/sq mi).

== History ==
=== Telavåg tragedy ===
During the occupation of Norway by Nazi Germany, Telavåg played an important role in the secret North Sea boat traffic between Norway and Great Britain. The village was the scene of the Telavåg Tragedy in the spring of 1942, during World War II.

On 26 April 1942, after having discovered that some of the inhabitants of Telavåg were hiding two men from the Linge company, Arne Meldal Værum and Emil Gustav Hvaal, the Gestapo arrived to arrest the Norwegian officers. Shots were exchanged, and two prominent German Gestapo officers (Kriminalrat Gerhard Berns and Kriminalsekretär Henry Bertram) were shot dead. Arne Værum was also killed in the incident. Emil Hvaal and his son were executed a few months later.

Reichskommissar Josef Terboven personally oversaw the Nazi reprisal, which was quick and brutal. On 30 April, as the villagers were watching, all buildings were destroyed, all boats were sunk or confiscated, and all livestock taken away. All men in the village were either executed or sent to the Nazi concentration camp at Sachsenhausen. Of the 72 who were deported from Telavåg, 31 were murdered in captivity. Women and children were imprisoned for two years. 18 Norwegian prisoners (unrelated to Telavåg) held at the Trandum internment camp were also executed as a reprisal. Though smaller in scale, this atrocity is often compared to similar events at Lidice in the Czech Republic and Oradour-sur-Glane in France.

== Attractions ==
=== North Sea Maritime Museum ===
The North Sea Maritime Museum in Telavåg (Nordsjøfartmuseet i Televåg) opened on 26 April 1998. It is a modern building with a cinema theater seating 100 people and a conference room. The permanent exhibition of the North Sea Traffic Museum deals with the Telavåg tragedy. The museum also exhibits the North Sea Traffic and features Leif Larsen, who was a central person in this traffic that became known as "Shetland-Larsen".

== See also ==
- Shetland bus
