= David Howarth (author) =

British naval officer, boatbuilder, historian and author

- Born: David Armine Howarth; 28 July 1912; Kensington
- Died: 2 July 1991 (aged 78); Hailsham
- Burial place: Lunna Voe, Shetland
- Education: University of Cambridge
- Military career
- Allegiance: United Kingdom
- Branch: Navy
- Rank: Lieutenant Commander
- Unit: Special Operations Executive
- Other work: Boatbuilder, historian and author

David Armine Howarth (28 July 1912 – 2 July 1991) was a British naval officer, boatbuilder, historian and author.

== Biography ==
=== Early life and career ===
Howarth was born in Kensington. His father worked first for the Admiralty then as Secretary of the British Association for the Advancement of Science. Howarth attended prep school in Horsham and public school in Tonbridge.

After graduating from the University of Cambridge in physics and maths, he first worked for John Logie Baird designing circuits for the developing technology of television. He then joined the BBC, working in sound recording, with Richard Dimbleby, pioneering outside broadcasts, including at the fire that destroyed Crystal Palace. He used holidays to explore and become familiar with the language and culture of Norway.

=== World War II ===
Howarth and Richard Dimbleby became the first war correspondents for BBC radio at the start of World War II. He left the BBC and joined the Navy in 1940 after the fall of France. He served initially as a Petty officer at Lowestoft, then was commissioned into the RNVR and posted to Scapa Flow as Flag Lieutenant to the Admiral Commanding, Orkneys and Shetlands, Rear Admiral Sir Hugh Binney.

From there, he was recruited in 1941 by the Secret Intelligence Service and Special Operations Executive (SOE) and helped set up the Shetland Bus, an SOE operation crewed by Norwegians running a clandestine route between Shetland and Norway. He was second in command at the Naval base in Shetland, first based at Lunna House then subsequently mainly at Scalloway, and stayed in this role for the remainder of the war. He arranged operations with the relevant authorities, procured the necessary equipment (including developing innovative ways of arming and disguising the fishing boats used for the first two years of operations), and took particular care over the needs of the Norwegian sailors undertaking the missions. For his contributions to espionage operations against the German occupation of Norway, he received King Haakon VII's Cross of Liberty. The King also made Howarth a Chevalier First Class of the Order of St Olav. He finished the war as a Lieutenant Commander.

Of his role in the Shetland Bus, he wrote:

Of all the jobs I ever heard of in war, that would have been my first choice: boats, Norway, individuality and independence, yet with the status of a naval officer - a job that was unique and had no precedent, either in peace or war, yet was certainly useful, if anything whatever in war can be said to be useful.

=== Post war ===
After the war, Howarth initially stayed in Shetland and started a boat-building business. He started writing, including a memoir of the Shetland Bus; the proceeds from this enabled him to pay off the debts of the business, which was not financially successful. During this period he also undertook occasional projects for the Secret Intelligence Service.

He then moved to England, and wrote numerous books, often on naval and military history, and often following in-depth investigations overseas. In 1962, he stayed with the 14th Dalai Lama at Dharamshala in order to edit his first autobiography, My Land and My People. He also made some travel documentaries for the BBC.

=== Personal life ===
Howarth was married first to Nanette, from Shetland, for over twenty years. They had six children. After the marriage ended, he married Joanna White in 1981.

Howarth died on 2 July 1991 at Hailsham at the age of 78. At his request, his ashes were scattered over the waters of Lunna Voe, Shetland, near Lunna House, the first base of the Shetland Bus operation.

== Bibliography ==
=== Novels ===
- Group Flashing Two (1952)
- One Night in Styria (1953)
- Thieves' Hole (1954)

=== Non-fiction ===
Autobiographies

- Pursued by a Bear: An Autobiography (1986)

Biographies

- We Die Alone: A WWII Epic of Escape and Endurance (1955)
- The Desert King: A Life of Ibn Saud (1964)
- Great Britons (1978)
- Wellington Commander: The Iron Duke's Generalship (1985), with John Keegan and Paddy Griffith
- Nelson: The Immortal Memory (1988), written with his son Stephen Howarth
  A comprehensive biography of Britain's most famous Admiral.

History

- The Shetland Bus: A WWII Epic of Escape, Survival, and Adventure, or Across to Norway (1951)
- The Sledge Patrol: The True Story of the Strangest Battle Front of All, or The Sledge Patrol: A WWII Epic of Escape, Survival, and Victory (1957)
- Dawn of D-Day: These Men Were There, 6 June 1944 (1959)
  An account of the landing in Normandy, with many observations from participants.
- Panama: Four Hundred Years of Dreams and Cruelty, or The Golden Isthmus (1966)
- Waterloo: A Near Run Thing, or Waterloo: Day of Battle (1968)
  Analysis of the Battle of Waterloo, from the reports of those who fought it.
- Great Escapes (1969)
- Trafalgar: The Nelson Touch (1969)
  Account of the Battle of Trafalgar, between the navies of France and Great Britain in 1805.
- Sovereign of the Seas: The Story of British Sea Power or British Sea Power: How Britain Became Sovereign of the Seas (1974)
  The story of British sea power.
- Waterloo: A Guide to the Battlefield, or Waterloo: A Guide (1974)
- The Greek Adventure (1976)
  Narrative describing the Greek War of Independence in the 1820s.
- 1066: The Year of the Conquest (1977)
  A historical narrative of the personalities and events of 1066 AD and how they changed Britain.
- The Dreadnoughts (1979), part of The Seafarers Series
  A look at the development and use of battleship technology in the First World War.
- The Men-of-War (1978), part of The Seafarers Series, in association with Time-Life editors, published by Time-Life Books
  Sailing war-ships from the 16th to 18th centuries.
- Famous Sea Battles (1981)
- The Voyage of the Armada, or The Voyage of the Armada: The Spanish Story (1981)
  An account of the Spanish Armada of 1588, seen mostly from the Spanish perspective. Much of the account references newly available Spanish material.
- Tahiti: A Paradise Lost (1983), pub. Harvill Press
  The decline of Tahiti, from its discovery by H.M.S. Dolphin in June 1767
- The Story of P&O: The Peninsular & Oriental Steam Navigation Company (1986), with Stephen Howarth

True events

- The Shadow of the Dam (1961)

== Adaptations ==
- Suicide Mission (1954), film directed by Michael Forlong, based on book The Shetland Bus: A WWII Epic of Escape, Survival, and Adventure, and also on book None but the Brave by Frithjof Sælen
- Nine Lives (1957), film directed by Arne Skouen, based on book We Die Alone: A WWII Epic of Escape and Endurance
