= History of Shetland =

Scottish regional history

The History of Shetland concerns the subarctic archipelago of Shetland in Scotland. The early history of the islands is dominated by the influence of the Vikings. From the 14th century, it was incorporated into the Kingdom of Scotland, and later into the United Kingdom.

== Prehistory ==
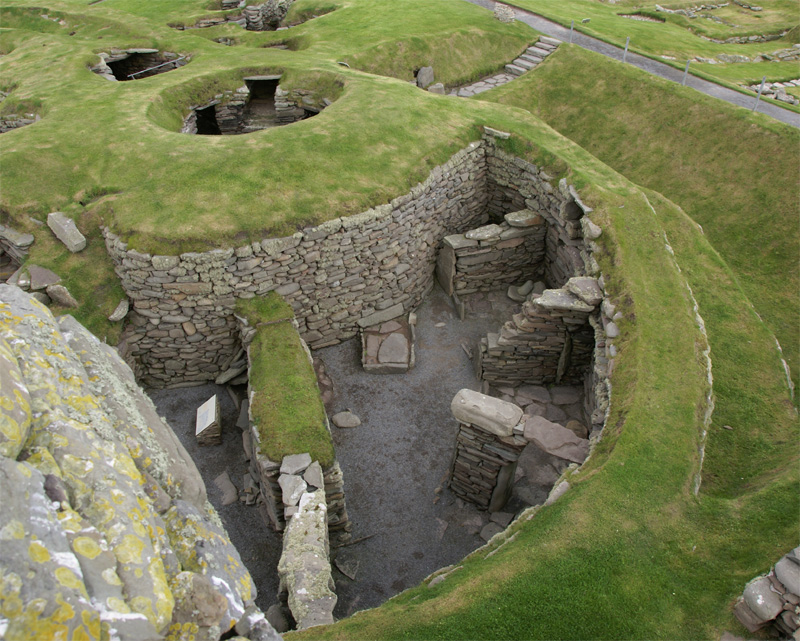
The preserved ruins of a wheelhouse and broch at Jarlshof, described as "one of the most remarkable archaeological sites ever excavated in the British Isles".

Due to building in stone on virtually treeless islands—a practice dating to at least the early Neolithic Period—Shetland is extremely rich in physical remains of the prehistoric era, and there are over 5,000 archaeological sites. A midden site at West Voe on the south coast of Mainland, dated to 4320–4030 BCE, has provided the first evidence of Mesolithic human activity in Shetland.

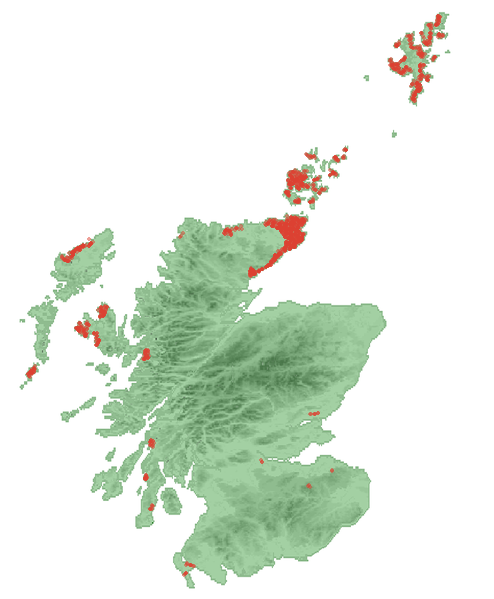
Overview of the distribution of "brochs", showing those in the Shetland isles

The same site provides dates for early Neolithic activity, and finds at Scourd of Brouster in Walls have been dated to 3400 BC. (Note: The Scord of Brouster site includes a cluster of six or seven walled fields and three stone circular houses that contains the earliest hoe-blades found so far in Scotland.) "Shetland knives" are stone tools that date from this period made from felsite from Northmavine.

Brochs were built in Shetland until 150-200 CE: in the case of Old Scatness in Shetland (near Jarlshof), brochs were sometimes located close to arable land and a source of water (some have wells or natural springs rising within their central space). Sometimes, on the other hand, they were sited in wilderness areas (e.g. Levenwick and Culswick in main Shetland). Brochs are often built beside the sea and sometimes they are on islands in lochs (e.g. Clickimin in Shetland).

The Romans were aware of (and probably circumnavigated, seeing in the distance Thule according to Tacitus) the Orkney & Shetland Islands, which they called "Orcades", where they discovered the brochs. A "king of the Orcades" was one of the 11 rulers said to have paid tribute to Claudius following his invasion of Britain in AD 43. Indeed some 4th and 5th century sources include these islands in a Roman province.

Archaeological evidence suggests that the Romans only traded with the inhabitants, perhaps through intermediaries, no signs of clear occupation have been found. But, according to scholars like Montesanti, "Orkney and Shetland might have been one of those areas that suggest direct administration by Imperial Roman procurators, at least for a very short span of time".

Evidence for the language spoken in Shetland immediately before Norse colonization (c. 650 to 800 CE) is limited. Katherine Forsyth (2020) suggests that such evidence, including the island name Yell and a number of names and words found on inscriptions such those at Lunnasting and St Ninian's Isle, indicates the presence of a Celtic language of the Brittonic branch.

== Viking expansion ==
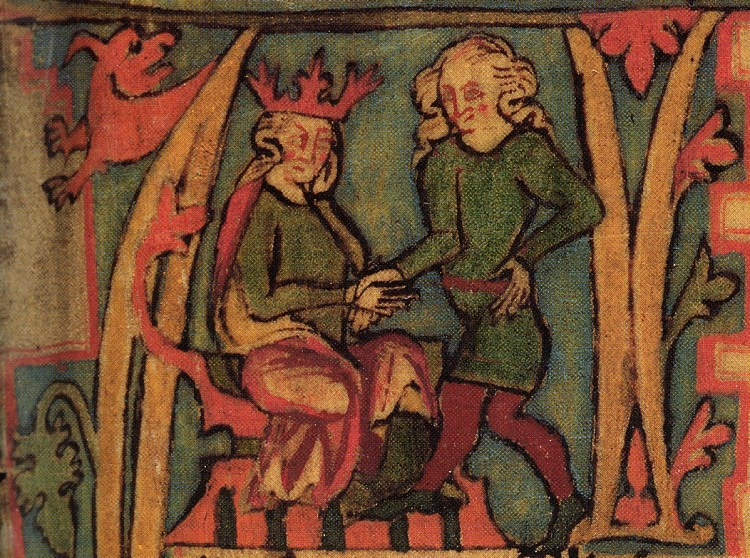
Harald Fairhair took control of Hjaltland in ca 875. The image is from the Icelandic manuscript Flateyjarbók from the 15th century.

By the end of the 9th century the Scandinavians shifted their attention from plundering to invasion, mainly due to the overpopulation of Scandinavia in comparison to resources and arable land available there.

Shetland was colonised by Norsemen in the 9th century, the fate of the existing indigenous population being uncertain. The colonists gave it that name and established their laws and language. That language evolved into the West Nordic language Norn, which survived into the 19th century.

After Harald Fairhair took control of all Norway, many of his opponents fled, some to Orkney and Shetland. From the Northern Isles they continued to raid Scotland and Norway, prompting Harald to raise a large fleet which he sailed to the islands. In about 875 he and his forces took control of Shetland and Orkney. Ragnvald, Earl of Møre received Orkney and Shetland as an earldom from the king as reparation for his son's being killed in battle in Scotland. Ragnvald gave the earldom to his brother Sigurd the Mighty.

Shetland was Christianised in the late tenth and eleventh centuries due to pressure from the Norwegian kings, especially Olaf Tryggvason.

== Conflict with Norway ==
In 1194 when king Sverre Sigurdsson (ca 1145–1202) ruled Norway and Harald Maddadsson was Earl of Orkney and Shetland, the Lendmann Hallkjell Jonsson and the Earl's brother-in-law Olav raised an army called the eyjarskeggjar on Orkney and sailed for Norway. Their pretender king was Olav's young foster son Sigurd, son of king Magnus Erlingsson. The eyjarskeggjar were beaten in the Battle of Florvåg near Bergen. The body of Sigurd Magnusson was displayed for the king in Bergen in order for him to be sure of the death of his enemy, but he also demanded that Harald Maddadsson (Harald jarl) answer for his part in the uprising. In 1195 the earl sailed to Norway to reconcile with King Sverre. As a punishment the king placed the earldom of Shetland under the direct rule of the king, from which it was probably never returned.

== Growing Scottish interest ==
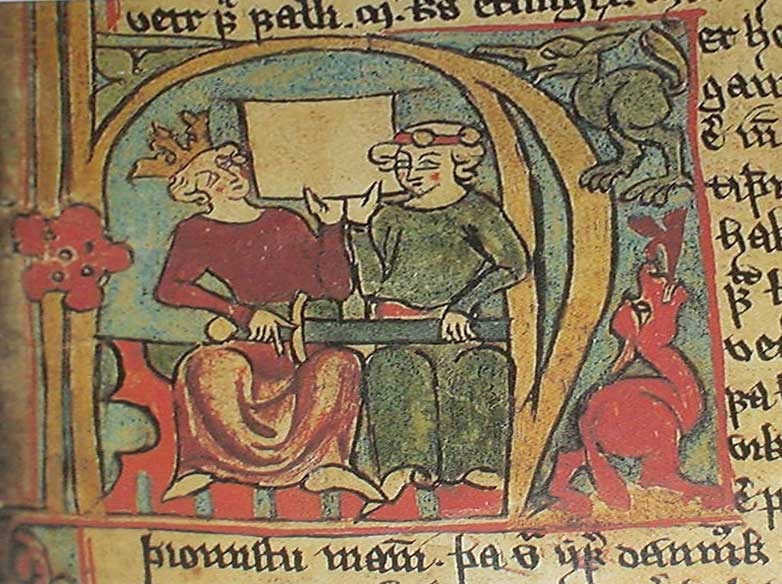
Håkon Håkonsson and Skule Bårdsson depicted in the Icelandic manuscript Flateyjarbók from the 14th century

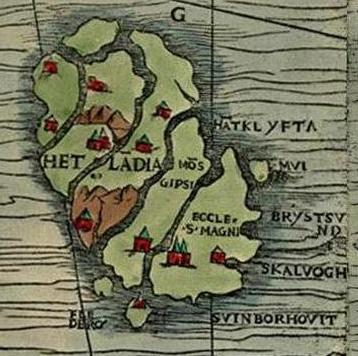
An inaccurate map of Shetland from the Carta Marina of 1529

When Alexander III of Scotland turned twenty-one in 1262 and became of age, he declared his intention of continuing the aggressive policy his father had begun towards the western and northern isles. This had been put on hold when his father had died thirteen years earlier. Alexander sent a formal demand to the Norwegian King Håkon Håkonsson.

After decades of civil war, Norway had achieved stability and grown to be a substantial nation with influence in Europe and the potential to be a powerful force in war. With this as a background, King Håkon rejected all demands from the Scots. The Norwegians regarded all the islands in the North Sea as part of the Norwegian realm. To add weight to his answer, King Håkon activated the leidang and set off from Norway in a fleet which is said to have been the largest ever assembled in Norway. The fleet met up in Breideyarsund in Shetland (probably today's Bressay Sound) before the king and his men sailed for Scotland and made landfall on Arran. The aim was to conduct negotiations with the army as a backup.

Alexander III drew out the negotiations while he patiently waited for the autumn storms to set in. Finally, after tiresome diplomatic talks, King Håkon lost his patience and decided to attack. At the same time a large storm set in which destroyed several of his ships and kept others from making landfall. The Battle of Largs in October 1263 was not decisive and both parties claimed victory, but King Håkon Håkonsson's position was hopeless. On 5 October, he returned to Orkney with a discontented army, and there he died of a fever on 17 December 1263. His death halted any further Norwegian expansion in Scotland.

King Magnus Lagabøte broke with his father's expansion policy and started negotiations with Alexander III. In the Treaty of Perth of 1266 he surrendered his furthest Norwegian possessions including Man and the Sudreyar (Hebrides) to Scotland in return for 4,000 marks sterling and an annuity of 100 marks. The Scots also recognised Norwegian sovereignty over Orkney and Shetland.

One of the main reasons behind the Norwegian desire for peace with Scotland was that trade with England was suffering from the constant state of war. In the new trade agreement between England and Norway in 1223 the English demanded Norway make peace with Scotland. In 1269, this agreement was expanded to include mutual free trade.

== Pawned to Scotland ==
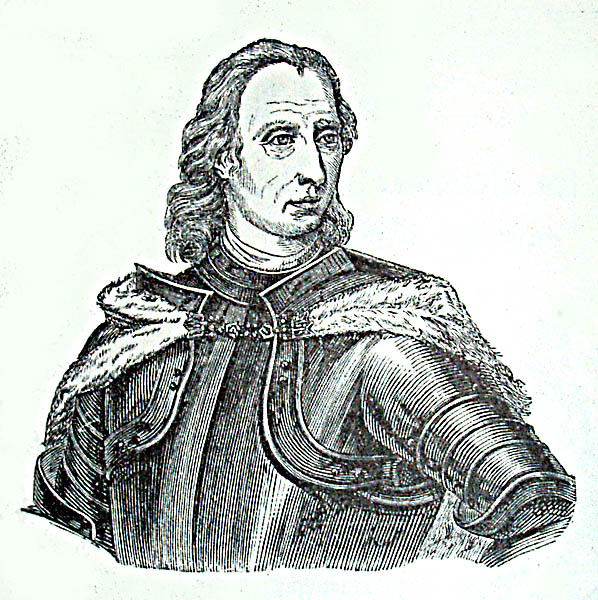
Illustration of King Christian I of Denmark from the Nordens Historie of 1887

In the 14th century Norway still treated Orkney and Shetland as a Norwegian province, but Scottish influence was growing, and in 1379 the Scottish earl Henry Sinclair took control of Orkney on behalf of the Norwegian king Håkon VI Magnusson. In 1384 Norway was severely weakened by the Black Plague and in 1397 it entered the Kalmar Union. With time Norway came increasingly under Danish control. King Christian I of Denmark and Norway was in financial trouble and, when his daughter Margaret became engaged to James III of Scotland in 1468, he needed money to pay her dowry. Under Norse udal law, the king had no overall ownership of the land in the realm as in the Scottish feudal system. He was king of his people, rather than king of the land. What the king did not personally own was owned absolutely by others. The King's lands represented only a small part of Shetland. Apparently without the knowledge of the Norwegian Riksråd (Council of the Realm) he entered into a commercial contract on 8 September 1468 with the King of Scots in which he pawned his personal interests in Orkney for 50,000 Rhenish guilders. On 28 May the next year he also pawned his Shetland interests for 8,000 Rhenish guilders. He secured a clause in the contract which gave Christian or his successors the right to redeem the islands for a fixed sum of 210 kilograms (460 lb) of gold or 2,310 kilograms (5,090 lb) of silver. There was an obligation to retain the language and laws of Norway, which was not only implicit in the pawning document, but is acknowledged in later correspondence between James III and King Christian's son John (Hans). In 1470 William Sinclair, 1st Earl of Caithness ceded his title to James III and on 20 February 1472, the Northern Isles were directly annexed to the Crown of Scotland.

James and his successors fended off all attempts by the Danes to redeem them (by formal letter or by special embassies were made in 1549, 1550, 1558, 1560, 1585, 1589, 1640, 1660 and other intermediate years) not by contesting the validity of the claim, but by simply avoiding the issue.

== Hansa era ==
From the early 15th century on the Shetlanders sold their goods through the Hanseatic League of German merchantmen. The Hansa would buy shiploads of salted fish, wool and butter and import salt, cloth, beer and other goods. The late 16th century and early 17th century was dominated by the influence of the despotic Robert Stewart, Earl of Orkney, who was granted the islands by his half-sister Mary Queen of Scots, and his son Patrick. The latter commenced the building of Scalloway Castle, but after his execution in 1609 the Crown annexed Orkney and Shetland again until 1643 when Charles I granted them to William Douglas, 7th Earl of Morton. These rights were held on and off by the Mortons until 1766, when they were sold by James Douglas, 14th Earl of Morton to Sir Laurence Dundas.

== British era ==
The trade with the North German towns lasted until the Act of Union 1707 prohibited the German merchants from trading with Shetland. Shetland then went into an economic depression as the Scottish and local traders were not as skilled in trading with salted fish. However, some local merchant-lairds took up where the German merchants had left off, and fitted out their own ships to export fish from Shetland to the Continent. For the independent farmers of Shetland this had negative consequences, as they now had to fish for these merchant-lairds. With the passing of the Crofters' Holdings (Scotland) Act 1886 the Liberal prime minister William Ewart Gladstone emancipated crofters from the rule of the landlords. The act enabled those who had effectively been landowners' serfs to become owner-occupiers of their own small farms.

During the 200 years after the pawning, the islands were passed back and forth fourteen times between the Crown and courtiers as a means of extracting income. Laws were changed, weights and measures altered and the language suppressed, a process historians now call "feudalisation" as a means by which Shetland became incorporated into Scotland, particularly during the 17th century. The term is a nonsense because a feudal charter requires ownership by the Crown – ownership it has never had and has never openly claimed to have had. As late as the 20th century the courts declared that no land in Shetland was under feudal tenure.

The Crown might have thought that by prescription (the passage of time) it gave them ownership necessary to give out feudal charters, grants, or licences. It certainly behaved that way. Nevertheless, this was proved wrong by the Treaty of Breda (1667). Its direct concern was the redistribution of colonial lands throughout the world after the second Anglo-Dutch war. It was signed by ‘the plenipotentiaries of Europe’ – delegations having full government power.

The Danish delegation tried to have a clause inserted to have the islands returned without delay. Because the overall treaty was too important to Charles II he eventually conceded that the original marriage document still stood, that his and previous monarchs' actions in granting out the islands under feudal charters were illegal.

In 1669 Charles II passed the Orkney and Shetland Act 1669 (c. 19), restoring the situation much as it had been in 1469. He abolished the office of sheriff and "erected Shetland into a Stewartry", having "a direct dependence upon His Majesty and his officers" (what today we would today call a Crown Dependency) (Note: The Isle of Man is a Crown Dependency. It is one of Her Majesty’s personal dominions, not subject to acts of the UK Parliament. In Shetland because it is only in the position of having trusteeship, the Crown has an even weaker hold than it has in the Isle of Man, so a new description would have to be invented.). Charles II also provided that, in the event of a "general dissolution of his majesty's properties" by which he clearly meant the Act of Union, Shetland was not to be included. Shetland could not be incorporated into the realm of Scotland or the proposed new union with England. The terms of the marriage document also meant that any acts of Parliament before or after the pawning could have had no relevance to Shetland.

With the consent of Parliament, Charles was taking the exclusive rights to the islands back to the Crown for all time coming. Furthermore, he was specifically excluding Shetland from the coming Act of Union, even going so far as to say that the Act of Union itself would be null and void if Shetland were to be included.

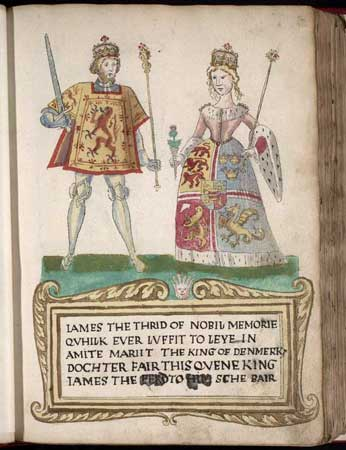

Several attempts were made during the 17th and 18th centuries to redeem the islands, without success. Following a legal dispute with William, Earl of Morton, who held the estates of Orkney and Shetland, Charles II ratified the pawning document by a Scottish act of Parliament, the Orkney and Shetland Act 1669 (c. 19), on 27 December 1669 which officially made the islands a Crown dependency and exempt from any "dissolution of His Majesty’s lands". In 1742 a further act of Parliament, the Orkney and Shetland Act 1741 (15 Geo. 2. c. 4 Pr.), returned the estates to a later Earl of Morton, although the original 1669 act of Parliament specifically ruled that any future act regarding the islands status would be "considered null, void and of no effect".

Nonetheless, Shetland's connection with Norway has proven to be enduring. When the union between Norway and Sweden ended in 1906 the Shetland authorities sent a letter to King Haakon VII in which they stated: "Today no 'foreign' flag is more familiar or more welcome in our voes and havens than that of Norway, and Shetlanders continue to look upon Norway as their mother-land, and recall with pride and affection the time when their forefathers were under the rule of the Kings of Norway."

== Napoleonic Wars ==
Some 3,000 Shetlanders served in the Royal Navy during the Napoleonic Wars from 1800 to 1815.

== World War II ==
During World War II a Norwegian naval unit nicknamed the "Shetland Bus" was established by the Special Operations Executive Norwegian Section in the autumn of 1940 with a base first at Lunna and later in Scalloway in order to conduct operations on the coast of Norway. About 30 fishing vessels used by Norwegian refugees were gathered in Shetland. Many of these vessels were rented, and Norwegian fishermen were recruited as volunteers to operate them.

The Shetland Bus sailed in covert operations between Norway and Shetland, carrying men from Company Linge, intelligence agents, refugees, instructors for the resistance, and military supplies. Many people on the run from the Germans, and much important information on German activity in Norway, were brought back to the Allies this way. Some mines were laid and direct action against German ships was also taken. At the start the unit was under a British command, but later Norwegians joined in the command.

The fishing vessels made 80 trips across the sea. German attacks and bad weather caused the loss of 10 boats, 44 crewmen, and 60 refugees. Because of the high losses it was decided to procure faster vessels. The Americans gave the unit the use of three submarine chasers (HNoMS Hessa, HNoMS Hitra and HNoMS Vigra). None of the trips with these vessels incurred loss of life or equipment.

The Shetland Bus made over 200 trips across the sea and the most famous of the men, Leif Andreas Larsen (Shetlands-Larsen) made 52 of them.

== Cultural influences ==
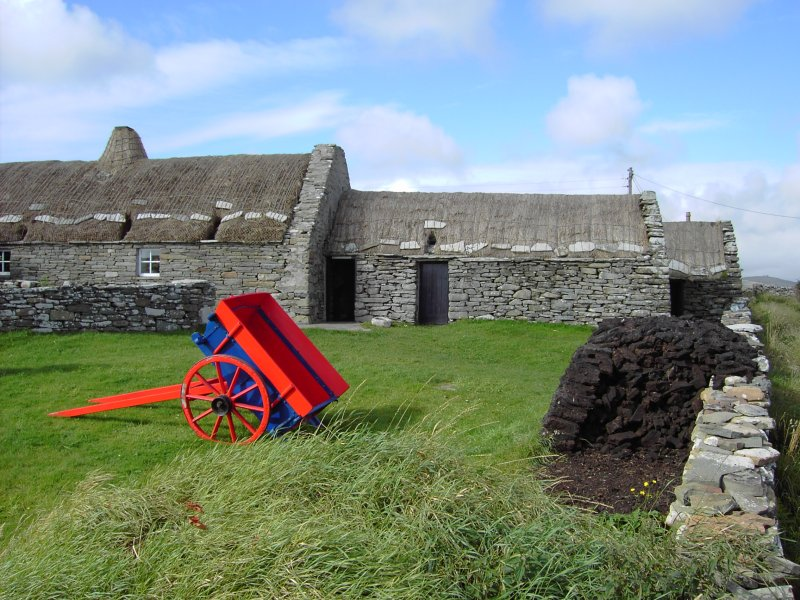
The Shetland Crofthouse museum

Historical, archaeological, place-name and linguistic evidence indicates Norse cultural dominance of Shetland during the Viking period. A few place names might have Pictish origin, but this is disputed. Several genetic studies have been conducted investigating the genetic makeup of the islands' population today in order to establish its origin. Shetlanders are less than half Scandinavian in origin. They have almost identical proportions of Scandinavian matrilineal and patrilineal ancestry (ca 44%), suggesting that the islands were settled by both men and women, as seems to have been the case in Orkney and the northern and western coastline of Scotland, but areas of the British Isles further away from Scandinavia show signs of being colonised primarily by males who found local wives. After the islands were transferred to Scotland thousands of Scots families emigrated to Shetland in the 16th and 17th centuries. Contacts with Germany and the Netherlands through the fishing trade brought smaller numbers of immigrants from those countries. World War II and the oil industry have also brought about population growth through immigration.

== Population development ==
The population development in Shetland has through history been affected by deaths at sea and epidemics. Smallpox afflicted the islands in the 17th and 18th centuries, but as inoculations pioneered by those such as Johnnie Notions came into widespread use the population was able to grow more quickly. By 1861 the population increased to 40,000. The population increase led to a lack of food, and many young men went away to serve in the British merchant fleet. By 100 years later the islands' population had been more than halved, mainly due to many Shetland men being lost at sea during the two world wars, and the waves of emigration in the 1920s and 1930s. Now more people of Shetland background live in Canada, Australia and New Zealand than in Shetland.

District	Population					
District	1961	1971	1981	1991	2001	2011
Bound Skerry (& Grunay)	3	3	0	0	0	0
Bressay	269	248	334	352	384	368
Bruray	34	35	33	27	26	24
East Burra	92	64	78	72	66	76
Fair Isle	64	65	58	67	69	68
Fetlar	127	88	101	90	86	61
Foula	54	33	39	40	31	38
Housay	71	63	49	58	50	50
Mainland	13,282	12,944	17,722	17,562	17,550	18,765
Muckle Flugga	3	3	0	0	0	0
Muckle Roe	103	94	99	115	104	130
Isle of Noss	0	3	0	0	0	0
Papa Stour	55	24	33	33	25	15
Trondra	20	17	93	117	133	135
Unst	1,148	1,124	1,140	1,055	720	632
Vaila	9	5	0	7	2	2
West Burra	561	501	767	817	753	776
Whalsay	764	870	1,031	1,041	1,589	1,061
Yell	1,155	1,143	1,191	1,075	957	966
Total	17,814	17,327	22,768	22,522	22,990	23,167

=== Timeline ===
Year	Event
before 4320 BCE	The first, Mesolithic people arrive in Shetland.
84	The Roman fleet under Agricola sees Thule, which was possibly Shetland.
c. 650	Norse settlers began to settle in Shetland.
875	Harald Fairhair took control of the islands
1195	Harald Maddadsson lost the earldom of Shetland and the islands are put directly under the Norwegian king Sverre Sigurdsson
1379	The Scottish earl Henry Sinclair took control of Orkney on behalf of the Norwegian king Håkon VI Magnusson
1469	Christian I pawned Shetland to the Scottish king James III for a dowry
1472	Shetland officially annexed into the Kingdom of Scotland
1674	Battle of Ronas Voe
1700–1760	Smallpox hit the islands
18th century	Norn language gradually dies out
1707	The German merchants lost their trading rights in Shetland
1708	Capital moved from Scalloway to Lerwick
1880s	William Ewart Gladstone freed the serfs
1940	Shetland bus established by the Special Operations Executive
1972	Shetland marks 500 years of incorporation into Scotland
1975	Lerwick Town Council and Zetland County Council merged to Shetland Islands Council
1978	Oil terminal in Sullom Voe opened
