= USS SC-500 =

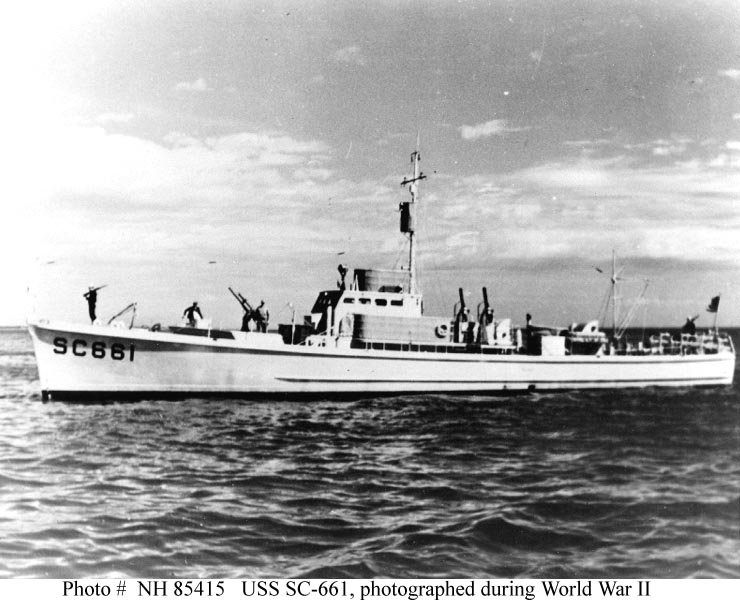
- USS SC-661, a fellow SC-497 class submarine chaser.

History

United States
- Name: USS SC-500
- Operator: United States Navy
- Builder: Fisher Boat Works, Detroit, Michigan
- Laid down: 27 February 1942
- Launched: 11 October 1942
- Commissioned: 31 March 1942
- Decommissioned: 10 June 1945
- Fate: Transferred to Soviet Navy, 10 June 1945

Soviet Union
- Name: BO-319
- Operator: Soviet Navy
- Acquired: 10 June 1945
- Commissioned: 10 June 1945
- Fate: Destroyed 1956 in lieu of return to United States

General characteristics
- Class & type: SC-497 class submarine chaser
- Type: submarine chaser
- Displacement: 148 tons
- Length: 110 ft 10 in (34 m)
- Beam: 17 ft (5 m)
- Draft: 6 ft 6 in (2 m)
- Propulsion: 2 × 880bhp General Motors 8-268A diesel engines, Snow and Knobstedt single reduction gear; 2 × shafts
- Speed: 15.6 knots
- Complement: 28
- Armament: 1 × 40 mm gun mount; 2 × .50 cal (12.7 mm) machine guns; 2 × Y-guns; 2 × depth charge tracks

USS SC-500 was a United States Navy SC-497-class submarine chaser in commission from 1942 to 1945 during World War II. She later served in the Soviet Navy as BO-319.

== Construction and commissioning ==
SC-500 was laid down on 27 February 1942 by the Fisher Boat Works in Detroit, Michigan, and launched on 11 October 1942. She was commissioned on 31 March 1942.

== Service history ==
After World War II service in the U.S. Navy, SC-500 was selected for transfer to the Soviet Navy in Project Hula – a secret program for the transfer of U.S. Navy ships to the Soviet Navy at Cold Bay, Territory of Alaska, in anticipation of the Soviet Union joining the war against Japan. Following the completion of training for her Soviet crew, SC-500 was decommissioned on 9 June 1945 and transferred to the Soviet Union under Lend-Lease immediately. Also commissioned into the Soviet Navy immediately, she was designated as a bolshiye okhotniki za povodnimi lodkami ("large submarine hunter") and renamed BO-319 in Soviet service. She soon departed Cold Bay and, after a stop at Adak to refuel and reprovision, proceeded to Petropavlovsk-Kamchatsky in the Soviet Union, where she served as a patrol vessel in the Soviet Far East.

== Disposal ==
In February 1946, the United States began negotiations for the return of ships loaned to the Soviet Union for use during World War II, and on 8 May 1947, United States Secretary of the Navy James V. Forrestal informed the United States Department of State that the United States Department of the Navy wanted 480 of the 585 combatant ships it had transferred to the Soviet Union for World War II use returned. Deteriorating relations between the two countries as the Cold War broke out led to protracted negotiations over the ships, and by the mid-1950s the U.S. Navy found it too expensive to bring home ships that had become worthless to it anyway. Many ex-American ships were merely administratively "returned" to the United States and instead sold for scrap in the Soviet Union, while others, at the suggestion of the Soviets, were destroyed off the Soviet coast under the observation of American naval authorities. In 1956, BO-319 was destroyed, probably off Nakhodka, under the latter arrangement.

== See also ==
- Other ships built by Fisher Boat Works:

- MV Cape Pine
- HNoMS Hitra
- USS SC-499
