= USS SC-499 =

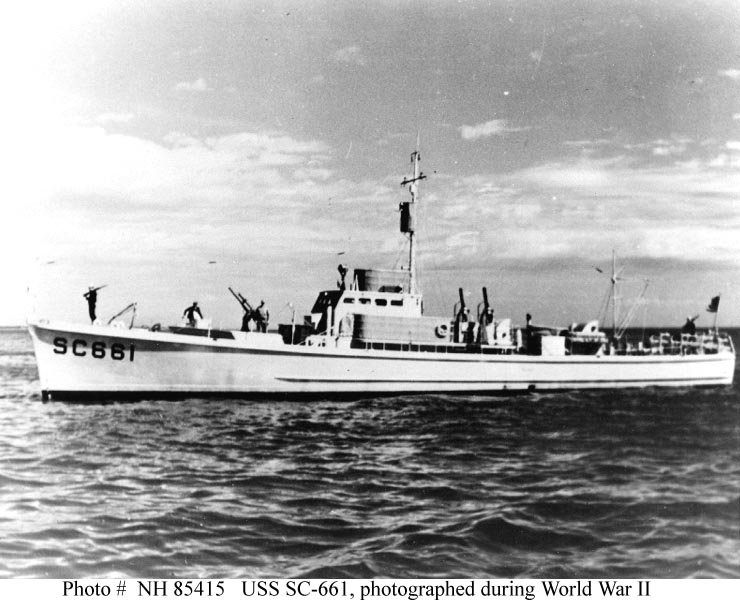
- USS SC-661, a fellow SC-497 class submarine chaser.

History

United States
- Name: USS SC-499
- Operator: United States Navy; United States Coast Guard
- Builder: Fisher Boat Works
- Laid down: 24 February 1941
- Launched: 24 March 1941
- Commissioned: 18 March 1942
- Recommissioned: 20 August 1945 as USCGC Air Brant (WAVR-412)
- Fate: Sold 20 January 1948

General characteristics
- Class & type: SC-497 class submarine chaser
- Type: submarine chaser
- Displacement: 148 tons
- Length: 110 ft 10 in (34 m)
- Beam: 17 ft (5 m)
- Draft: 6 ft 6 in (2 m)
- Propulsion: 2 × 1,540bhp General Motors (Electro-Motive Div.) 16-184A diesel engines; 2 × shafts
- Speed: 21 knots
- Complement: 28
- Armament: 1 × 40 mm gun; 2 × .50 cal (12.7 mm) caliber machine guns (2x1); 2 × Y-guns; 2 × ducts

USS SC-499 was a SC-497 class submarine chaser of wood construction that served in the United States Navy and later the United States Coast Guard during World War II. She was laid down as SC-499 on 24 February 1941 by the Fisher Boat Works in Detroit, Michigan, and launched on 24 October 1941. She was commissioned as USS SC-499 on 18 March 1942. SC-499 was transferred to the Coast Guard on 20 August 1945 and commissioned as USCGC Air Brant (WAVR-412). She was stationed at Staten Island, New York and assigned to the USCG Air Sea Rescue Service. On 23 January 1946 she was placed "in commission in reserve" and was sold on 20 January 1948.

== See also ==
- Other ships built by Fisher Boat Works:

- MV Cape Pine
- HNoMS Hitra
- USS SC-500
