= MV Cape Pine =

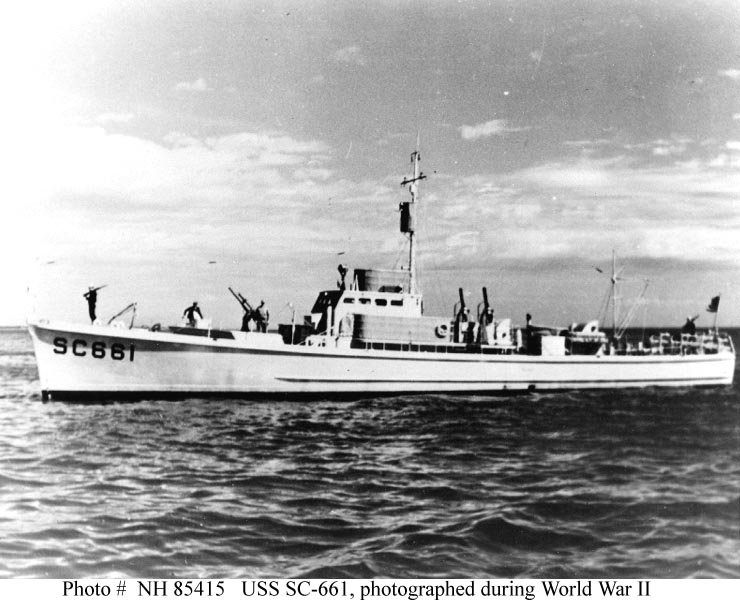
- A SC-497-class submarine chaser of the same type as USS SC-715

History

United States
- Name: USS SC-715
- Builder: Fisher Boat Works, Detroit, Michigan
- Laid down: 14 May 1942
- Launched: 23 October 1942
- Commissioned: 4 December 1942
- Recommissioned: Transferred to U.S. Coast Guard on 9 January 1946 and recommissioned as USCGC Air Killdeer (WAVR-433)

United States
- Name: USCGC Air Killdeer (WAVR 433)
- In service: 9 January 1946
- Out of service: Sold into mercantile service on 19 January 1948
- Renamed: Cape Pine on 14 May 1951
- Identification: IMO number: 5061750
- Status: In private service

General characteristics
- Class & type: SC-497-class submarine chaser
- Displacement: 95 tons
- Length: 110 ft 10 in (33.78 m)
- Beam: 17 ft (5.2 m)
- Draught: 6 ft 6 in (1.98 m)
- Propulsion: Two 1,540hp General Motors (Electro-Motive Div.) 16-184A diesel engines; Two shafts; As Cape Pine: one 320bhp diesel engine and one shaft
- Speed: 21 kts; 8 kts as Cape Pine
- Complement: 28
- Armament: 1 × single Bofors 40 mm L/60 gun mount forward; 1/2 x twin .50 cal (12.7 mm) machine guns; 1/2 x dcp "K Guns"; 14 depth charges with six single release chocks; two sets Mk 20 Mousetrap rails with four 7.2 projectiles

MV Cape Pine is a charter boat operated by the Maritime Heritage Society of Vancouver. She began life as USS SC-715, a SC-497-class submarine chaser of the United States Navy. She was later transferred to the United States Coast Guard and served under the name USCGC Air Killdeer (WAVR 433). Finally sold into mercantile service, as the Cape Pine, she worked as a high-endurance fish packer in the fisheries of the Canadian coast, and was then sold to the Maritime Heritage Society of Vancouver.

== Service history ==
=== Construction ===
SC-715 was laid down at the Fisher Boat Works in Detroit, Michigan on 14 May 1942, launched on 23 October 1942 and commissioned into the U.S. Navy on 4 December 1942.

=== U.S. Navy service during World War II ===
SC-715 served in the Atlantic and Pacific during World War II. After the war she was decommissioned at Seattle.

=== Post-war U.S. Coast Guard service ===
Transferred to the United States Coast Guard on 9 January 1946, SC-715 was renamed USCGC Air Killdeer. In this capacity she was used in offshore rescue duties. She was one of 70 such vessels transferred to the Coast Guard to cope with the problem of large numbers of aviation accidents as troops and personnel were returned to the United States after the war, in Operation Magic Carpet. The shortage of experienced pilots as enlisted men were discharged caused the number of accidents to rise. Manpower shortages also affected the Coast Guard, which at times struggled to crew the rescue vessels. After two years Air Killdeer was sold to a Canadian fishing company in British Columbia, on 19 January 1948.

==== Fish factory boat ====
She was registered as Cape Pine on 14 May 1951. Her new owners re-powered and modified the former submarine chaser to convert her to a high-endurance fish packer in support of the salmon and herring fisheries on the west coast of Canada.

==== Charter boat ====
Cape Pine is still afloat, having been sold to the Maritime Heritage Society in Vancouver, and is in operation as a private pleasure boat and charter boat out of Pender Harbour, British Columbia, Canada.

== See also ==
- Other ships built by Fisher Boat Works:

- HNoMS Hitra
- USS SC-499
- USS SC-500
