= Fisher Boatworks =

Marine service provider and shipbuilder in Detroit, Michigan

Coordinates: 42.358000°N 82.981917°W

Fisher Boatworks Company
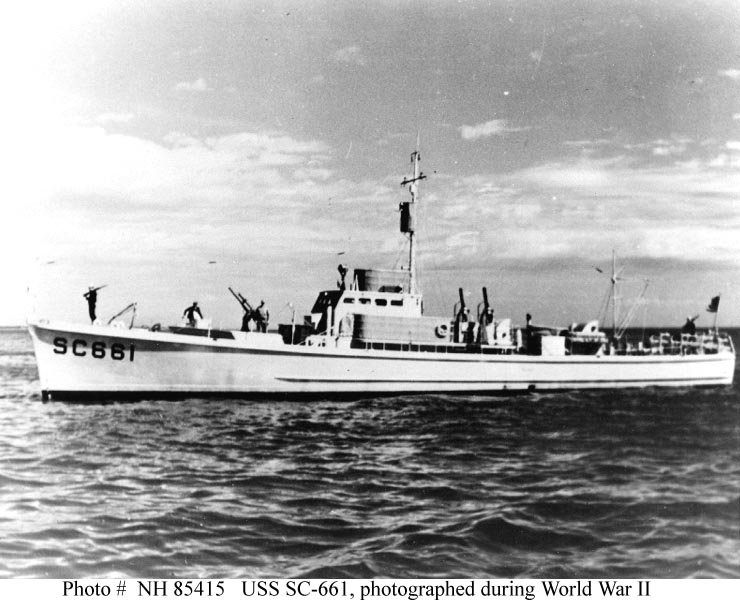
- Industry: Shipbuilding; Marine repair
- Founded: January 1937; 88 years ago
- Headquarters: 100 Motor Boat Lane, Detroit Michigan, USA
- Area served: US Navy and Detroit
- Products: PT Boats, Submarine chaser
- Services: Boat building and repair

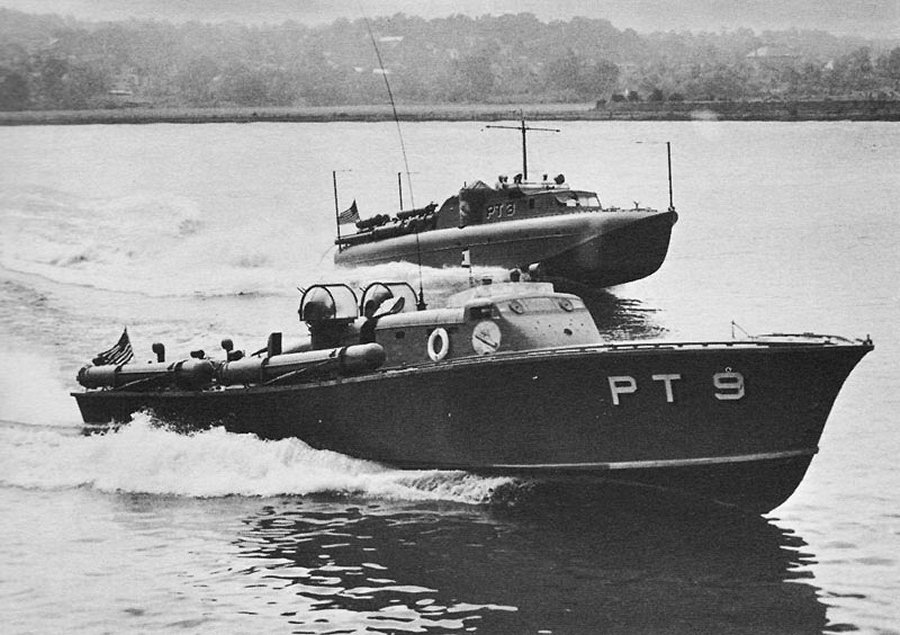
PT-3 in July 1940 back boat built by Fisher Boatworks, (PT-9 in front)

Fisher Boatworks was boatyard in Detroit, Michigan founded in 1937 by William P. Fisher. The Fisher Boatworks site was first the Russell J. Pouliot Boat Works founded in the 1930s. Fisher Boatworks built many Submarine chaser boats for World War II. They are also known for building one of first Prototype PT boats: PT-3 and PT-3. Fisher Boatworks closed after the war in 1945. The boatyard was on Motor Boat Lane, now the Gregory Marina on the Detroit River of the Waterworks Park.

== PT boats ==
PT-3 and PT-4 were built by Fisher Boatworks 1940 The to boats were 59-foot US Navy prototype Torpedo Boat. They had a displacement 25 tons and top speed of 30 kts. Two 1,350 hp Packard gasoline engines with two shafts. Had a beam of 18 feet. George Crouch designed PT-1 and PT-2 in 1939.

- PT-3 Laid down 1 August 1939, launched 18 April 1940, and completed 20 June 1940
- PT-4 Laid down 5 August 1939, launched 19 April 1940, and completed 20 June 1940

The PT-3 and PT-3 design was not used in the final production of PT boats, as long and larger boat designs were used, 70-foot, 78-foot and 80-foot.

== Boats ==
  - PT Boats:
- PT-3 Placed in service 24 July 1940 and assigned to Motor Torpedo Boat Squadron ONE (MTBRon 1) for evaluations. MTBRon 1, was under the command of Lt. Earl S. Caldwell. MTBRon 1 was the first PT squadron commissioned and originally was made up of experimental boats PT-3 was transferred 19 April 1942 to the Royal Navy and reclassified HM MTB-273, but the transfer to the Royal Navy was canceled, transferred to the Royal Canadian Air Force and named Bras D'Or (M-413) for use as a High Speed Rescue Boat, reclassified B-119. Returned to U.S. Navy 10 April 1945. Transferred to the War Shipping Administration 2 May 1946, and sold. In 2012 was at Flanigan Brothers Boatyard, in Fairton, New Jersey, for restoration.
- PT-4 Placed in service and assigned to Motor Torpedo Boat Squadron ONE (MTBRon 1). Given nickname The "Old Faithful, and also Get In Step. She was transferred to the Royal Navy 11 March 1941 and reclassified HM MTB-274. But transfer to the Royal Navy canceled 19 April 1941. Transferred instead to the Royal Canadian Air Force and named RCAF Osoyoos (M 414) and used as a High Speed Rescue Boat, reclassified B-120. Returned to U.S. Navy custody on 14 June 1945, transferred to the War Shipping Administration in October 1946, fate unknown, may have been scrapped.

  - Submarine chasers, 136 tons, 110-feet
- SC-453 to SC 721
- SC 1347 to SC 1350 US Navy built from 1940 to 1943.
  - Some Submarine chaser boats:
- MV Cape Pine
- HNoMS Hitra
- USS SC-499
- USS SC-500
- SC-715 is owned by Ronan Oger in Garden Bay, British Columbia Canada.
- SC-1349 was scuttled off of Guam 20 June 1946
- Under Lend-Lease six of the Submarine chaser were sent to the Soviet Union.
- After the war 8 of the Submarine chaser boats became United States Coast Guard patrol boats.
