= HNoMS Vigra =

Royal Norwegian Navy submarine chaser in WW2

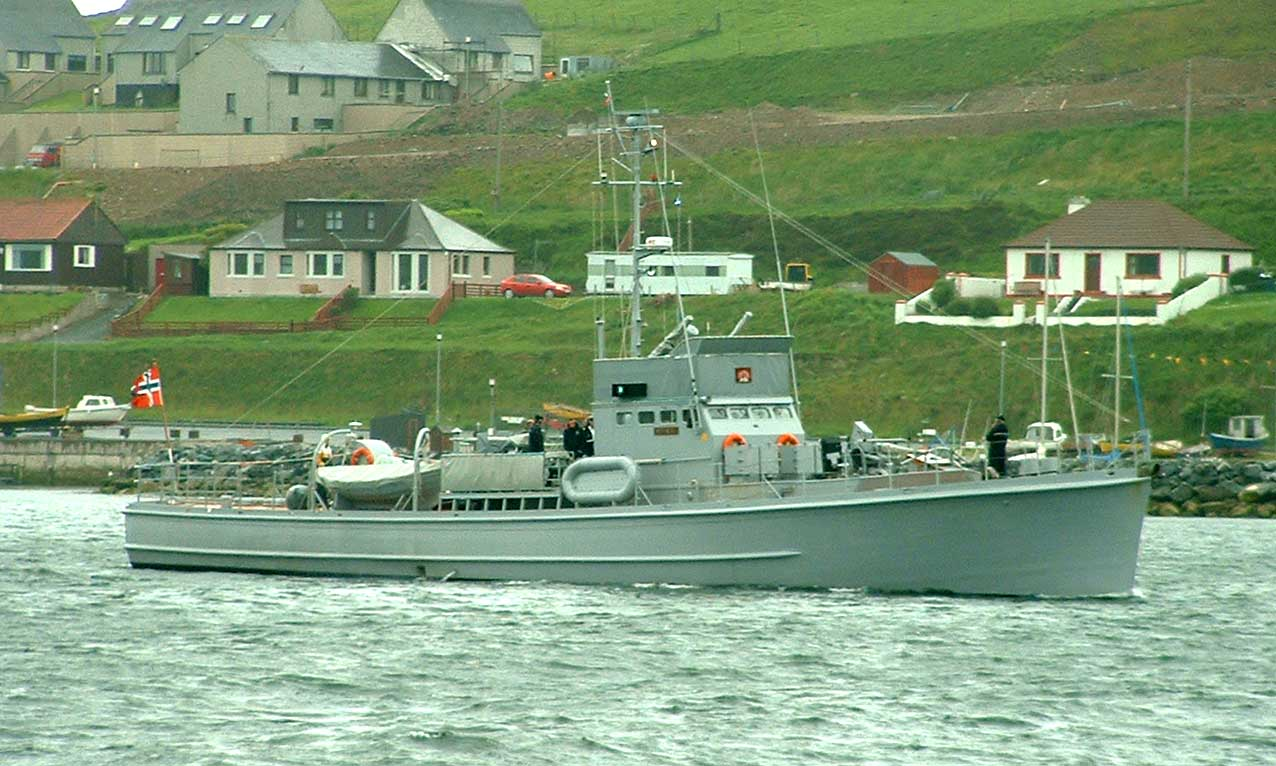
- Sister ship HNoMS Hitra entering Scalloway harbour, June 2003

History

United States
- Name: SC-1061
- Builder: Harris and Parsons Inc. of East Greenwich, RI
- Laid down: 23 May 1942
- Launched: 26 September 1942
- Commissioned: 5 January 1943
- Fate: Transferred to Royal Norwegian Navy, 12 October 1943

History

Norway
- Name: Vigra
- Namesake: Island of Vigra
- Commissioned: 26 October 1943
- Fate: Sank

General characteristics
- Displacement: 125 tons
- Length: 110.6 ft (33.71 m)
- Beam: 18.8 ft (5.73 m)
- Draft: 6 ft (1.83 m)
- Propulsion: Two General Motors diesel engines with 1,200 hp, two shafts
- Speed: 20 knots (37.04 km/h)
- Range: 2,500 nautical miles (4,630.00 km) at 10 knots (18.52 km/h)
- Complement: 24 men
- Armament: 1 × Bofors 40 mm L/60 gun; 1 × 2 pounder pom-pom; 2 × Oerlikon 20 mm cannon; 2 × 12.7 mm Colt; anti-aircraft machineguns
- Notes: All the above listed information, unless otherwise noted, was acquired from Abelsen 1986, p. 278

The HNoMS Vigra was a Royal Norwegian Navy submarine chaser that saw action during World War II. She was named after the Norwegian island of Vigra.

== History ==
=== Wartime service ===
The Vigra was originally built as a SC-497 class submarine chaser for the United States Navy. She was laid down on 23 May 1942 by Harris and Parsons Inc. of East Greenwich, RI and launched on 26 September 1942. She was commissioned into the US Navy as USS SC-1061 on 5 January 1943.

In August 1943 US Admiral Harold R. Stark, commander of US Naval Forces Europe, ordered SC-1061 and two other SC-class subchasers - SC-683 and SC-718 - to be transferred to Britain. Stationed in Miami at the time, the three subchasers received top secret orders to report to Brooklyn Navy Yard where they were to await further orders. When they arrived at the Naval Yard, the vessels' commanders were ordered to warn their crews to observe strict silence about their movements and were told that the three ships had been picked for a "special purpose".

The three subchasers were hoisted aboard three Liberty Ships and secured as deck cargo and preparations made to transport them and their crews to an undisclosed location. It was only when the ships were under way that the crews were told that they were bound for Belfast.

The ships arrived in Belfast in early October 1943, where the three subchasers were lifted back into the water, and on 14 October the three ships sailed up the Firth of Clyde to the US Naval base known as Rosneath naval base, where a group of exiled Norwegian sailors of the Shetland Bus organisation were awaiting the vessels' arrival. It was not until the three ships moored that their US crews finally learned that the purpose of their journey was to train the Norwegians in the operation of the subchasers' equipment, and that upon completion of the training they were to hand their ships over to Norwegian command. The training lasted just a week, then the transfer of command was completed.

After assuming command at Rosneath, the Norwegian crews sailed their new vessels first to Derry, and then to Scalloway in Shetland, where they completed their fitting-out. The subchasers' depth charge racks, Mousetrap anti-submarine rocket launchers, and K-gun depth charge projectors were removed, and an additional set of davits were installed so that each ship could carry two boats, whose motors were equipped with specially muffled exhausts for ultra-quiet running. They also removed one of the Oerlikon 20 mm cannon from amidships and installed a 2-pounder gun aft and two cal .50 machine guns on the flying bridge. The ships were christened Hitra (SC-718), Hessa (SC-683), and Vigra (SC-1061).

The Vigra and her sister vessels superseded the famous fleet of civilian fishing boats that had formerly run naval operations between Shetland and Norway. During the final two years of World War II the three ships performed a total of 114 missions to occupied Norway, and apart from one incident when a Canadian aircraft fired on Hessa, the voyages were uneventful and there were no casualties.

Late in the war an observer from Admiral Stark's office wrote:

It would be difficult to sum up the value of these three craft in their contribution to the [Allies]. Hundreds of tons of stores and supplies have been delivered to Resistance groups. An enemy plane has been shot down. Countless agents have been taken in and out and great numbers of marooned allied airmen, including Americans, have been helped to evade the Gestapo. Despite very heavy weather the ships have required minimum repairs.

=== Postwar ===
After the war the Vigra performed coast guard duties until 1953. All three submarine chasers were mothballed at Marvika and formally decommissioned in 1959.The Vigra was first sold to Sea Scouts for 1 NOK and finally sank near Malmö where she was used as a sand barge.

The name HNoMS Vigra is today held by a smaller patrol vessel used by the Norwegian Naval Academy for Officer cadet training (P359)
