= Ingvald Eidsheim =

- Born: 27 November 1909; Hosanger, Norway
- Died: 23 February 2000 (aged 90)
- Military career
- Allegiance: Norway
- Rank: Kommandørkaptein (Commander (N))
- Unit: Shetland Bus
- Commands: HNoMS Hitra; HNoMY Norge

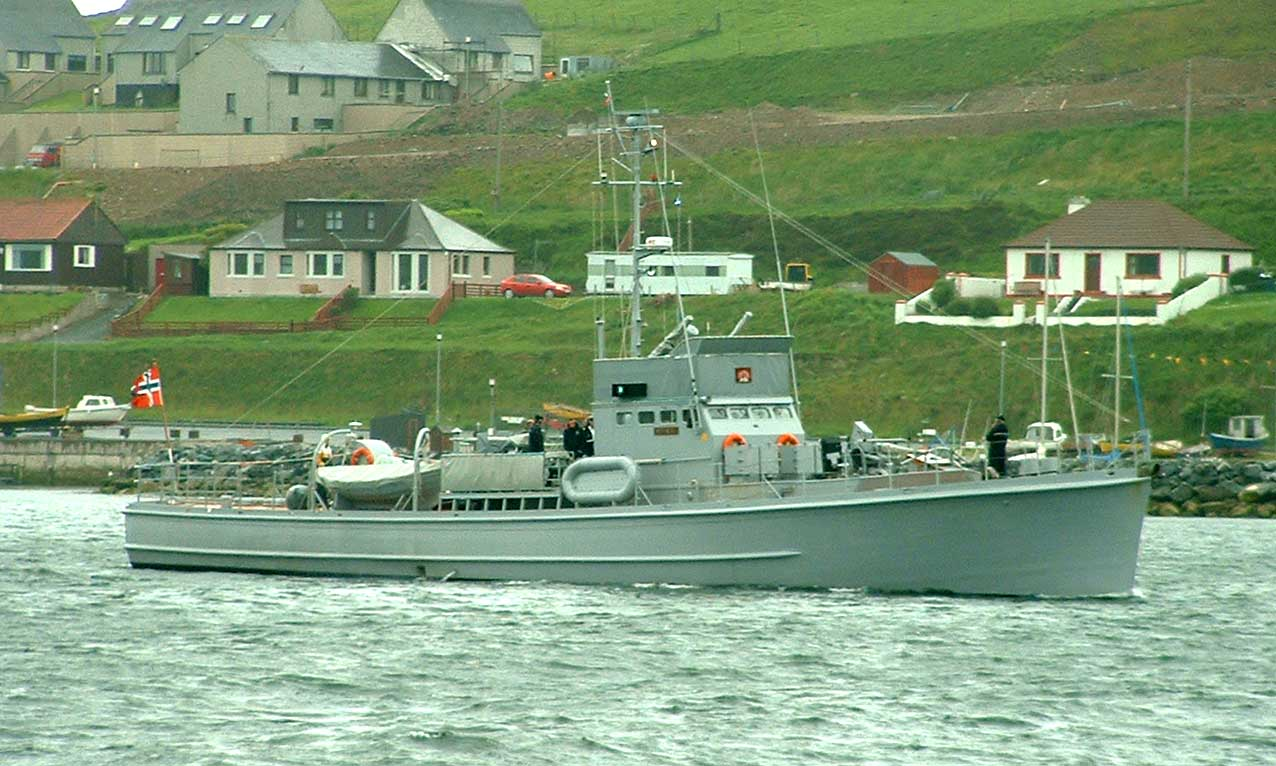
HNoMS Hitra, Eidsheims old ship, in Scalloway, Shetland June 2003

Ingvald Olsen Eidsheim (born 27 November 1909 in Hosanger Municipality, died 23 February 2000) was a Norwegian sailor and war hero. He joined the Shetland bus as the commander of Hitra. He conducted 43 trips to Norway.

After the war he worked as a civilian until he rejoined the Royal Norwegian Navy in 1948 and amongst other assignments commanded the Norwegian Royal Yacht Norge.

From 1950 he served on the Central Defence Command Staff and eventually headed the Norwegian Home Guard staff. Following his retirement he committed himself to the restoration of his old ship Hitra.

== Honours and awards ==
For his war efforts he received the highest Norwegian decoration, the War Cross with Sword, the British Distinguished Service Order and Distinguished Service Cross, and the American Medal of Freedom.

On 25 August 2007 Eidsheim was honoured with a monument on the pier of Eknesvågen in Lindås Municipality (now part of Alver Municipality). The monument was made by sculptor Arne Mæland and dedicated by Minister of Defence Anne-Grete Strøm-Erichsen.

War Cross with Sword
Defence Medal 1940–1945	Distinguished Service Order	Distinguished Service Cross	Medal of Freedom
