= Orkney and Shetland Act 1669 =

Scottish act of Parliament

- Act of Parliament
- Parliament of Scotland
- Long title: Act for Annexation of Orkney and Zetland to the Crown.
- Citation: 1669 c. 19 [12mo ed: c. 13]
- Territorial extent: Scotland

Dates
- Royal assent: 27 December 1669

The Orkney and Shetland Act 1669 (c. 19) was an act of the Parliament of Scotland to establish Orkney and Shetland's status as Crown Dependencies following a legal dispute with William Douglas, 9th Earl of Morton, who held the estates of Orkney and Shetland.

Titled "Act for Annexation of Orknay and Zetland to the Crown", the legislation was passed on 27 December 1669 (17 December old style) and was the last law passed by the Parliament before its adjournment six days later.

Orkney and Shetland Act 1741
- Act of Parliament
- Parliament of Great Britain
- Long title: An Act for dissolving and disannexing from the Crown, and the Patrimony thereof, the Earldom of Orkney and Lordship of Zetland; and for vesting the same irredeemably in James Earl of Morton and his Heirs, discharged from any Power or Right of Redemption in His Majesty, His Heirs or Successors.
- Citation: 15 Geo. 2. c. 4 Pr.
- Territorial extent: Great Britain

Dates
- Royal assent: 16 March 1742
- Commencement: 1 December 1741 (Note: Start of session.)

Status: Current legislation

The act made Orkney and Shetland exempt from any "dissolution of His Majesty's lands". In 1742 a further act of Parliament, the Orkney and Shetland Act 1741 (15 Geo. 2. c. 4 Pr.), returned the estates to a later Earl of Morton, James Douglas, 14th Earl of Morton, despite the original act of Parliament specifically stating that any such change was to be "considered null, void and of no effect".

The 1669 act specifically removed Orkney and Shetland from the jurisdiction of the Scottish Parliament and places it firmly in the care of the Crown, restoring the situation as it was 200 years prior at the time of the pawning of the islands by King Christian I of Denmark/Norway to Scotland's James III.

== See also ==
- Orkney § Absorption by Scotland
- Shetland § Absorption by Scotland
