= Rosneath naval base =

Former UK naval base

Base II, Rosneath
- Rosneath Bay; Near Rosneath in Scotland

Site information
- Owner: Royal Navy

Location
- Coordinates: 56.008301°N 4.7973°W

Site history
- Built: 1941
- Built by: Royal Engineers; 29th Seabees; 79th Seabees
- In use: 1948
- Fate: Decommissioned 1948

Rosneath naval base (HMS Rosneath) was a naval base, constructed on the Rosneath peninsula, Argyll and Bute, Scotland. close to the village of Rosneath. The construction of the base started in July 1941, in response to American expectations that they would be shortly entering World War II. In June 1945, the base was decommissioned, then fell into disuse and was finally closed in 1948. Sometime after 1948, the base was demolished and was replaced by new housing, a school and a church. Little remains of the base.

== Rosneath castle ==
Rosneath Castle was situated at the head of the bay, and used as transient officers' accommodation and as an officers' mess. The castle had been rebuilt by George Douglas Campbell, 8th Duke of Argyll in 1860 for Princess Louise, Duchess of Argyll. The castle and estate was sold in early 1940, ending 500 years of Clan Campbell ownership of Rosneath and the surrounding area.

== HMS Rosneath ==
Rosneath Bay was chosen as the area of the base as its location in Firth of Clyde provided deep water channels that were considered excellent for ship operations and sufficient land at Rosneath estate was provided that was both flat for tanks, combined with a hilly and wooded area that provided excellent protective coverage for buildings. The initial construction of the base was started when funds were provided as part of the Lend-Lease agreement. Contract workers and material started to arrive in June 1941. In July 1941, the American Civil Engineer Corps and Seabees along with civilian personnel arrived to find the Royal Engineers, 996 Dock Operating Company constructing a shallow water jetty for barges. In August 1941, 150 Irish workmen were contracted and began work immediately. Although shiploads of construction machinery arrived from the US, work was delayed due to the lack of a rock crusher, which meant the local quarry, which was 25 miles away, needed to be used for the delivery of aggregate. By December 1941, work was advanced, on the barracks, hospital, reservoirs, roads and the water filter and purification plant.

In the same month the US joined the war and the scope of work was reduced by one-third. Instead of the three specialities of submarine facilities, destroyer facilities and repair shops being offered at the base, it was decided to remove the destroyer facilities. Any work for the destroyer facilities was cancelled and the tank farm, hospital and support functions were all reduced in size, for the smaller size of base.

=== Operation Torch ===
Dock area at the Seabee base. Tanks and industrial section in centre foreground

On 24 August 1942, the base was again commissioned by the United States Navy to train amphibious craft sailors as part of combined operations preparations for the Allied invasion of French North Africa, that was known as Operation Torch. The most important training aspect of those preparations was a naval fire-fighting course, and a practice-landing course.

Rosneath House became the locus for planning Operation Torch. In November and December 1942, the 29th Seabees arrived to continue maintenance and construction in preparation for Operation Torch. The Seabees completed the marine railway, provided 20 Nissen huts for barracks, eight 10000 barrel fuel tanks with a pumping station and fuel lines. They also built a laundry and roads to service the area as well as renovating a number of buildings to provide a hospital and admin offices.

The Green Isle area of Rosneath which was heavily wooded area, provided ideal cover for a military camp that was capable of billeting 4500 men, who were part of the operation. Naval personnel who could not be billeted on site, numbering 6300 officers and men, stayed with families in Helensburgh. British commandos who were part of the combined operation also stayed in Helensburgh.

Once Operation Torch was completed, the base was returned to the Royal Navy on 1 February 1943, except for the facilities needed for US Submarine Squadron 50 which continued to operate, dock space for USS Beaver and the Seabee camp at Clachan House in Rosneath. All the American personnel were transferred to the Springtown base in Derry, except for the 230 Civil Engineer Corps.

=== Receiving station ===
Rosneath base tank farm.

On 20 August 1943, the base was again reactivated by the United States Navy, to act as the main receiving station for personnel who needed to be assigned to a specific vessel or location. During that year, up until August 1944, thousands of men arrived from the US, to be transferred to duties on ships and naval bases that were located all over the UK. The base provided training, supply and maintenance crews for increasingly larger units as the war progressed, including the 11th Amphibious Force consisting of 1900men. Other units were also supported that consisted of over 5000 sailors.

== Facilities ==
The wharf at the base measured 4750 lineal feet of deep-water berths as well as 1500 lineal feet of shallow-water berths. The base also included:

- 64 dolphin berths for Landing Craft Mechanized craft.
- A calibration and ship degaussing slipway.
- A marine railway for amphibious landing craft.
- An ammunition dump.
- 21 storage warehouses.
- 11, 10000 barrel fuel oil tanks.
- 10, 14400 gallon gasoline tanks.
- 153 air-raid shelters.
- Housing and facilities for 4500 men on-site.
- 10 miles of road.
- 1400 piles of between 65 and 80 feet and 400 piles of between 80 and 90 feet were used for the wharf and pier.

Slightly north of Rosneath was Camp Clachan that consisted of barracks and facilities for 400 men and used to house the 29th Seabees. In the two months between April and May 1942, 325 Americans, 1000 Irish and 250 British construction workers worked on constructing the camp. By June 1942, the base construction was well advanced. Huts at the base were divided into units, served from a single galley, with 500 men to a unit and 10 men per hut. Huts were placed in an irregular manner amongst the trees, interspersed with bomb shelters. A hospital was also constructed on a hillside overlooking the Firth of Clyde and contained 680 beds, designed in a fan shape with a galley at the centre. Portkil Hotel and cottage were repaired to use as accommodation. On the opposite side of the peninsula, approximately 3 miles from Rosneath, ammunition was stored in 14 stores measuring 20 x 50 feet.

=== Decommissioning ===
Industrial section of the Seebee base.

On 5 May 1945, the base was decommissioned by the US Navy and in June 1945 the Seabees left. In 1948, the base was decommissioned by the Royal Navy. At some point after the end of the war, the base was demolished to be replaced by new housing, a school and a church. Little evidence of the base remains.
