= SC-497-class submarine chaser =

Submarine chaser class

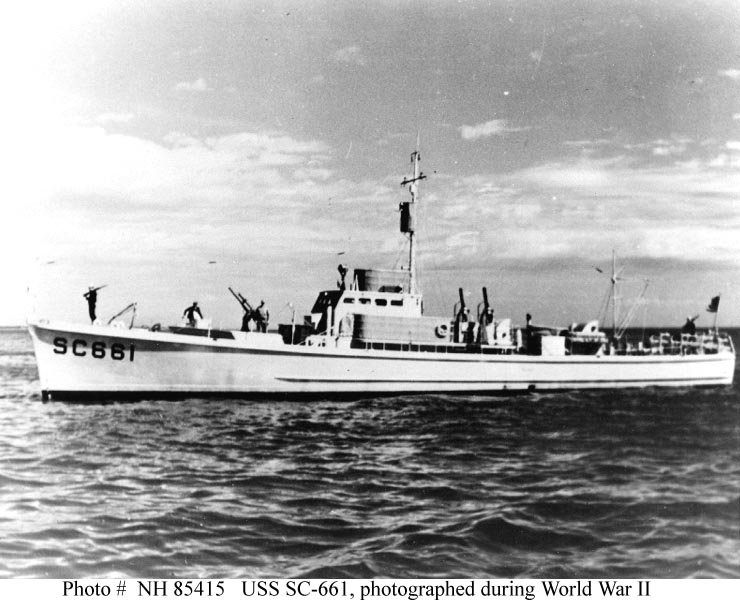
- USS SC-661

Class overview
- Operators: United States Navy; United States Coast Guard; Free French Naval Forces; French Navy; Soviet Navy; Brazilian Navy; Royal Norwegian Navy; Mexican Navy; Philippine Navy
- Preceded by: Prototype submarine chaser USS SC-453
- Built: 1941–1944
- Planned: 475
- Completed: 438
- Canceled: 37
- Active: 0
- Lost: 17
- Preserved: 1

General characteristics
- Type: Submarine chaser
- Displacement: 98 tons
- Length: 110 ft 10 in (34 m)
- Beam: 17 ft 11.5 in (5 m)
- Draft: 10 ft 10 in (3 m)
- Propulsion: 2 × 1,540 or 880 hp (1,150 or 660 kW) General Motors 16-184A or 8-268A 2-stroke diesel engines; 2 × shafts
- Speed: 21 or 15.6 knots (38.9 or 28.9 km/h; 24.2 or 18.0 mph)
- Complement: 3 officers, 25 enlisted
- Armament: 1 × 3"/23-caliber gun (later replaced with 1 × 40 mm Bofors); 2 × twin .50-caliber machine guns (later replaced by 2–3 single mounted 20 mm cannons); K-guns, depth charges
- Armor: Wooden hull

The SC-497-class submarine chasers were a class of 438 submarine chasers built primarily for the United States Navy from 1941–1944. The SC-497s were based on the experimental submarine chaser, USS SC-453. Submarine chasers of this variety were collectively nicknamed "the splinter fleet" due to their wooden hulls.

== History ==
The SC-497s were off-shore patrol and anti-submarine warfare vessels. Seventy of the SC-497s were converted into patrol control crafts (SCC), 18 were converted into coastal minesweepers (AMC), and 8 were converted into patrol gunboats, motor (PGM).

Sixteen SC-497s were lost and another one was lost after her conversion into a PGM-1-class motor gunboat.

Despite the large number of SC-497s, none are credited with destroying an enemy ship. USS SC-669 is sometimes incorrectly credited with sinking the Japanese submarine Ro-107 on 29 May 1943, but that submarine was still active on 6 July 1943.

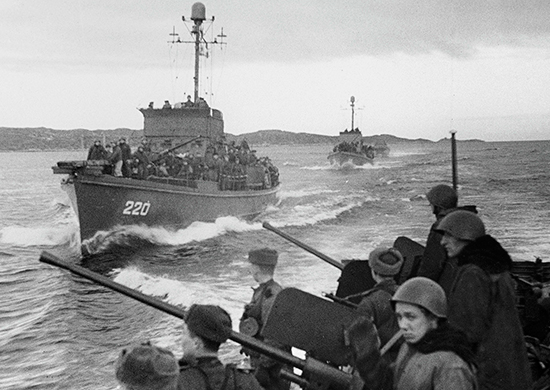
Soviet Northern Fleet naval infantrymen are on board SC-497-class submarine chasers during the Petsamo–Kirkenes offensive, 1944; BO-220 (ex–USS SC-1490) is in the foreground

During World War II, 142 SC-497-class submarine chasers were lent to allies of the United States as part of the Lend-Lease program. Seventy-eight were sent to the Soviet Union, 50 to France, 8 to Brazil, 3 to Norway, and 3 to Mexico. The three Norwegian examples served with distinction on the Shetland bus service, running agents, refugees and weapons past the German blockade between occupied Norway and Britain.

Following the end of the war, Operation Magic Carpet relocated American troops in Europe back to the United States. The most veteran personnel were first to be reassigned, which left inexperienced pilots to fly their aircraft. This led to an increase in accidents and crashes. In response, the US Coast Guard requested 70 surplus SC-497-class ships to operate as Air Rescue Vessels. The cutters were commissioned into the Coast Guard between late 1945 and 1946, but a severe shortage of post-war coast guardsmen prevented many of the ships from being operated. All of the ships were decommissioned by 1947 and referred to as the Air-class cutters. Each ship's name had the prefix "Air".

== Survivors ==
HNoMS Hitra (ex–USS SC-718) is preserved at the Royal Norwegian Navy Museum.

== See also ==
- SC-1-class submarine chaser
- SC-1466-class submarine chaser
- List of patrol vessels of the United States Navy
