= Submarine chaser =

Anti-submarine warfare ship type

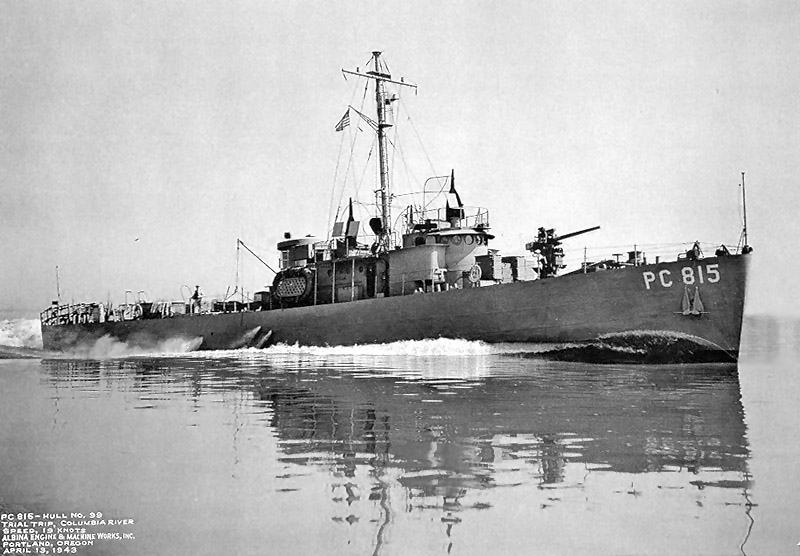
USS PC-815, a US subchaser that served in World War II

A submarine chaser or subchaser is a type of small naval vessel that is specifically intended for anti-submarine warfare. They encompass designs that are now largely obsolete, but which played an important role in the wars of the first half of the 20th century. Many of the American submarine chasers used in World War I found their way to Allied nations by way of Lend-Lease in World War II.

== Submarine chaser variants ==
U.S. Navy submarine chasers were designed specifically to destroy German submarines in World War I, and Japanese and German submarines in World War II. The small 110-foot (34 m) SC-1-class submarine chasers of the design used in World War I carried the hull designator SC (for Submarine Chaser). Their main weapon was the depth charge. They also carried machine guns and anti-aircraft guns. The similar-sized SC-497-class was built for World War II. Also in World War II, larger 173-foot (53 m) PC-461-class submarine chasers used the PC hull classification symbol (for Patrol, Coastal).

Class relationships:

- 438 SC-497-class submarine chaser (98t, wooden hull)
- 343 PC-461-class submarine chaser (450t, steel hull)
- 68 PCE-842-class patrol craft (850t, steel hull)
  - used in similar role as the submarine chasers
- 123 Admirable-class minesweeper
  - design basis for the PCE-842 class
  - equipped with substantial anti-submarine capabilities and used as escorts
- 95 Auk-class minesweeper (890t, steel hull)
  - predecessor design to the Admirable class
- 481 YMS-1-class minesweeper (270t, wooden hull)

In early 1915, the British Admiralty selected the US Electric Launch Company (Elco) for the production of 50 motor launches for anti-submarine work, British industry being at maximum capacity. This order was eventually increased by a further 530. The whole order was completed by November 1916, and the vessels entered Royal Navy service. The vessels were 80 feet (24 m) in length and capable of 20 knots (37 km/h). They were armed with a 3-pounder gun, towed paravanes to attack submarines and, later, depth charges. Additional motor launches of the Fairmile A, Fairmile B and other classes were built for World War II.

=== War service ===
The British sub chasers were operated around the coast in defence. However, they were uncomfortable, wet and not suited to British sea conditions. Although used during the First World War, they were sold when the war ended.

Submarine chasers were used mostly by the United States Coast Guard in World War II for destroying German U-boats that were stationed off the coast of the United States that were trying to sink merchant convoys as they departed American ports. In the Pacific Theatre, submarine chasers were used for amphibious landings, courier and escort duty.

Eight British Fairmile B motor launches were transferred from Canada to the US in World War II, and included the SC-1466 class of sub-chasers.

The Imperial Japanese Navy had around 250 submarine chasers in World War II, principally about 200 of the No.1-class auxiliary submarine chasers. Some of these survived to serve in the Japan Maritime Self Defense Force (JMSDF) after the war.

During Project Hula, the United States secretly transferred 32 U.S. Navy submarine chasers to the Soviet Union between 26 May and 2 September 1945, and some of these saw action in the Soviet Navy during Soviet military operations against the Japanese between 9 August and 2 September 1945. The transfer of 24 more was canceled when transfers halted on 5 September 1945, three days after the Japanese surrender. Between 1954 and 1960 all 32 transferred submarine chasers were scrapped by the Soviet Union or destroyed off its coast by mutual agreement between the two countries.

=== Post-war ===
In the decade immediately after World War II, the Soviet Union built 227 Kronshtadt-class submarine chasers, some of which remained in active service until the 1990s. Rapid developments in submarine technologies since World War II mean that submarine chasers are now obsolete, having been replaced by corvettes, frigates, and destroyers.

=== Survivors ===
The only remaining submarine chaser with intact World War II armament is the Royal Norwegian Navy's HNoMS Hitra, which is a touring museum today. A World War II type submarine chaser built in 1953, originally PC1610, is being restored in the Netherlands as Le Fougueux.

== See also ==
- Harbour defence motor launch
- List of escorteurs of the French Navy
- List of patrol vessels of the United States Navy
- Wooden boats of World War II

== General bibliography ==
- Gardiner, Robert, Conway's All the World's Fighting Ships 1906–1921 Conway Maritime Press, 1985. ISBN 0-85177-245-5.
- Gardiner, Robert and Chesneau, Roger, Conway's All the World's Fighting Ships 1922–1946, Conway Maritime Press, 1980. ISBN 0-83170-303-2.
- Watts, Anthony J., Japanese Warships of World War II, Doubleday, 1966. ISBN 0-385-09189-3.
- Wright, Charles W. Jr., ed. (2005). "Question 9/03: USN Subchaser Sales After WW I". Ask Infoser. Warship International. XLII (1): 17–20. ISSN 0043-0374. JSTOR 44893202.
