= USS Boxwood =

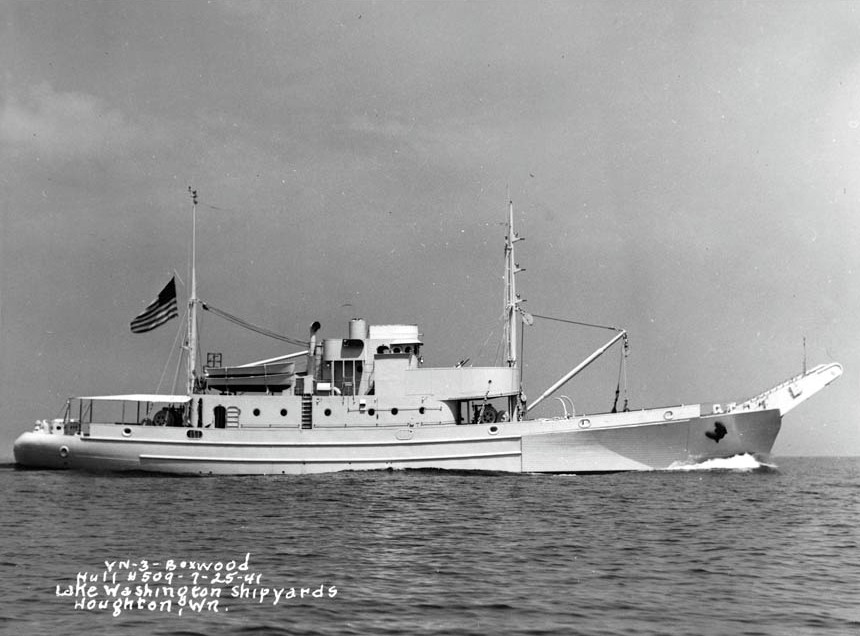
- Boxwood underway near Houghton, Washington, 25 July 1941, the day of her commissioning

History

United States
- Name: USS Boxwood
- Namesake: An evergreen shrub, or small tree, used extensively for hedges, borders, and topiary figures because of its slow growth and its full and compact foliage
- Ordered: as Birch (YN-3)
- Builder: Lake Washington Shipyards, Houghton, Washington
- Laid down: 19 November 1940
- Launched: 8 March 1941
- Commissioned: 2 January 1943 as USS Boxwood (YN-3)
- Decommissioned: 13 November 1946 at Portland, Oregon
- In service: 25 July 1941 as Boxwood (YN-3) at Puget Sound Navy Yard
- Renamed: to Boxwood, 16 October 1940
- Reclassified: AN-8, 20 January 1944
- Stricken: 9 October 1962
- Home port: Tiburon, California
- Fate: Transferred to the U.S. Maritime Administration; fate unknown

General characteristics
- Type: Aloe-class net laying ship
- Tonnage: 560 tons
- Displacement: 850 tons
- Length: 163 ft 2 in (49.73 m)
- Beam: 30 ft 6 in (9.30 m)
- Draft: 11 ft 8 in (3.56 m)
- Propulsion: diesel engine, single screw
- Speed: 12.5 knots
- Complement: 44 officers and enlisted
- Armament: one single 3 in (76 mm) dual purpose gun mount; three single 20 mm AA gun mounts; one y-gun

USS Boxwood (YN-3/AN-8) was an Aloe-class net laying ship which was assigned to serve U.S. Navy ships and harbors during World War II with her protective anti-submarine nets.

== Career ==
Boxwood (YN-3)—originally named Birch but renamed before her construction began—was laid down on 19 November 1940 at Houghton, Washington, by the Lake Washington Shipyard; launched on 8 March 1941; and placed in service on 25 July 1941 at the Puget Sound Navy Yard, Bremerton, Washington. Assigned to duty with the Inshore Patrol, 13th Naval District, the net tender reported to the section headquarters at Seattle, Washington, on 6 August and commenced operating between that port, Port Townsend, and Port Angeles, performing various towing tasks within the district. One typical chore was her towing of targets for the gunboat USS Charleston during September and October 1941.

The Japanese attack on Pearl Harbor on 7 December 1941 prompted a flurry of defensive activity along the U.S. West Coast. The plans for the net defense of the Puget Sound area having been worked out in advance, Boxwood joined Butternut and Eucalyptus in installing the Rich Pass antisubmarine net line in Puget Sound, commencing the work soon after 7 December and bringing it to completion on 27 January 1942. Over the ensuing weeks, Boxwood remained on station in the Rich Pass area, maintaining the net line and occasionally conducting local patrol work.

On 16 February, Boxwood sailed for Indian Island, Washington, and was soon busily engaged in work at the Net Depot there, installing an antisubmarine net line at Port Townsend, a combination antisubmarine and anti-torpedo net line at Marrowstone Spit, and a fine mesh net line across the Portage Canal. She completed the installation of approximately a mile and a half of netting on 11 July and remained in the Puget Sound area tending nets for the remainder of 1942. Placed in full commission on 2 January 1943, Boxwood resumed her tending tasks after her overhaul at Todd, Seattle, shipyard and carried them out through the spring of 1943.

== Alaskan duty ==
Departing the Seattle area on 26 June 1943, Boxwood relieved Buckeye at Adak, in the Aleutians, and assisted in the installation of antitorpedo net lines at Adak and Sand Bay, and helped in laying fleet mooring buoys. After tending nets in the Adak area during the invasion of Kiska, Boxwood proceeded to Kiska as a replacement for a destroyer operating off that island and thus gained the distinction of being the first net tender in that area. Soon after Boxwood's arrival, Buckeye joined her; and the two ships installed cruiser moorings in Kiska harbor, as well as approximately two miles of a combination anti-torpedo and submarine-indicator net.

Resuming her duties at Adak in October 1943, Boxwood later received minor damage while assisting the grounded destroyer King in Kulak Bay. During her operations in these northern climes, Boxwood was redesignated AN-8 on 20 January 1944.

Ordered to Kiska on 15 February 1944, Boxwood proceeded thence and repaired some of the cruiser moorings that she had laid there earlier. Completing this task by 27 February, the net tender sailed to Attu, where she tended net defenses until relieved by Buckthorn on 26 September. Upon completion of repairs and alterations at Adak on 31 October, Boxwood resumed tending the net defenses there early in November 1944. Subsequently ordered to Attu on 10 January 1945, Boxwood arrived on station two days later and relieved Buckthorn. Relieved by that ship on 22 June 1945 to return to Adak for overhaul, Boxwood was still undergoing repairs and alterations when Japan capitulated in mid-August 1945. Upon completion of the overhaul on 20 August 1945, Boxwood resumed her net tending tasks, only to receive orders to begin removing the net defenses at Adak on the 21st. Assisted by Buckthorn and Mulberry, Boxwood finished this work by 14 September.

Boxwood sailed for Kodiak, Alaska, on 6 October and served there until 28 November when she was ordered to Dutch Harbor. Attached to the naval operating base there, Boxwood performed utility jobs such as transporting mail and stores to nearby island bases and decommissioned the radio station at Caton Island, Alaska. During 1946, Boxwood made several trips carrying passengers and mail between various bases in the Alaskan Sea Frontier and the naval station at Seattle, Washington, through mid-August 1946 when she entered the Puget Sound Naval Shipyard.

In the fall of 1946, Boxwood underwent a preinactivation overhaul at the Kaiser Shipyard, Vancouver, Washington. She was decommissioned on 13 November 1946 and was turned over to the Portland, Oregon, Sub-group of the 19th Fleet and moored at Swan Island, Portland, Oregon. She remained inactive until her name was struck from the Navy List on 9 October 1962. Shifted to the National Defense Reserve Fleet at Suisun Bay, California, the ship was carried on vessel inventory reports through the end of 1974. Subsequent fate not known.
