= USS Hazel (AN-29) =

Net laying ship (1941–1958)

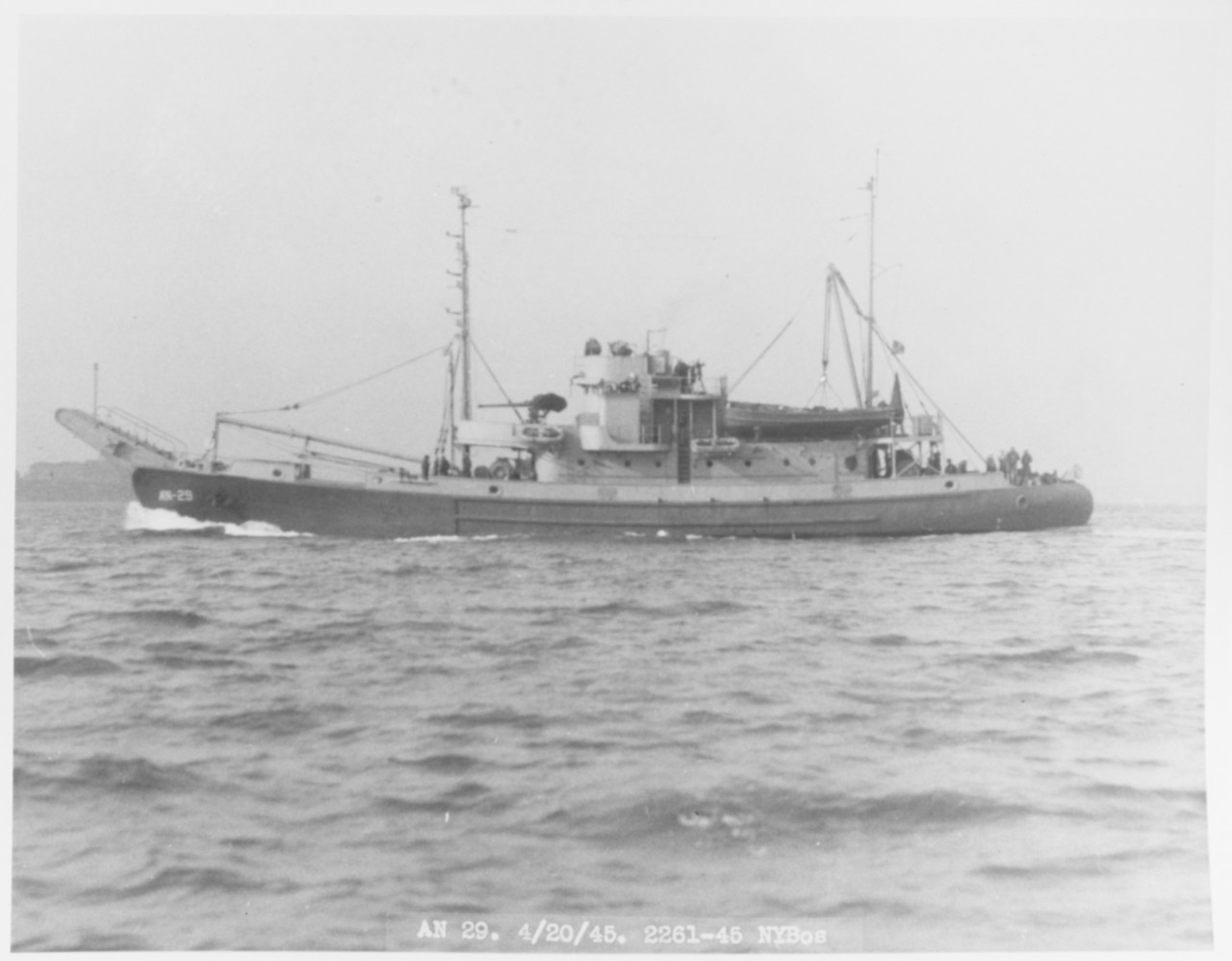
- Hazel off Boston in 1945

History

United States
- Name: USS Hazel
- Namesake: small tree or shrub which bears the hazelnut, or filbert
- Builder: American Shipbuilding Company, Cleveland, Ohio
- Laid down: as Poplar (YN-24)
- Launched: 15 February 1941
- Commissioned: 17 December 1942 as USS Hazel (YN-24)
- Decommissioned: 11 February 1958, at Mayport, Florida
- In service: 27 October 1941 as Hazel (YN-24)
- Renamed: Hazel prior to launching
- Reclassified: AN-29, 20 January 1944
- Stricken: 1 September 1962
- Fate: Placed in reserve at Green Cove Springs, Florida

General characteristics
- Type: Aloe-class net laying ship
- Tonnage: 560 tons
- Displacement: 850 tons
- Length: 163 ft 2 in (49.73 m)
- Beam: 30 ft 6 in (9.30 m)
- Draft: 11 ft 8 in (3.56 m)
- Propulsion: Diesel
- Speed: 12.5 knots
- Complement: 48 officers and enlisted
- Armament: one single 3 in (76 mm) gun mount, two .30 cal. machine guns, two depth charge tracks

The second USS Hazel (AN-29/YN-24) was an Aloe-class net laying ship which was assigned to serve the U.S. Navy during World War II with her protective anti-submarine nets.

== Built in Lorain, Ohio ==
Hazel (YN-24), originally Poplar but renamed soon after keel-laying, was launched 15 February 1941 by American Shipbuilding Company, Lorain, Ohio, and was placed in service 27 October 1941. She commissioned 17 December 1942 at Newport, Rhode Island, Lt. (j.g.) A. W. Brown commanding.

== World War II service ==
After being placed in service, Hazel steamed to Portsmouth, New Hampshire, and Boston, Massachusetts, where her outfitting was completed. She performed net laying duties at Portland, Maine, and had returned to Boston by the fateful morning of America's entry into the war, 7 December 1941.

Following the attack on Pearl Harbor, the net tender was assigned to Newport, where she performed patrol duties in addition to installing and maintaining the anti-submarine net. Hazel commissioned in December 1942, and remained in the Narragansett Bay area, based at the Naval Net Depot, Melville, Rhode Island. She occasionally performed patrol and fire fighting duties in addition to net tending and installation.

Hazel was redesignated AN-29, 20 January 1944 and after spending October–November 1944 at Portland, Maine, returned to Newport to train officers and men in net defenses and do experimental work for the net depot. She arrived Boston, Massachusetts, 21 February 1945 to work on the Boston Harbor nets, and in the spring was assigned to the Panama Canal Zone. Hazel departed Boston 20 April and arrived Cristobal 2 May 1945.

Tending nets in the Panama Canal Zone defense system until the end of the war, Hazel then took on the large task of removing the intricate defenses from the Canal and its approaches. This was completed 14 October 1945 and the ship returned to its base at Coco Solo. She remained in the 15th Naval District performing miscellaneous duties at Coco Solo, Balboa, and other installations until 2 December 1957, when she departed for Florida.

== Post-war decommissioning ==
Hazel arrived Mayport, Florida, 9 December and decommissioned 11 February 1958. She was placed in reserve at Green Cove Springs, Florida, where she remained until struck from the Navy List 1 September 1962.
