= USS Aloe =

1941 Aloe-class net laying ship

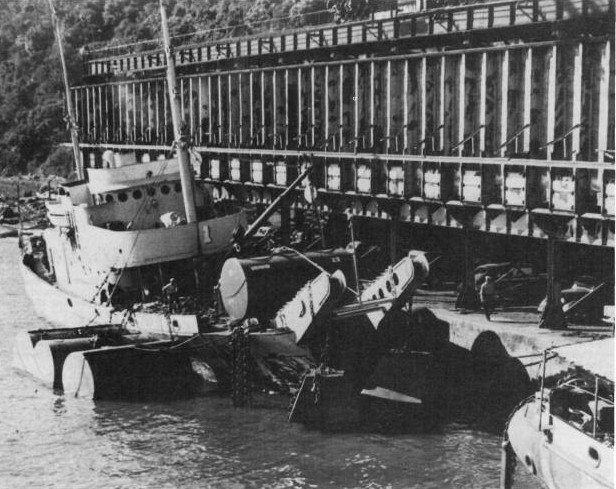
- Aloe (YN-1), at the net depot at Tiburon, California, 1941. The ship is painted in the then-standard prewar No. 5 Navy gray, and carries her hull number (1) just forward of her foremast.

History

United States
- Name: USS Aloe
- Namesake: Aloe, also written Aloë, is a genus containing about four hundred species of flowering succulent plants.
- Builder: Lake Washington Shipyards, Houghton, Washington
- Laid down: 14 October 1940, as (YN-1)
- Launched: 11 January 1941
- Commissioned: 30 December 1942 as USS Aloe (YN-1)
- Decommissioned: 3 August 1946, at Portland, Oregon
- In service: 11 June 1941
- Reclassified: AN-6, 31 January 1944
- Stricken: 9 October 1962
- Home port: Tiburon, California
- Honours and awards: three battle stars for her World War II service
- Fate: Sold for scrapping, 14 May 1971

General characteristics
- Type: Aloe-class net laying ship
- Tonnage: 560 tons
- Displacement: 805 tons
- Length: 163 ft 2 in (49.73 m)
- Beam: 30 ft 6 in (9.30 m)
- Draft: 11 ft 8 in (3.56 m)
- Propulsion: diesel engine, single propeller
- Speed: 12.5 knots
- Complement: 48 officers and enlisted
- Armament: one single 3 in (76 mm) dual purpose gun mount; two 0.5 in (12.7 mm) machine guns

USS Aloe (AN-6/YN-1) was an Aloe-class net laying ship which was assigned to serve U.S. Navy ships and harbors during World War II with her protective anti-submarine nets.

== Built in Washington ==
Aloe (YN-1) was laid down on 14 October 1940 at Houghton, Washington, by the Lake Washington Shipyard; launched on 11 January 1941; and placed "in service" on 11 June 1941.

== World War II service ==
Allocated to the 12th Naval District, the net tender operated in a non-commissioned status in the San Francisco, area from the summer of 1941 to the winter of 1942, tending and laying the antisubmarine nets and booms protecting the waters of that important region.

=== Assigned to the South Pacific ===
Commissioned on 30 December 1942, Aloe departed San Francisco on 22 January 1943, bound for Pearl Harbor. Routed thence to New Caledonia, she reached Noumea on 18 March. Six days later, she got underway and proceeded via the New Hebrides, to the Solomon Islands.

The net tender spent the remainder of the war in the Pacific Ocean, laying and tending torpedo nets and buoys, and conducting various salvage and towing operations. She ranged from New Caledonia to Okinawa and included the Solomon Islands, the Mariana Islands, the Marshall Islands, and the Palau Islands in her itinerary. During this time, she was reclassified as a net layer, on 31 January 1944, her hull number becoming AN-6 on that date.

While perhaps pedestrian, Aloe's duties were, nevertheless, vital and certainly not without hazard, as was dramatically demonstrated soon after she arrived in the Solomons in the spring of 1943.

=== Under attack at Tulagi ===
On 7 April of that year, she lay moored to the Sturgis Dock, Tulagi, when 67 "Vals" (Aichi D3A2 dive bombers), escorted by 110 "Zero" fighters—all but a very few of which had been drawn from the complements of four Japanese aircraft carriers—arrived to attack the shipping in the harbor there. The raid was a part of Admiral Yamamoto's Operation "I"—a series of massive air attacks aimed at American positions in the Solomons. Obviously interested in bigger game, the Japanese planes left Aloe alone, sinking destroyer Aaron Ward and an oiler and damaging a second oiler and cargo ship. Nevertheless, the net tender, with her solitary 3-inch gun and her four .50-caliber machine guns, contributed to the antiaircraft barrage that helped to drive the attackers off, claiming one "Val" shot down, another "possibly" splashed, and a third "damaged."

=== Shooting down enemy planes in the Marianas ===
A little over a year later, Aloe next encountered the enemy during Operation "Forager" – the occupation of the Marianas. While in Task Group (TG) 53.16 on 18 June 1944, the net-layer was cruising east of Guam when Japanese planes attacked at 17:59. Utilizing local control and observing excellent fire discipline, Aloe's 20 mm and .50-caliber batteries scored hits on three enemy planes. Two of these Japanese aircraft crashed and the third departed the area in flames.

Her last action with enemy planes came on 28 May 1945, while she was anchored in Nakagusuku Wan, Okinawa, serving as part of Net and Buoy Unit 3 (Task Unit 32.8.3). During that morning, she took a suicider under fire with all her guns as the kamikaze made a dive on the anchorage.

=== Damaged in a typhoon ===
War's end in August 1945, found Aloe still at Okinawa. While her battle with the Japanese may have been over, there were still the "elements" with which to contend. On 9 October 1945, a typhoon swept across Okinawa. During the storm, Snowbell (AN-52) inflicted minor damage on Aloe when the former drifted down on her. Snowbell's stern collided with Aloe's starboard bow and ripped a hole below the main deck level five feet long.

== Post-war inactivation ==
Returning to the United States in the spring of 1946 via Saipan, Guam, the Marshalls, and Hawaii, Aloe commenced her pre-inactivation overhaul at Swan Island, Portland, Oregon, on 3 June 1946.

Decommissioned on 3 August 1946 and placed in reserve on 26 September 1946, the net tender remained in the Columbia River Group, Pacific Reserve Fleet, through the 1950s. Her name was stricken on 9 October 1962. Laid up in the U.S. Maritime Administration berthing area at Olympia, Washington, the ship was sold on 14 May 1971 to I. D. Logan and was scrapped.

The USS Aloe is featured in a mural depicting the history of the Houghton area of Kirkland, Washington.

== Honors and awards ==
Aloe received three battle stars for her World War II service.
