= USS Teaberry =

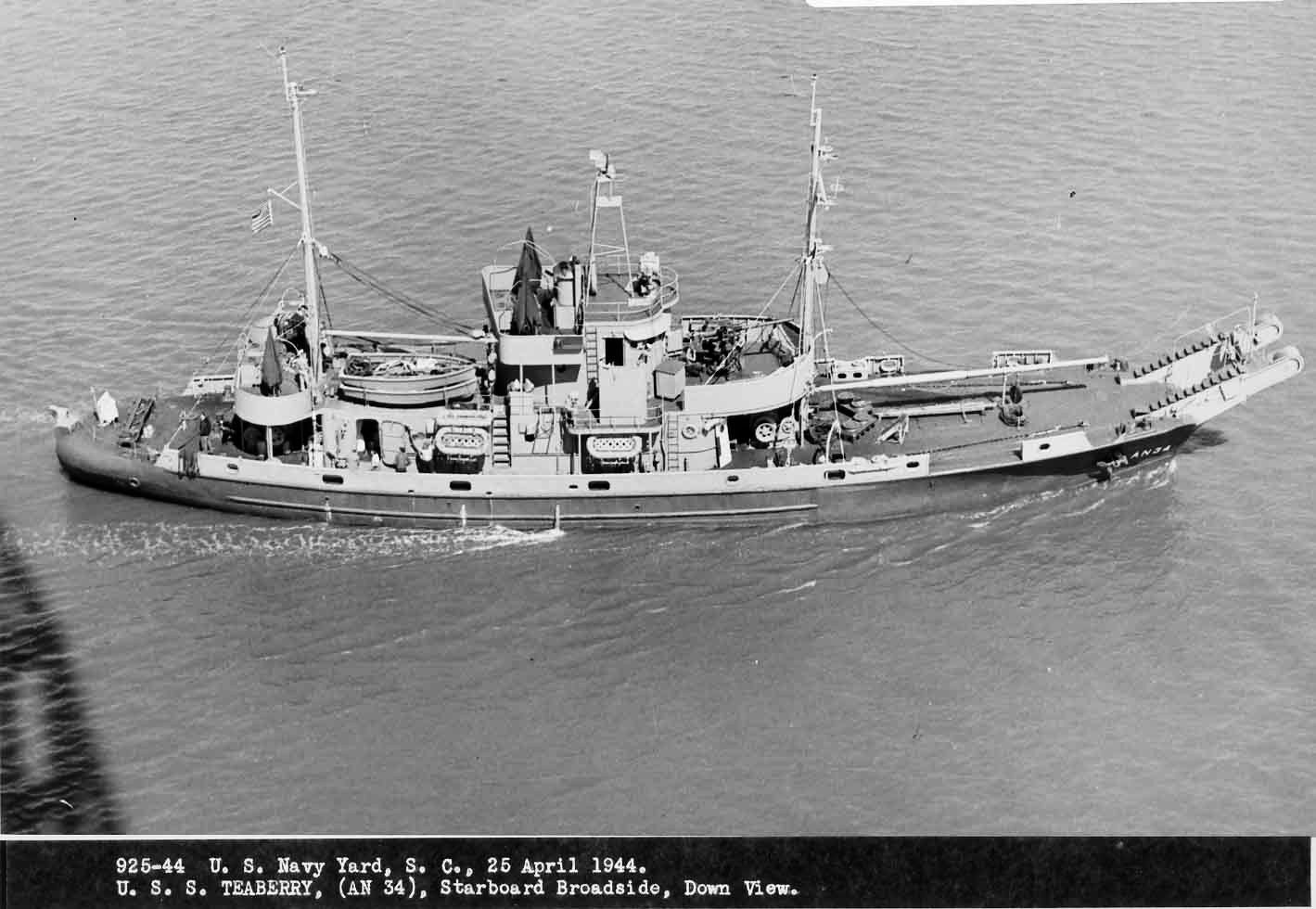

History

United States
- Name: USS Teaberry
- Namesake: Any of several American evergreen plants which bear white, bell-shaped flowers and spicy red berries
- Builder: John H. Mathis & Company, Camden, New Jersey
- Laid down: 25 October 1940 as YN-29
- Launched: 24 May 1941
- Sponsored by: Miss Mary C. Howard
- Commissioned: as USS Teaberry (YN-29), date unknown
- Recommissioned: 19 April 1952
- Decommissioned: 14 December 1946, at Astoria, Oregon, and on 7 July 1961
- In service: 16 March 1942 as Teaberry (YN-29)
- Reclassified: AN-34, 20 January 1944
- Stricken: 1 August 1961
- Home port: San Francisco, California
- Honors and awards: one battle star for World War II service
- Fate: Sold 12 January 1962 for scrapping

General characteristics
- Type: Aloe-class net laying ship
- Tonnage: 560 tons
- Displacement: 850 tons
- Length: 163 ft 2 in (49.73 m)
- Beam: 30 ft 6 in (9.30 m)
- Draft: 11 ft 8 in (3.56 m)
- Propulsion: diesel engine, single propeller
- Speed: 12.5 knots
- Complement: 48 officers and enlisted
- Armament: one single 3 in (76 mm) gun mount, two 20 mm guns

USS Teaberry (AN-34/YN-29) was an Aloe-class net laying ship which was assigned to serve the U.S. Pacific Fleet during World War II with her protective anti-submarine nets and, at war's end, returned home safety with one battle star to her credit. She was later reactivated for duty during the Korean War era.

== Built in Camden, New Jersey ==
Teaberry (YN-29) was laid down on 25 October 1940 by John H. Mathis & Company, Camden, New Jersey; launched on 24 May 1941; sponsored by Miss Mary C. Howard; and placed in service on 16 March 1942.

== World War II service ==
Teaberry operated in the 1st Naval District out of Boston, Massachusetts, until February 1943 when she shifted to the 7th Naval District at Miami, Florida. Late in March, she was ordered to Trinidad and operated from there until 8 March 1944 when she steamed to Charleston, South Carolina, to prepare for service in the South Pacific Ocean.

In May, Teaberry sailed for New Guinea via Miami, Florida, Guantanamo Bay, the Panama Canal, Bora Bora, and New Caledonia. Upon arrival at Milne Bay on 22 July, she provided services to units of the U.S. 7th Fleet and operated out of that port, Langemak, and Hollandia, until ordered to the Philippine Islands early in 1945. The net layer served there until 4 June 1946 when she headed for Hawaii.

Teaberry arrived at Pearl Harbor on 9 July and, on the 14th, proceeded to the U.S. West Coast. The ship was at San Francisco, California, from 24 July to 9 October when she was assigned to the 19th Reserve Fleet at Astoria, Oregon. She was placed out of commission, in reserve, on 14 December 1946.

== Recommissioned during the Korean War ==
Teaberry was recommissioned at Astoria, Oregon, on 19 April 1952 and assigned to the 12th Naval District with San Francisco designated as her home port. She arrived there on 13 May and served in the 12th Naval District until July 1961, rendering such services to the fleet as: training students in net and boom defense techniques; working with the Research and Development Division of the Naval Net Depot, Tiburon, California; and participating in mine planting and recovery exercises.

By August 1953, the ship had been equipped as a "diving-type vessel;" and she assisted the Submarine Force, United States Pacific Fleet, in submarine rescue, surface and aerial torpedo recovery, and submarine communications.

== Final decommissioning ==
Teaberry was again decommissioned on 7 July 1961 and struck from the Navy List on 1 August 1961. On 12 January 1962, Teaberry was sold to the Pacific Towboat and Salvage Co., for scrap.

== Honors and awards ==
Teaberry earned one battle star (for Leyte operation) during World War II.
