= USS Catalpa (AN-10) =

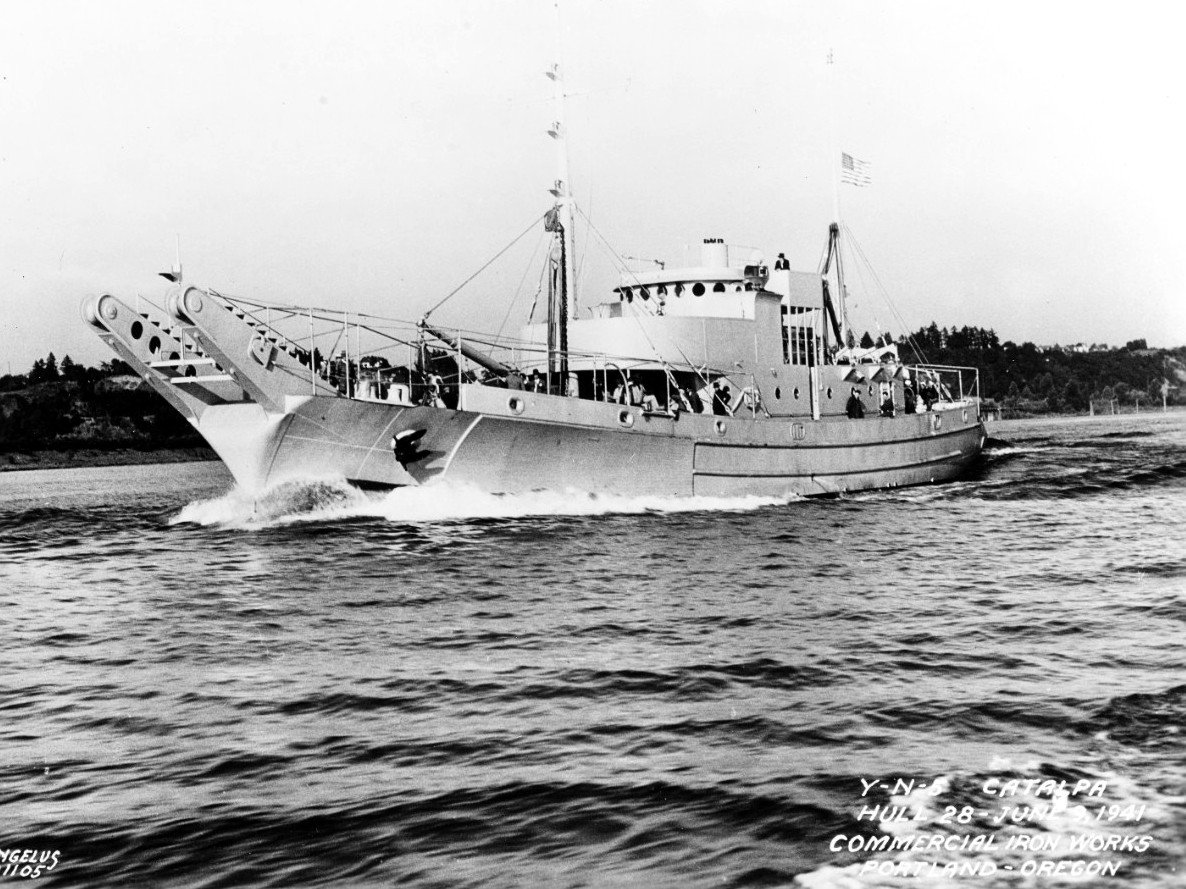
- Catalpa underway off Portland, Oregon, 9 June 1941, during builders trials

History

United States
- Name: USS Catalpa
- Namesake: A tree of China, Japan, and North America
- Builder: Commercial Iron Works, Portland, Oregon
- Laid down: as YN-5, date unknown
- Launched: 22 February 1941
- Sponsored by: Mrs. E. B. Colton
- Commissioned: 22 May 1942 as USS Catalpa (YN-5) at Alameda, California
- Recommissioned: 7 August 1950
- Decommissioned: 21 October 1946, at Astoria, Oregon; 7 October 1955, at New London, Connecticut
- In service: as Catalpa (YN-5), date unknown
- Reclassified: AN-10, 20 January 1944
- Stricken: Unknown
- Home port: Tiburon, California
- Honours and awards: two battle stars for World War II service
- Fate: Fate unknown

General characteristics
- Type: Aloe-class net laying ship
- Tonnage: 560 tons
- Displacement: 850 tons
- Length: 163 ft 2 in (49.73 m)
- Beam: 30 ft 6 in (9.30 m)
- Draft: 11 ft 8 in (3.56 m)
- Propulsion: diesel engine
- Speed: 12.5 knots
- Complement: 44 officers and enlisted
- Armament: one single 3 in (76 mm) gun mount, three 20 mm guns, one y-gun

USS Catalpa (AN-10/YN-5) was an Aloe-class net laying ship which was assigned to serve the U.S. Navy ships and harbors during World War II with her protective anti-submarine nets.

== Built in Portland, Oregon ==
The second ship to be so named by the Navy, Catalpa (YN-5) was launched 22 February 1941 by Commercial Iron Works, Portland, Oregon; sponsored by Mrs. E. B. Colton; and on 20 June 1941 placed in service for duty in the 12th Naval District. She was commissioned 22 May 1942 at Alameda, California.

== World War service ==
After loading equipment at the Net Depot at Tiburon, California, Catalpa sailed 24 May 1942 for the Fiji Islands, arriving 14 June. At Nandi, Suva, and during October and November 1942 at Funafuti in the Ellice Islands, Catalpa laid and cared for harbor entrance nets, protecting important South Pacific Ocean bases. Early in 1944, she sailed to Dunedin, New Zealand, for overhaul, during which on 20 January she was redesignated AN-10.

Catalpa arrived at Cape Torokina, Bougainville, 20 February 1944 to carry out varied duties in the Solomon Islands through the spring and summer. In addition to tending nets, she laid mooring buoys, offered towing and salvage services, and provided divers for the services essential to the maintenance of fleet anchorages.

Early in September, she joined forces at Guadalcanal staging for the invasion of the Palau Islands, a vital preparation for the return to the Philippines. With the assault forces, she arrived off Peleliu on 15 September, and after standing by as the first troops smashed ashore, sailed on to mine-infested Kossol Passage to begin the work of preparing what would become a major fleet anchorage. Net and salvage operations in the Palaus were Catalpa's contribution to the continuing operations there and in the Philippines until 28 February 1945 when she got underway for Ulithi and Eniwetok.

== Post-war inactivation ==
She operated in the Marshall Islands until 30 June when she cleared for duty in the Eleventh Naval District from San Pedro, California. On 23 July 1946 she sailed for Astoria, Oregon, where she was decommissioned and placed in reserve 21 October 1946.

== Korean War era service ==
With the buildup of the fleet brought into effect upon the outbreak of hostilities in Korea, Catalpa was re-commissioned 7 August 1950 and reported to the net depot in San Francisco Bay for training and local duty.

On 1 February 1952, she sailed from San Diego, California, for the Far East, and through 1954 installed and tended nets in Tokyo Bay, except for a period in the fall of 1953 when she carried out similar duties at Guam.

== Final decommissioning ==
On 23 January 1955 she cleared for New London, Connecticut, where she arrived 4 May. She was placed out of commission in reserve there 7 October 1955.

== Honors and awards ==
Catalpa received two battle stars for World War II service.
