= USS Mango =

History

United States
- Name: USS Mango
- Namesake: The evergreen tree of the sumac family that bears a yellowish red tropical fruit with a firm skin, hard central stone, and juicy pulp
- Builder: American Shipbuilding Company, Cleveland, Ohio
- Laid down: 18 October 1940
- Launched: 22 February 1941
- Commissioned: 15 December 1942 as USS Mango (YN-19)
- Decommissioned: 4 April 1947, at Astoria, Oregon
- In service: 18 September 1941 as Mango (YN-19)
- Reclassified: AN-24, 20 January 1944
- Stricken: 1 September 1962
- Honours and awards: one battle star for World War II service
- Fate: Delivered to the U.S. Maritime Administration, 1 September 1962

General characteristics
- Type: Aloe-class net laying ship
- Tonnage: 560 tons
- Displacement: 850 tons
- Length: 163 ft 2 in (49.73 m)
- Beam: 30 ft 6 in (9.30 m)
- Draft: 11 ft 8 in (3.56 m)
- Propulsion: Diesel
- Speed: 12.5 knots
- Complement: 48 officers and enlisted
- Armament: one single 3 in (76 mm) gun mount, four 20 mm guns

USS Mango (AN-24/YN-19) was an Aloe-class net laying ship which was assigned to serve the U.S. Navy during World War II with her protective anti-submarine nets.

== Built at Cleveland, Ohio ==
Mango (YN 19) was laid down 18 October 1940 by American Shipbuilding Company, Cleveland, Ohio; launched 22 February 1941; and placed in service 18 September 1941 for passage down the St. Lawrence River to the Portsmouth Navy Yard, Portsmouth, New Hampshire, where she was fitted out. She arrived off Casco Bay, Portland, Maine, in December to start a year of net laying and acting as gate vessel. Mango commissioned 15 December 1942.

== World War II service ==
Mango moved to Boston, Massachusetts, in January 1943. Two months later she steamed for Argentia, Newfoundland, where she continued to serve as gate vessel until 18 August when she returned to the U.S. East Coast, via Sydney and Halifax, Nova Scotia, arriving Boston, Massachusetts, 29 August.

By the end of October Mango was underway for Coco Solo, Panama Canal Zone, to spend 1944 tending nets off the Atlantic Ocean coast of Panama. She was reclassified AN-24 on 20 January 1944.

Mango sailed from Mount Hope, Panama Canal Zone, for the Pacific Ocean War Zone late in February 1945. For the next 4 months she alternated escort service with net replacement duties in the triangle of the Admiralty Islands, the Philippines, and New Guinea.

The ship departed Samar, Philippines, for Borneo in the middle of June, arriving 24 June to begin marking out the beachhead landing assault path to Balikpapan. Following D-Day, 1 July, she laid out the channel to the harbor.

== End-of-war activity ==
On 15 July Mango steamed for Samar and was in overhaul when hostilities ceased 15 August. Assigned the removal of the net defenses, she began at Samar 10 September and continued on to Manus, arriving 15 October, to resume operations in the Admiralties until the end of 1945.

The net laying ship returned to the Philippines to serve off Leyte from 15 January 1946 until the middle of September. Her net removing tasks took her to Guam, Mariana Islands, and to Eniwetok and Kwajalein in the Marshalls before she arrived Pearl Harbor 15 November.

== Post-war decommissioning ==
Mango shortly departed Pearl Harbor for the U.S. West Coast, arriving Astoria, Oregon, 27 January 1947. She decommissioned 4 April 1947 and entered the Pacific Reserve Fleet at Columbia River, Oregon. On 1 September 1962 Mango was struck from the Navy List; delivered to the U.S. Maritime Commission the same day; and berthed with the National Defense Reserve Fleet at Suisun Bay, California, where she remains into 1969.

== Honors and awards ==
Mango received one battle star for World War II service.
