= USS Gum Tree =

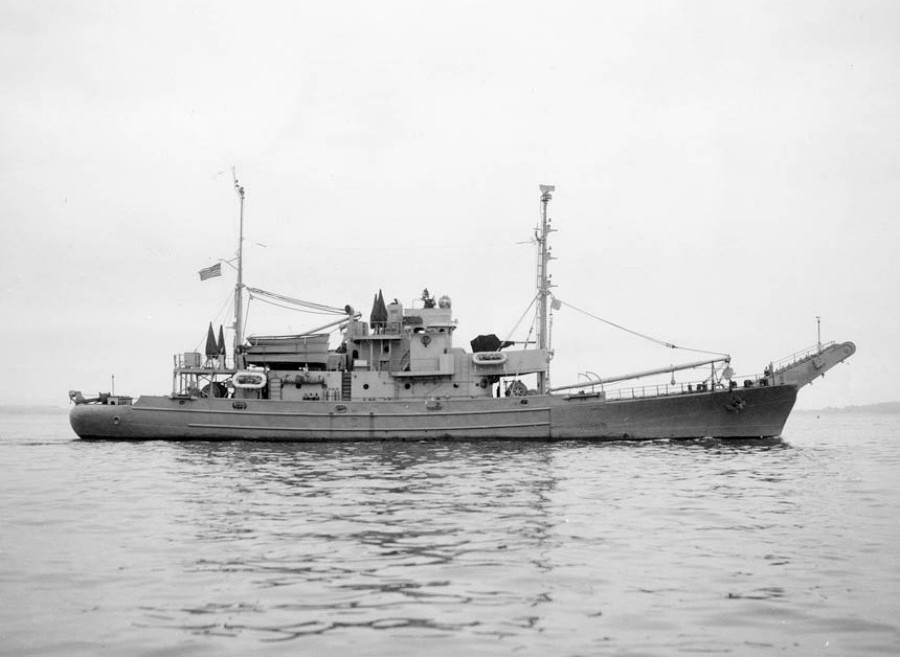
- Gum Tree near the Boston Navy Yard, 20 September 1944

History

United States
- Name: USS Gum Tree
- Namesake: A gum-producing tree
- Builder: Marietta Manufacturing Co., Point Pleasant, West Virginia
- Laid down: as (YN-13), 3 October 1940
- Launched: 20 March 1941
- Commissioned: 16 September 1941 as USS Gum Tree (YN-13)
- Decommissioned: 20 June 1946 at Orange, Texas
- Reclassified: AN-18, 20 January 1944
- Stricken: 7 February 1947
- Home port: Casco Bay
- Fate: transferred 27 February 1948 to the U.S. Maritime Commission at Lake Charles, Louisiana

General characteristics
- Class & type: Aloe-class net laying ship
- Tonnage: 560 tons
- Displacement: 700 tons
- Length: 151 ft 8 in (46.23 m)
- Beam: 30 ft 6 in (9.30 m)
- Draft: 10 ft 6 in (3.20 m)
- Propulsion: Diesel
- Speed: 15 knots
- Complement: 40 officers and enlisted
- Armament: one single 3 in (76 mm) gun mount, three 20 mm guns, one y-gun

USS Gum Tree (AN-18/YN-13) was an Aloe-class net laying ship which was assigned to serve the U.S. Navy during World War II with her protective anti-submarine nets.

== Built in West Virginia ==
Gum Tree (YN-13) was launched 20 March 1941 by the Marietta Manufacturing Co., Point Pleasant, West Virginia; commissioned 16 September 1941, Algiers, Louisiana.

== World War II service ==
After shakedown in the Gulf of Mexico and Mississippi River, Gum Tree sailed for Newfoundland on 25 September 1941, reaching Argentia, Newfoundland, 25 January 1942 after touching at Key West, Florida; New York City; Newport, Rhode Island; Boston, Massachusetts; and, Halifax, Nova Scotia.

She spent the following 17 months laying and tending nets off Newfoundland and then returned to the States for overhaul. Casco Bay, off Portland, Maine, was Gum Tree's home port for the remainder of the war as she tended harbor defenses there.

Her designation was changed to AN-18 20 January 1944. In September 1945, the net-tender participated in some experimental net operations at Melville, Rhode Island, and then was ordered to Orange, Texas, where she arrived 6 December 1945.

== Post-war decommissioning ==
Gum Tree decommissioned at Orange, Texas, 20 June 1946 and was struck from the Navy List 7 February 1947. She was transferred 27 February 1948 to the U.S. Maritime Commission at Lake Charles, Louisiana.
