= USS Redwood =

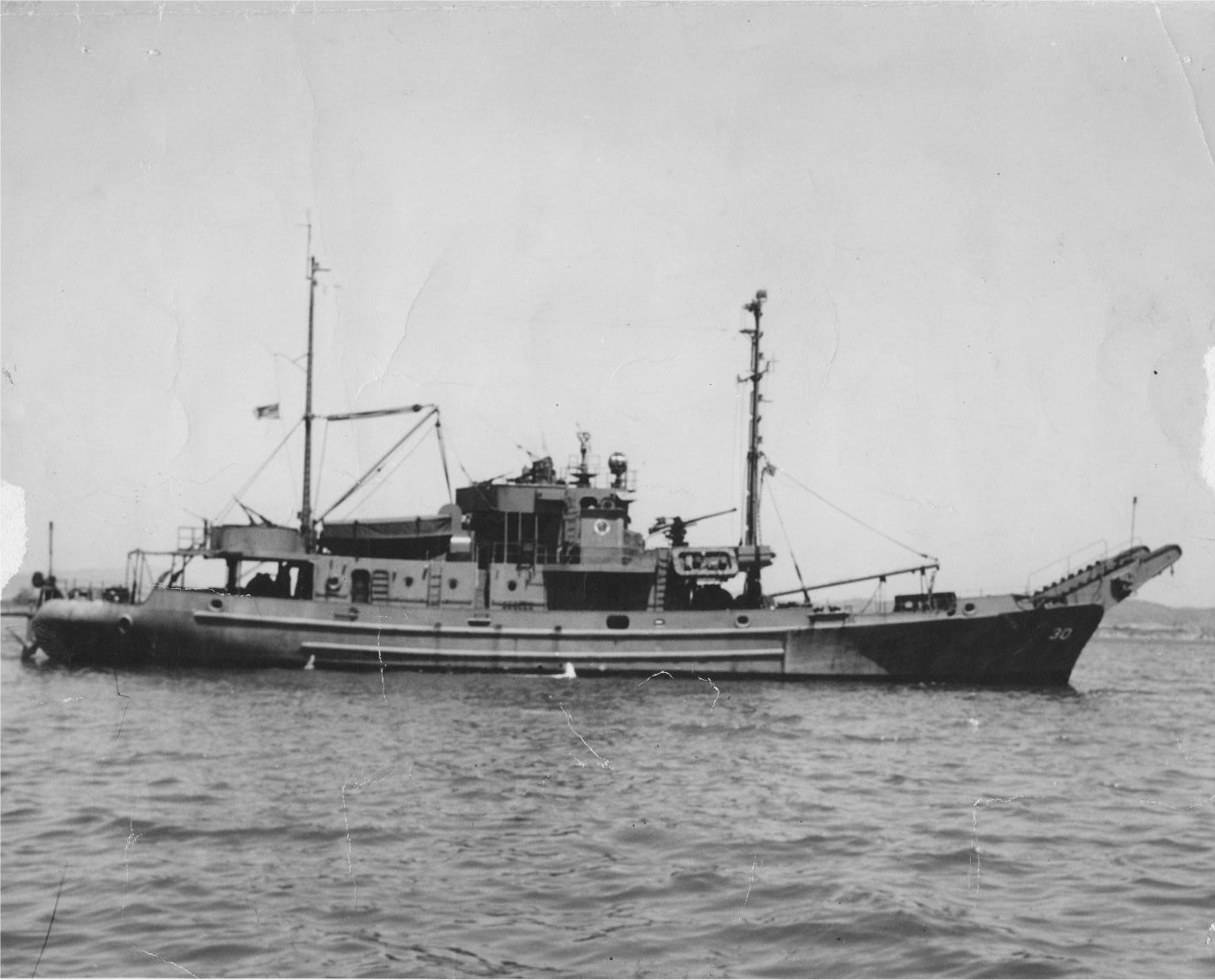
- USS Redwood (AN-30) underway, date and location unknown.

History

United States
- Name: Redwood
- Namesake: Redwood
- Builder: Amship Lorain, Lorain, Ohio
- Yard number: 814
- Laid down: 18 October 1940
- Launched: 22 February 1941
- Commissioned: 12 December 1942
- Decommissioned: 6 June 1947
- Reclassified: 20 January 1944, AN-30
- Identification: Hull symbol: YN-25; Hull symbol: AN-30; Code letters: NWGY
- Fate: Laid up in the Atlantic Reserve Fleet, Green Cove Springs Group, 6 June 1947; Transferred to the Maritime Administration 5 June 1961; Sold for non-transportation use, 21 November 1974, withdrawn from fleet, 8 January 1975

General characteristics
- Class & type: Aloe-class net laying ship
- Displacement: 700 long tons (710 t) (Light load); 805 long tons (818 t) (Full load)
- Length: 162 ft 2 in (49.43 m)
- Beam: 30 ft 6 in (9.30 m)
- Draft: 11 ft 8 in (3.56 m)
- Installed power: 1 × Enterprise DSG-6 Diesel-electric engine; 800 shp (600 kW)
- Propulsion: 1 × Westinghouse Main Reduction Gear; 1 × screw
- Speed: 12 kn (22 km/h; 14 mph)
- Complement: 48 officers and enlisted
- Armament: 1 × 3 in (76 mm) gun mount; 3 × 20 mm (0.79 in) Oerlikon cannons; 1 × Y-gun

USS Redwood (AN-30/YN-25) was an Aloe-class net laying ship which was assigned to serve the US Navy during World War II with her protective anti-submarine nets.

== Construction ==
Redwood was laid down by the Amship Lorain, in Lorain, Ohio, 18 October 1940; launched 22 February 1941; and commissioned 12 December 1942.

== Service history ==
Following shakedown, Redwood steamed south to the British West Indies. Engaged in the installation of torpedo nets at Trinidad, until March 1943, she shifted to Antigua, in April, tending nets there through May. Net maintenance activities at Barbados, St. Thomas, and St. Lucia Islands followed and in mid August, she commenced similar activities at Guantanamo Bay. For the remainder of World War II she tended nets there and at ports on Hispaniola.

Reclassified AN-30, 20 January 1944, Redwood returned to Trinidad in August 1945, and through September, assisted in disposal of nets at sea.

== Decommissioning ==
Redwood then sailed for the US East Coast and, after availability at Charleston Navy Yard, she reported on 24 November 1945, to the Atlantic Reserve Fleet at Green Cove Springs, Florida, where she decommissioned 6 June 1947. On 5 June 1961, she was transferred to the Maritime Administration's (MARAD) National Defense Reserve Fleet, James River Reserve Fleet, Lee Hall.

On 21 November 1974, she was sold for non-transportation use to Boston Metals Co., for $33,666.66. She was removed from the fleet on 8 January 1975.

== Bibliography ==
- "Amship Loain, Lorain, OH". www.ShipbuildingHistory.com. 20 August 2015.
- "USS Redwood (AN-30)". NavSource. 9 September 2016.
- Maritime Administration. "Redwood". Ship History Database Vessel Status Card. U.S. Department of Transportation, Maritime Administration.
- "Redwood". Dictionary of American Naval Fighting Ships. Navy Department, Naval History and Heritage Command. 27 August 2015. This article incorporates text from this source, which is in the public domain.
