= USS Sandalwood =

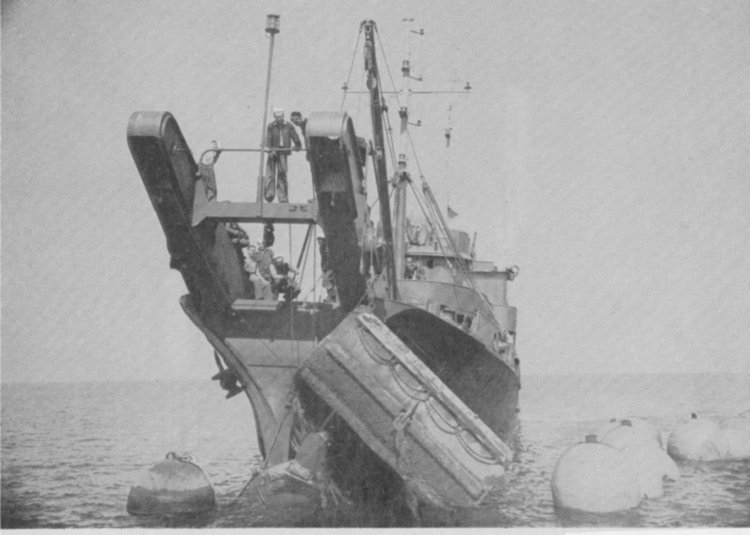
- USS Sandalwood at work

History

United States
- Name: USS Sandalwood (YN-27)
- Namesake: sandalwood tree
- Builder: American Shipbuilding Company, Lorain, Ohio
- Laid down: 18 October 1940
- Launched: 6 March 1941
- Sponsored by: Mrs. J. L. Wallace
- In service: 25 October 1941 as Sandalwood (YN-27)
- Commissioned: date unknown
- Reclassified: AN-32, 20 January 1944
- Decommissioned: 13 August 1946, Portland, Oregon
- Stricken: September 1967
- Fate: transferred to the French Navy, September 1967

History

France
- Name: Luciole
- Acquired: September 1967
- Fate: Sold to Malaysian owners

General characteristics
- Class & type: Aloe-class net laying ship
- Displacement: 560 long tons (570 t), light; 850 long tons (860 t), full
- Length: 163 ft 2 in (49.73 m)
- Beam: 30 ft 6 in (9.30 m)
- Draft: 11 ft 8 in (3.56 m)
- Propulsion: direct drive diesel, single propeller
- Speed: 12.5 knots (23.2 km/h)
- Complement: 48 officers and enlisted
- Armament: 1 × single 3 in (76 mm) gun mount; 3 × 20 mm; 1 × Y-gun

USS Sandalwood (YN-27/AN-32) was an Aloe-class net laying ship built for the United States Navy during World War II. She was later transferred to the French Navy as Luciole. She was stricken from the French Navy and sold to Malaysian owners, but her fate beyond that is unreported in secondary sources.

== Career ==
Sandalwood (YN-27) was laid down on 18 October 1940 by the American Shipbuilding Company, Lorain, Ohio; launched on 6 March 1941; sponsored by Mrs. J. L. Wallace; delivered on 24 October 1941; and placed in service on 25 October 1941.

Following transit of the St. Lawrence River, Sandalwood proceeded down the U.S. East Coast to Norfolk, Virginia, where she remained, conducting net operations and performing occasional patrol or salvage duties, into 1944. Then, redesignated AN-32, effective 22 January, and commissioned on 1 June, she prepared for overseas duty.

On 1 October, Sandalwood was detached from the 5th Naval District. Two weeks later, in the Panama Canal Zone, she reported to CinCPac and continued on to California and Hawaii, arriving at Pearl Harbor on 25 November. She remained in the Hawaiian area into 1945; and, in late February, got underway for the Marshall Islands. At Eniwetok by mid-March, she conducted net operations there through the end of World War II. On 24 November, she steamed east, arrived at San Pedro, California, in early January 1946; and, four months later, moved north to Astoria, Oregon, for inactivation.

Decommissioned on 13 August, Sandalwood was laid up with the Pacific Reserve Fleet, initially at Bremerton, Washington, and later at Stockton, California. In 1962, she was transferred to the National Defense Reserve Fleet at Suisun Bay. Five years later, she was returned to the Navy and sold to the government of France. Transferred in September 1967, she served as Luciole until sold by the French government.
