= USS Holly (AN-19) =

History

United States
- Name: USS Holly
- Namesake: Any of a genus of trees and shrubs having thick, glossy, spiny margined leaves and bright red berries
- Builder: Marietta Manufacturing Co., Point Pleasant, West Virginia
- Laid down: date unknown
- Launched: 17 April 1941
- Commissioned: 15 December 1942 as USS Holly (YN-14) at Boston, Massachusetts
- Decommissioned: 7 June 1946, at Astoria, Oregon
- In service: 11 October 1941 as Holly (YN-14) at Algiers, Louisiana
- Reclassified: AN-19, 20 January 1944
- Stricken: 1 September 1962
- Home port: Tiburon, California
- Honors and awards: one battle star for World War II service
- Fate: Transferred to the National Defense Reserve Fleet, Olympia, Washington; fate unknown

General characteristics
- Type: Aloe-class net laying ship
- Tonnage: 560 tons
- Displacement: 850 tons
- Length: 163 ft 2 in (49.73 m)
- Beam: 30 ft 6 in (9.30 m)
- Draft: 11 ft 8 in (3.56 m)
- Propulsion: Diesel
- Speed: 12.5 knots
- Complement: 40 officers and enlisted
- Armament: one single 3 in (76 mm) gun mount, three 20 mm guns, one y-gun

USS Holly (AN-19/YN-14) was an Aloe-class net laying ship which was assigned to serve the U.S. Navy during World War II with her protective anti-submarine nets.

== Built in West Virginia ==
The second ship to be so named by the Navy, Holly (YN-14) was launched by Marietta Manufacturing Company, Point Pleasant, West Virginia, 17 April 1941; and after the long trip down the Ohio River and the Mississippi River was placed in service at Algiers, Louisiana, 11 October 1941.

== World War II service ==
=== Pacific Ocean operations ===
The net tender spent the first year of her service at various Gulf and East Coast ports servicing harbor nets. She performed this duty at Key West, Florida; Newport, Rhode Island; and, Boston, Massachusetts. Holly commissioned at Boston 15 December 1942.

Holly sailed 24 December 1942 to tend nets in New York Harbor and harbors on the island of Jamaica, en route to the Panama Canal Zone where she arrived 19 January 1943. There she continued servicing net defenses until departing in convoy for Bora Bora 19 February. In the months that followed she steamed between Pago Pago, Suva Harbor, Noumea, and Espiritu Santo, working on vital net facilities which helped keep American bases and staging areas secure. Holly's classification was changed to AN-19, 20 January 1944.

=== Under attack by aircraft ===
In early 1944, the ship joined LST Flotilla 5 in preparation for the invasion of the Mariana Islands. Arriving Kwajalein 6 June 1944, the ship sailed 3 days later with an LST group for the invasion area. During the preinvasion bombardment and reconnaissance 17 June, the fleet came under heavy air attack. Holly's guns assisted in downing several enemy planes; and, when LCI-468 was damaged in the battle, moved swiftly to take her in tow. With the assault well underway, the net tender proceeded to Eniwetok 25 June, arriving 5 days later.

=== End-of-war activity ===
Holly resumed her net servicing duties in the South Pacific Ocean during the remainder of the war, returning to San Pedro, California, soon after the surrender of Japan 15 August 1945. After a short voyage to Pearl Harbor to help dismantle net defenses September–October she arrived Bremerton, Washington, 28 October 1945,

== Post-war decommissioning ==
Holly was decommissioned at Astoria, Oregon, 7 June 1946. Holly remained in the Pacific Reserve Fleet until being stricken 1 September 1962, and transferred to the National Defense Reserve Fleet, Olympia, Washington, under U.S. Maritime Administration custody.

== Honors and awards ==
Holly received one battle star for World War II service.
