= USS Palm =

History

United States
- Name: USS Palm
- Namesake: A tree of the spadiciflorae, palmae class
- Builder: American Shipbuilding Company, Cleveland, Ohio
- Laid down: 18 October 1940 as a yard net tender
- Launched: 1 February 1941
- Commissioned: 1 November 1941 as USS Palm (YN-23)
- Decommissioned: 1 January 1947, at Astoria, Oregon
- Reclassified: AN-28, 20 January 1944
- Stricken: date unknown
- Fate: Transferred 7 September 1962 to the U.S. Maritime Administration; fate unknown

General characteristics
- Type: Aloe-class net laying ship
- Tonnage: 560 tons
- Displacement: 850 tons
- Length: 163 ft 2 in (49.73 m)
- Beam: 30 ft 6 in (9.30 m)
- Draft: 11 ft 8 in (3.56 m)
- Propulsion: direct drive diesel engine, single propeller
- Speed: 12.5 knots
- Complement: 4 officers, 44 enlisted
- Armament: one single 3 in (76 mm) gun mount, three 20 mm guns, one y-gun

USS Palm (AN-28/YN-23) was an Aloe-class net laying ship which was assigned to serve the U.S. Navy during World War II with her protective anti-submarine nets.

== Built in Cleveland, Ohio ==
Palm (AN–28) was laid down as YN–23 at American Shipbuilding Company, Cleveland, Ohio, 18 October 1940; launched February 1941; and commissioned 21 August 1941.

== World War II service ==
Palm served on the Atlantic Ocean terminus of the North Atlantic convoy; in 1943, she operated in and around Argentia and Portland, Maine. Re-designated AN–28 on 20 January 1944, she joined other net tenders in their Pacific Ocean efforts. Palm transported, laid, maintained, and recovered anti-torpedo nets, and maintained buoys in auxiliary tasks that kept the Navy operating.

== Post-war decommissioning ==
After the war, Palm reported to the Columbia River, Oregon. She was out of commission, in reserve there from 1 January 1947 until September 1962, when transferred to the U.S. Maritime Administration, where she entered the National Defense Reserve Fleet at Olympia, Washington.
