= USS Chestnut =

History

United States
- Name: USS Chestnut
- Namesake: A tree of the beech family
- Builder: Commercial Iron Works, Portland, Oregon
- Laid down: as YN-6, date unknown
- Launched: 16 March 1941
- Sponsored by: Mrs. W. E. Meagher
- Commissioned: 24 June 1942 as USS Chestnut (AN-11)
- Decommissioned: 7 September 1946 at Bremerton, Washington
- In service: 26 July 1941 as Chestnut (YN-6)
- Reclassified: AN-11, 24 June 1942
- Stricken: date unknown
- Home port: Tiburon, California
- Fate: Placed out of commission, in reserve 7 September 1946 at Bremerton, Washington; fate unknown

General characteristics
- Type: Aloe-class net laying ship
- Tonnage: 660 tons
- Displacement: 850 tons
- Length: 163 ft 2 in (49.73 m)
- Beam: 30 ft 6 in (9.30 m)
- Draft: 11 ft 8 in (3.56 m)
- Propulsion: diesel engine, single propeller
- Speed: 12 knots
- Complement: 48 officers and enlisted
- Armament: one single 3 in (76 mm) gun mount, three 20 mm guns, four 0.5 in (12.7 mm). machine guns, one y-gun

USS Chestnut (AN-11/YN-6) was an Aloe-class net laying ship which was assigned to serve the U.S. Navy during World War II with her protective anti-submarine nets.

== Built in Portland, Oregon ==
Chestnut (YN-6) was launched 15 March 1941 by Commercial Iron Works, Portland, Oregon; sponsored by Mrs. W. E. Meagher, and placed in service 25 July 1941.

== World War II service ==
Attached to the 11th Naval District, Chestnut tended nets and gave other harbor services at San Diego, California, until 24 June 1942. On 25 May 1942 she was placed in full commission.

Steaming by way of Hawaii and Samoa, Chestnut arrived at Efate, New Hebrides, 26 February 1943. She tended nets there and at Nouméa until 5 December 1943, except for an overhaul at Dunedin, New Zealand. Chestnut arrived in the Solomon Islands 13 December and until 29 August 1944 had cargo, salvage and net repair duty in those islands. She was redesignated AN-11, 20 January 1944.

From 3 September to 10 October 1944 Chestnut dismantled and removed the net line in Havannah Harbor, Efate, and after repairs in Australia, returned to Nouméa until 3 January 1945. Chestnut then moved to Ulithi for net and mooring operations. Except for brief duty at the seaplane base at Kossol Roads, Palau in April, she remained at Ulithi until 19 June when she departed for Guam, arriving two days later.

== Post-war inactivation ==
She had duty there until 14 September when she cleared for the U.S. West Coast, arriving at San Pedro, Los Angeles, 13 October. Chestnut was placed out of commission in reserve 7 September 1946 at Bremerton, Washington.
