= USS Pepperwood =

1941 Aloe-class net laying ship

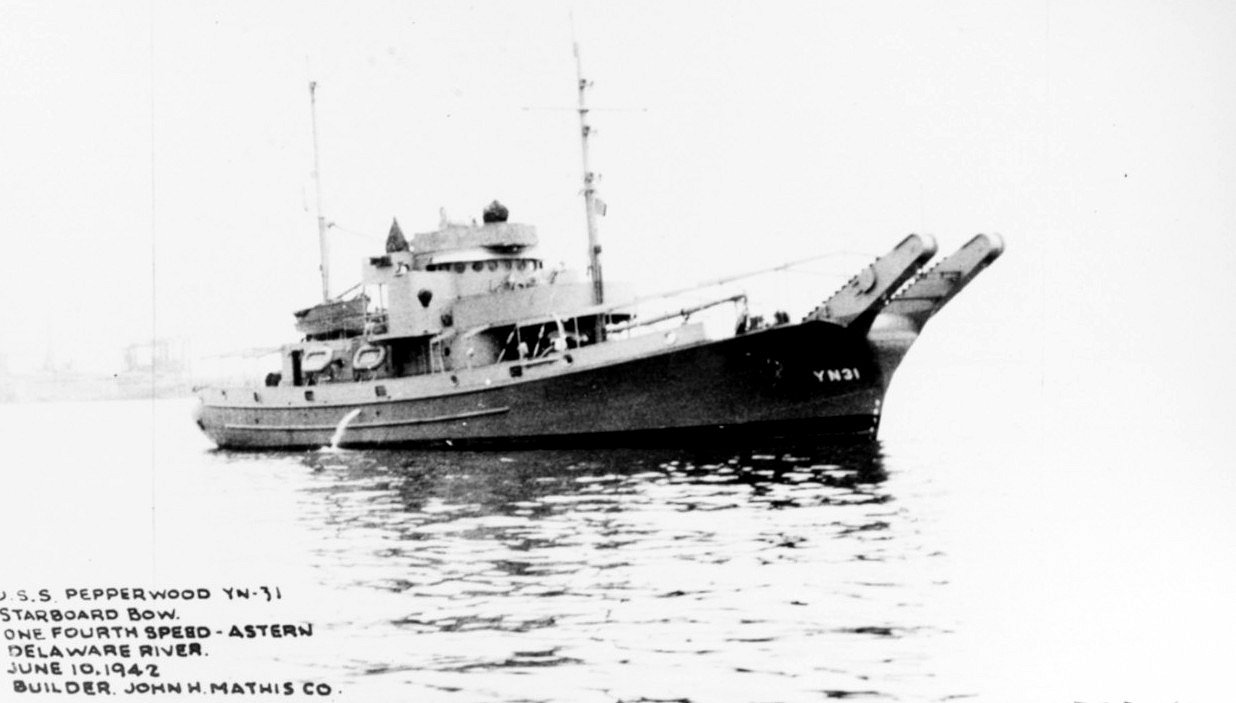
- Pepperwood underway on trials in the Delaware River, 10 June 1942

History

United States
- Name: USS Walnut (YN-31)
- Namesake: Walnut tree
- Builder: John H. Mathis & Company, Camden, New Jersey
- Laid down: 25 October 1940
- Renamed: USS Pepperwood (YN-31)
- Namesake: Pepperwood tree
- Launched: 25 August 1941
- Sponsored by: Mrs. It. E. McShane
- In service: 8 June 1942
- Commissioned: 15 December 1942, Norfolk, Virginia
- Reclassified: AN-36, 30 January 1944
- Decommissioned: 15 December 1944
- Honors and awards: one battle star for World War II service
- Fate: Transferred to the French Navy, 15 December 1944
- Stricken: 28 April 1949

History

France
- Name: Tarentule (A729)
- Acquired: 15 December 1944
- Stricken: 14 April 1972

General characteristics
- Class & type: Aloe-class net laying ship
- Displacement: 560 long tons (570 t), light; 850 long tons (860 t), full
- Length: 163 ft 2 in (49.73 m)
- Beam: 30 ft 6 in (9.30 m)
- Draft: 11 ft 8 in (3.56 m)
- Propulsion: direct drive diesel, single propeller
- Speed: 12.5 knots (23.2 km/h)
- Complement: 48 officers and enlisted
- Armament: 1 × single 3 in (76 mm) gun mount; 2 × 20 mm guns

USS Pepperwood (YN-31/AN-36) was an Aloe-class net laying ship built for the United States Navy during World War II. She was originally ordered and laid down as USS Walnut (YN-31) but renamed before her August 1941 launch. She was later transferred to the French Navy as Tarentule (A729). She was stricken from the French Navy in April 1972, but her fate beyond that is unreported in secondary sources.

== Career ==
Pepperwood (YN–31) was laid down 25 October 1940 by John H. Mathis & Company, Camden, New Jersey; placed in service at Camden 8 June 1942; sponsored by Mrs. It. E. McShane; and commissioned at Norfolk, Virginia, 15 December 1942. Pepperwood reported for duty to Commander, U.S. Atlantic Fleet. She departed Norfolk 28 December 1942 for Morehead City, North Carolina, her station from 1 January to 28 February 1943, when reassigned to Norfolk.

From Norfolk she went via Bermuda and Gibraltar to Oran, Algeria where she arrived 24 April 1943. She placed and serviced anti-submarine nets at Oran and Algiers from 24 April to 31 December 1943. She was reclassified AN–36 on 20 January 1944.

Transferred to the French Navy under Lend Lease 15 December 1944, she was sold to France 21 March 1949. She was struck from the Naval Register 28 April 1949. She served in the French Navy as Tarentule (A–729) until she was struck by the French on 14 April 1972.

Pepperwood received one battle star for World War II service.
