= USS Cinchona =

United States Navy WWII-era net-laying ship

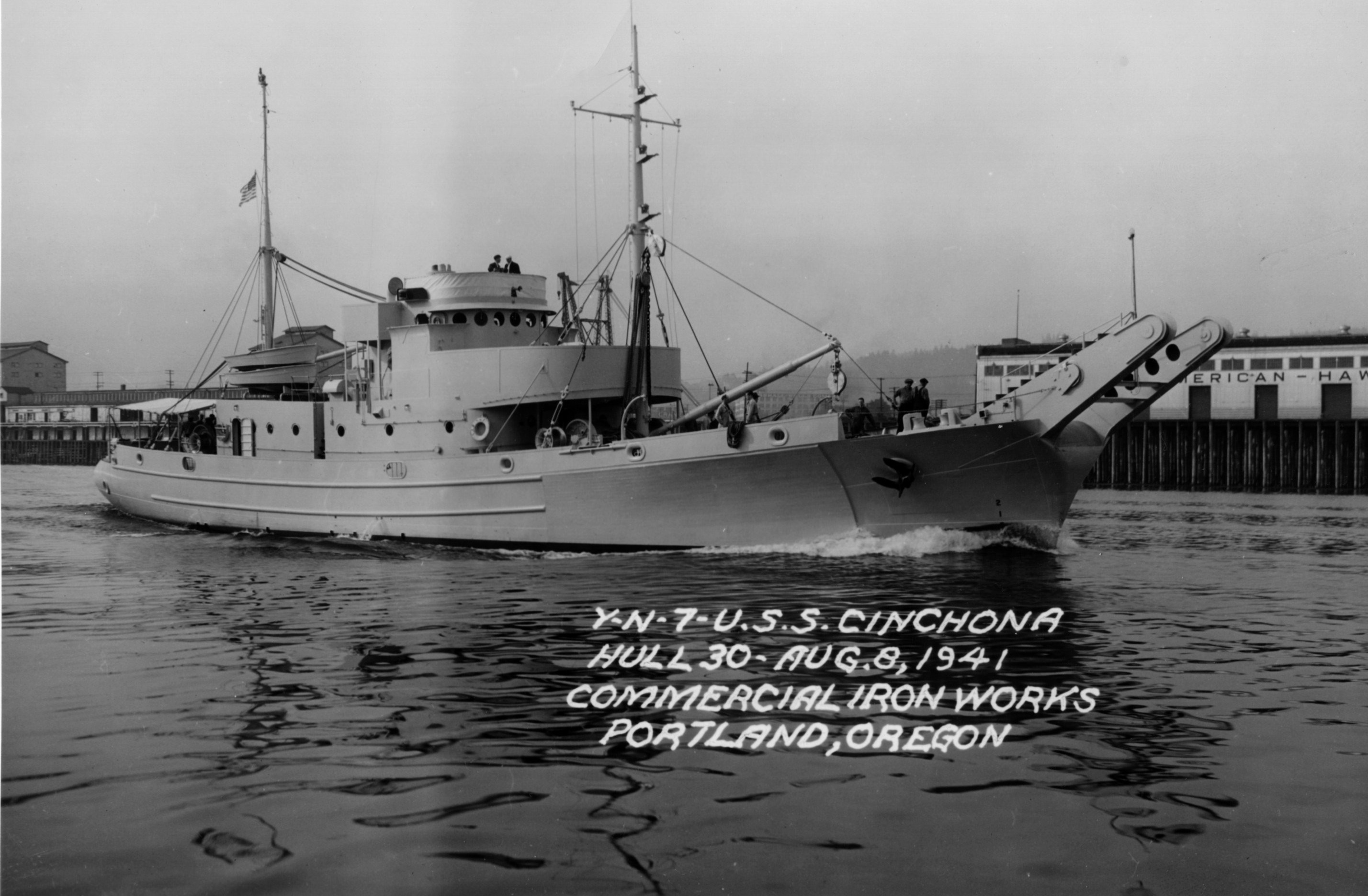
- Cinchona underway near her builders yard during trials, 8 August 1941

History

United States
- Name: USS Cinchona
- Namesake: Various trees the dried bark of which produces quinine
- Builder: Commercial Iron Works, Portland, Oregon
- Laid down: as (YN-7), date unknown
- Launched: 2 July 1941
- Sponsored by: Mrs. W. Casey
- Commissioned: 20 December 1942 as USS Cinchona (YN-7)
- Decommissioned: 6 November 1946, at Vancouver, Washington
- In service: 15 August 1941 as Cinchona (YN-7)
- Reclassified: AN-12, 20 December 1944
- Stricken: Unknown
- Home port: Tiburon, California
- Honors and awards: Two battle stars: under attack on Pearl Harbor, and the Mariana Islands operation
- Fate: Transferred to the U.S. Maritime Administration, 1 June 1961; sold for non-transportation use, 17 February 1976

General characteristics
- Type: Aloe-class net laying ship
- Tonnage: 660 tons
- Displacement: 850 tons
- Length: 163 ft 2 in (49.73 m)
- Beam: 30 ft 6 in (9.30 m)
- Draft: 11 ft 8 in (3.56 m)
- Propulsion: diesel engine, single propeller
- Speed: 12 knots
- Complement: 48 officers and enlisted
- Armament: one single 3 in (76 mm) dual purpose gun mount; three single 20 mm AA gun mounts; four 0.5 in (12.7 mm). machine guns; one y-gun

USS Cinchona (AN-12/YN-7) was an Aloe-class net laying ship which was assigned to serve the U.S. Navy during World War II with her protective anti-submarine nets.

== Built in Portland, Oregon ==
Cinchona (YN-7) was launched on 2 July 1941 by Commercial Iron Works, Portland, Oregon; sponsored by Mrs. W. Casey; outfitted by Puget Sound Navy Yard; and placed in service on 15 August 1941.

== World War II service ==
Assigned to the 14th Naval District, she arrived at Pearl Harbor on 17 October where she took up duty in net repair and replacement, salvage of gear lost or adrift, and maintenance of net and boom defenses.

=== Under attack at Pearl Harbor ===
During the Japanese attack on Pearl Harbor, on 7 December 1941, Cinchona manned both her machine guns and her 3" gun, and, as the enemy repeatedly strafed her deck, she closed the gaps in the net defenses protecting the dry-docks.

Continuing her salvage operations in the Hawaii group, Cinchona salvaged district patrol craft YP-108 off Lanai in June 1942, and in August escorted a motor torpedo boat convoy to Midway Islands, where she installed nets around the dock spaces, returning to Pearl Harbor early in September.

She was placed in commission on 20 December 1942, her officer-in-charge Lieutenant T. A. Ingham receiving the title commanding officer. She continued local operations at Pearl Harbor, and on 20 January 1944 was redesignated AN-12.

=== Saipan operations ===
Cinchona arrived off newly invaded Saipan 16 June 1944. She conducted patrols, assisted LST-84 after an enemy bomb started a fire on board, and then inspected the Japanese net line in Tanapag Harbor. She remained at Saipan on salvage and net operations until 18 November when she steamed to Guam and Ulithi to lay cables.

From 7 December 1944 to 30 June 1945, Cinchona conducted net operations, laid moorings, and aided in installing a pipeline at Guam.

== Post-war activity ==
Returning to the States 27 July, she conducted net operations at Long Beach, California, and out of Mare Island Naval Shipyard until 24 August 1946 when she sailed for Astoria, Oregon.

== Post-war decommissioning ==
Cinchona was placed out of commission in reserve 6 November 1946 at Vancouver, Washington.

== Honors and awards ==
Cinchona received two battle stars for World War II service. The first was for her performance at Pearl Harbor while under attack by Japanese planes. The second was for her operating under dangerous conditions during the Mariana Islands operation.
