= USS Mahogany =

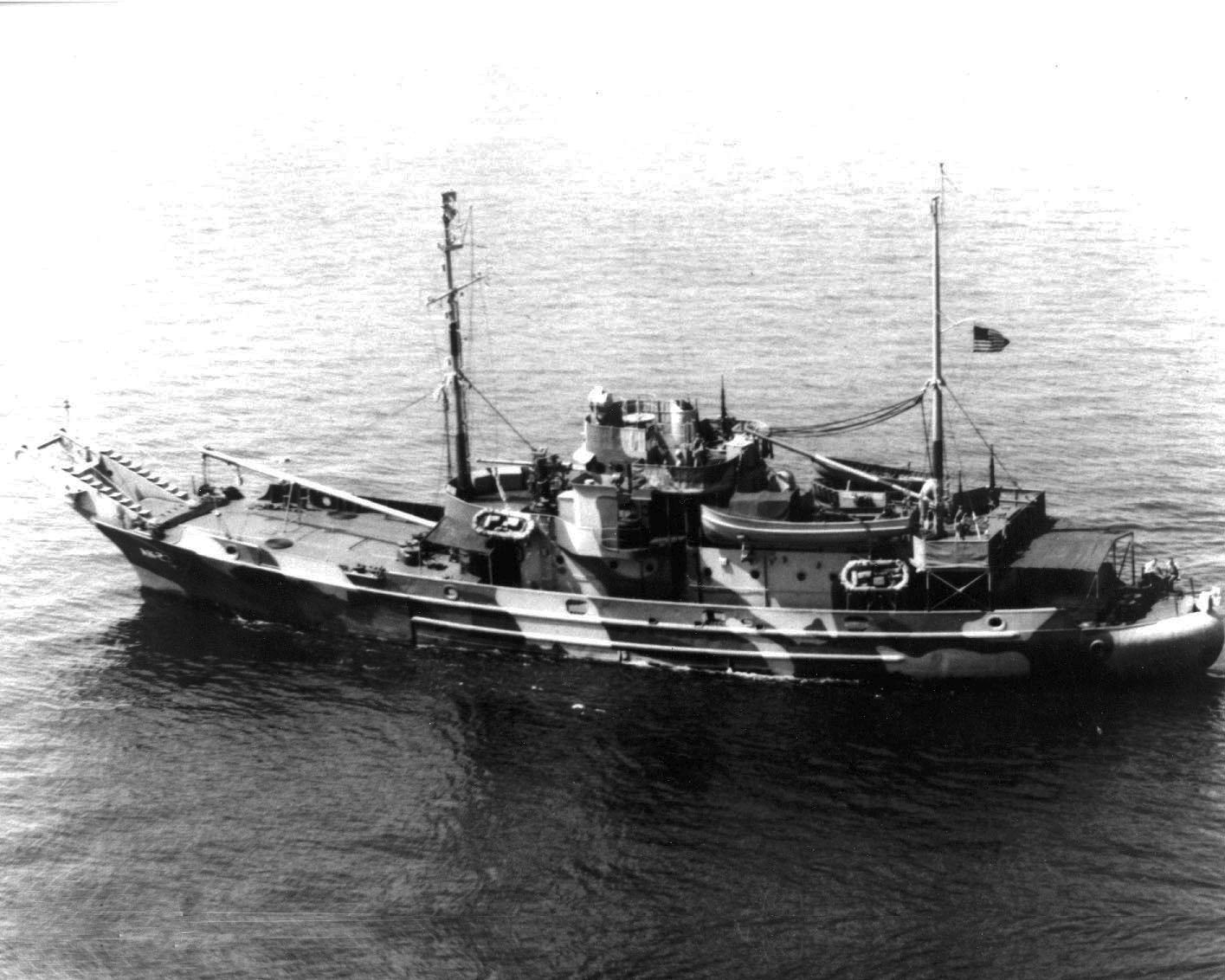
- Mahogany underway in San Pedro Bay, 1 September 1944

History

United States
- Name: USS Mahogany
- Namesake: A tropical hardwood tree
- Builder: American Shipbuilding Company, Cleveland, Ohio
- Laid down: 18 October 1940
- Launched: 18 February 1941
- Commissioned: 22 December 1942 as Mahogany (YN-18)
- Decommissioned: c. 14 September 1945
- Reclassified: AN-23, 20 January 1944
- Stricken: 19 April 1946
- Honors and awards: one battle star for World War II service
- Fate: Severely damaged in Typhoon Ida at Okinawa, 14 September 1945; scrapped.

General characteristics
- Type: Aloe-class net laying ship
- Tonnage: 560 tons
- Displacement: 805 tons
- Length: 163 ft 2 in (49.73 m)
- Beam: 30 ft 6 in (9.30 m)
- Draft: 11 ft 8 in (3.56 m)
- Propulsion: diesel engine, single propeller
- Speed: 12.5 knots
- Complement: 48 officers and enlisted
- Armament: one single 3"/50 dual purpose gun mount; two .50 caliber. machine guns

USS Mahogany (AN-23/YN-18) was an Aloe-class net laying ship which was assigned to serve the U.S. Navy during World War II with her protective anti-submarine nets.

== Built at Cleveland, Ohio ==
Mahogany (YN 18) was laid down 18 October 1940 by the American Shipbuilding Company, Cleveland, Ohio; launched 13 February 1941; and commissioned 22 December 1942.

== World War II service ==
Shortly after commissioning and sea trials, Mahogany reported to Argentia, Newfoundland. There she conducted net tending, rescue, and icebreaking operations through 1943. On 20 January 1944 she was redesignated AN-23.

Four months later, having received additional armament and equipment, she was assigned to the U.S. Pacific Fleet. She completed passage through the Panama Canal 14 July and continued on to San Diego, California, for further exercises. Arriving Pearl Harbor in August, she soon steamed westward; and, from 14 September into March 1945, she laid and tended torpedo nets, moorings and buoys, and participated in various towing, salvage and demolition operations in the central Pacific Ocean.

By April, Mahogany had moved to the western Pacific Ocean for the invasion of Okinawa. She operated with minecraft during the 82 day campaign, 1 April to 21 July, and then remained in the Okinawa Gunto area until after the end of the war.

== Shipwrecked in a typhoon ==
On 14 September 1945 Mahogany. caught in a typhoon, grounded on a reef in Buckner Bay. She was towed to Guam for repairs, but these promised to be so extensive that she was scrapped. After salvageable equipment had been removed, she decommissioned and her hulk was destroyed 19 April 1946 at Guam.

== Honors and awards ==
Mahogany received one battle star for her participation in the Okinawa Gunto operation.
