= USS Nutmeg =

Aloe-class net-laying ship used by the U.S. Navy during World War II

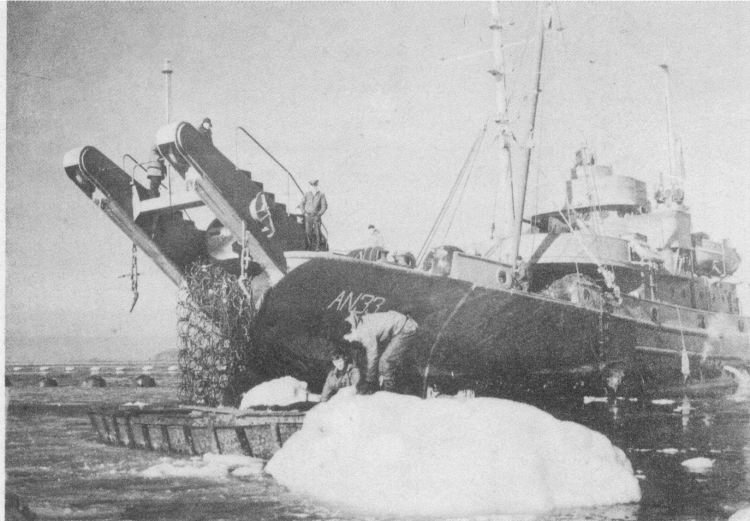

History

United States
- Name: USS Nutmeg
- Namesake: nutmeg
- Ordered: as Sycamore
- Builder: American Shipbuilding Co., Lorain, Ohio
- Laid down: 18 October 1940 as Nutmeg (YN-28)
- Launched: 13 March 1941
- Commissioned: USS Nutmeg (YN-33), date unknown
- Decommissioned: January 1947
- In service: 30 October 1941 as Nutmeg (YN-33)
- Renamed: Nutmeg, 26 June 1940
- Reclassified: AN-33, 20 January 1944
- Stricken: 1 September 1962
- Fate: Sold 8 July 1971; fate unknown

General characteristics
- Class & type: Aloe-class net laying ship
- Tonnage: 560 tons
- Displacement: 805 tons
- Length: 163 ft 2 in (49.73 m)
- Beam: 30 ft 6 in (9.30 m)
- Draft: 11 ft 8 in (3.56 m)
- Propulsion: diesel engine, single propeller
- Speed: 12.5 knots
- Complement: 48 officers and enlisted
- Armament: one single 3 in (76 mm) dual purpose gun mount; two 0.5 in (12.7 mm) machine guns

USS Nutmeg (AN-33/YN-33) was an Aloe-class net laying ship which was assigned to serve the U.S. Navy during World War II with her protective anti-submarine nets.

== Built in Cleveland, Ohio ==
Nutmeg (YN–28), formerly Sycamore, was laid down 18 October 1940 by American Shipbuilding Company, Cleveland, Ohio; launched 13 March 1941; placed in service 30 October. Allocated to the 1st Naval District for net tending duty in the Boston Harbor area she was reclassified AN–33 on 20 June 1944.

== World War II service ==
Through the spring of 1945 Nutmeg was engaged in maintaining and repairing net defenses in Boston Harbor. In May she was attached to Commander Task Force 24 for the purpose of maintaining the anti-torpedo net in Placentia Harbor, Argentia, Newfoundland. She departed Argentia 19 June with Gate Craft (Non-self propelled) YNG–27 in tow, arriving 23 June at South Boston Navy Yard for overhaul and repairs.

Nutmeg had been scheduled for duty at Pearl Harbor when she departed Boston, Massachusetts, 21 July for transit to the U.S. West Coast via Key West, Florida, the Panama Canal Zone, and San Pedro, California.

Voyage repairs and a main engine casualty necessitated a change in schedule, and when World War II ended, Nutmeg was placed on the inactive list and shifted to the Columbia River Reserve Basin.

== Post-war decommissioning ==
Placed out of commission, in reserve in January 1947, she was transferred to the National Defense Reserve Fleet in 1959 and was struck from the Navy List 1 September 1962. She remained in reserve until she was sold 8 July 1971.
