= USS Hackberry =

Aloe-class net laying ship built for the United States Navy during World War II

History

United States
- Name: USS Maple (YN-20)
- Namesake: maple tree
- Builder: American Shipbuilding Company, Cleveland, Ohio
- Laid down: 28 October 1940
- Renamed: USS Hackberry (YN-20), 16 October 1941
- Namesake: hackberry tree
- Launched: 28 October 1941
- Commissioned: 21 December 1942
- Reclassified: AN-25, 20 January 1944
- Decommissioned: 12 November 1944
- Honors and awards: one battle star for World War II service
- Fate: transferred to French Navy, 12 November 1944

History

France
- Name: Araignée (A727)
- Namesake: "Spider"
- Acquired: 12 November 1944
- Decommissioned: 1977
- Fate: Scrapped in 1985

General characteristics
- Class & type: Aloe-class net laying ship
- Displacement: 560 long tons (570 t), light; 850 long tons (860 t), full
- Length: 163 ft 2 in (49.73 m)
- Beam: 30 ft 6 in (9.30 m)
- Draft: 11 ft 8 in (3.56 m)
- Propulsion: direct drive diesel, single propeller
- Speed: 12.5 knots (23.2 km/h)
- Complement: 48 officers and enlisted
- Armament: 1 × single 3 in (76 mm) gun mount; 2 × .30 caliber machine guns; 2 × depth charge tracks

USS Hackberry (YN-20/AN-25) was an Aloe-class net laying ship built for the United States Navy during World War II. She was originally ordered and laid down as USS Maple (YN-20) but renamed shortly before her October 1941 launch. She was later transferred to the French Navy as Araignée (A727).

== Career ==
Hackberry (YN-20), originally Maple but renamed before launching 28 October 1941 by American Shipbuilding Company. Cleveland, Ohio. She was commissioned 21 December 1942.

Following shakedown and training exercises out of Tompkinsville. Rhode Island, the net tender was assigned to North African waters, reporting 12 April 1943. She operated in Palermo harbor towing and acting as cable recovery and salvage vessel. During her stay in Palermo Hackberry installed boom defenses at Catania, Sicily, and operated briefly in the harbor at Naples, Italy.

As the pincers were applied to the Axis in Europe, Hackberry took part in the important landings in southern France. Arriving off the beaches 15 August, the ship helped transport garrison troops from the newly won Alpha beach to Isle du Levant.

Hackberry remained in the area as Allied troops pushed forward from the beachhead, coming under fire from German shore batteries 22 August. With the capture of Toulon, the ship returned to her regular duties, clearing away the net and other harbor obstructions.

Redesignated (AN-25) 20 January 1944, Hackberry operated at Toulon and Marseille until being turned over to the French government under lend-lease 12 November 1944.

Hackberry was returned to U.S. custody from lend-lease 21 March 1949 and was sold the same day to France, where she served as Araignée.

In the summer of 1949, she sailed to Indochina with two small tugs in tow, and in February 1950, she sailed the return trip with Intraitable in tow. From then, she served in Toulon, and in Brest from 1956.

Araignée was decommissioned in 1977, and used as a pontoon hulk until 1985, when she was sold for scrap.
