= USS Rosewood =

1941 Aloe-class net laying ship

History

United States
- Name: USS Rosewood (YN-26)
- Namesake: rosewood tree
- Builder: American Shipbuilding Company, Cleveland, Ohio
- Laid down: 18 October 1940
- Launched: 1 March 1941
- In service: 13 September 1941
- Commissioned: 18 June 1942
- Reclassified: AN-26, 20 January 1944
- Decommissioned: 10 June 1946
- Stricken: date unknown
- Fate: transferred to the French Navy, January 1969

History

France
- Name: Libellule (A730)
- Acquired: January 1969
- Fate: Sunk as a target near Brest, 1983

General characteristics
- Class & type: Aloe-class net laying ship
- Displacement: 560 long tons (570 t), light; 850 long tons (860 t), full
- Length: 163 ft 2 in (49.73 m)
- Beam: 30 ft 6 in (9.30 m)
- Draft: 11 ft 8 in (3.56 m)
- Propulsion: direct drive diesel, single propeller
- Speed: 12.5 knots (23.2 km/h)
- Complement: 48 officers and enlisted
- Armament: 1 × single 3 in (76 mm) gun mount; 2 × 0.5 in (12.7 mm) machine guns; 2 × depth charge tracks

USS Rosewood (YN-26/AN-31) was an Aloe-class net laying ship built for the United States Navy during World War II. She was later transferred to the French Navy as Libellule (A730). She was sunk as a target near Brest in 1983.

== Career ==
Rosewood (YN-26) was laid down 18 October 1940 by the American Ship Building Company, Lorain, Ohio; launched 1 March 1941; and placed in service 13 September 1941.

Following transit of the St. Lawrence River, Rosewood moved down the U.S. East Coast to Norfolk, Virginia, and through the next spring operated as a net tender in the 5th Naval District. Commissioned 18 June 1942, she was ordered to Service Squadron 6 for duty in the Pacific Ocean.

She departed Norfolk 26 July, arrived at Espiritu Santo 19 October, and for over a year tended nets and performed escort duties in the New Hebrides area. During that time, on 20 January 1944, she was redesignated AN-31.

Detached a year later, Rosewood departed Espiritu Santo on 17 January 1945. At Manus at the end of the month, she continued on to the Western Caroline Islands in February, and into June served at Ulithi. Two months duty at Eniwetok followed and on 6 August she sailed for California.

From 1 September to 6 December Rosewood served in the San Pedro, California, area. She then headed north and on 24 December reported for duty in the 13th Naval District. On 17 April 1946 she reported to the Commander, 19th Fleet for inactivation.

Decommissioned 10 June 1946, she remained in the Reserve Fleet for 16 years. In September 1962 she was transferred to the U.S. Maritime Administration for lay-up in the National Defense Reserve Fleet. On 28 October 1968, however, she was returned to the Navy for sale, under the terms of the Military Assistance Program, to France. Delivered to the French Navy in January 1969, she served as Libellule until 21 April 1981 and was sunk as a target, near Brest in 1983.
