= USS Chinquapin =

1941 Aloe-class net laying ship

History

United States
- Name: USS Fir (YN-2)
- Namesake: Fir
- Renamed: USS Chinquapin (YN-11), 16 October 1940
- Namesake: Chinquapin
- Builder: General Engineering & Dry Dock Company, Alameda, California
- Launched: 15 July 1941
- Sponsored by: Mrs. J. Lane
- In service: 29 October 1941
- Commissioned: 6 January 1943
- Reclassified: AN-17, 20 January 1944
- Decommissioned: 6 March 1946 at Astoria, Oregon
- Stricken: 1 September 1962
- Home port: Tiburon, California
- Honors and awards: three battle stars for World War II service
- Fate: Scrapped, 1976

General characteristics
- Class & type: Aloe-class net laying ship
- Tonnage: 560 tons
- Displacement: 700 tons
- Length: 163 ft 2 in (49.73 m)
- Beam: 30 ft 6 in (9.30 m)
- Draft: 11 ft 8 in (3.56 m)
- Propulsion: diesel-electric, single screw
- Speed: 12 knots (22 km/h)
- Complement: 48 officers and enlisted
- Armament: one single 3 in (76 mm) gun mount, three 20 mm guns, one 40 mm gun mount

USS Chinquapin (YN-12/AN-17) was an Aloe-class net laying ship built for the United States Navy during World War II. Originally ordered as USS Fir (YN-2), she was renamed and renumbered to Chinquapin (YN-12) in October 1940 before construction began. She was launched in July 1941, and completed in October 1941. Placed in service at that time without being commissioned, she was commissioned in January 1943, and decommissioned in March 1946. She was placed in reserve at that time and scrapped in 1976.

== Career ==
Chinquapin (YN-12) was initially authorized as Fir (YN-2), but renamed in October 1940 before construction began. She was built by the General Engineering & Dry Dock Company of Alameda, California, and launched on 15 July 1941; sponsored by Mrs. J. Lane; and placed in service 29 October 1941. She was commissioned 6 January 1943. Assigned to the 12th Naval District headquartered at the Mare Island in Vallejo, California, Chinquapin conducted net, salvage, and towing operations out of the Tiburon, California, Net Depot until 31 December 1943 when she sailed for Pearl Harbor, arriving 10 January 1944. On 20 January she was redesignated AN-17.

Chinquapin tended nets and laid moorings at Majuro, Kwajalein, and Eniwetok from 15 February 1944 to 27 July, then supported the Marianas occupation by similar operations at Saipan and Guam until 28 October. Returning via Pearl Harbor to San Francisco, California, as a convoy escort, Chinquapin was overhauled, and on 3 February 1945 sailed via Pearl Harbor and Ulithi for Okinawa, arriving 1 May for net, mooring and transport operations there until 30 October.

Chinquapin returned to Astoria, Oregon, on 11 December and was placed out of commission in reserve 6 March 1946. She was struck from the Naval Vessel Register on 1 September 1962 and placed in the National Defense Reserve Fleet. She was sold for scrapping in 1976.

Chinquapin received three battle stars for World War II service.
