= USS Buckthorn (AN-14) =

History

United States
- Name: USS Dogwood (YN-3)
- Namesake: dogwood
- Renamed: Buckthorn (YN-9), 16 October 1940
- Namesake: Buckthorn
- Builder: General Engineering & Dry Dock Company, Alameda, California
- Laid down: 5 December 1940
- Launched: 27 March 1941
- Sponsored by: Mrs. Rosalie Benton Day
- In service: 16 September 1941, Mare Island Navy Yard
- Commissioned: 9 December 1942
- Reclassified: AN-14, 1 January 1944
- Decommissioned: 20 August 1947, San Diego, California
- Stricken: 1 July 1963
- Fate: Placed in reserve; scrapped in 1976

General characteristics
- Class & type: Aloe-class net laying ship
- Tonnage: 560 tons
- Displacement: 700 tons
- Length: 151 ft 8 in (46.23 m)
- Beam: 30 ft 6 in (9.30 m)
- Draft: 10 ft 6 in (3.20 m)
- Propulsion: diesel electric, single screw
- Speed: 14 knots (26 km/h)
- Complement: 40 officers and enlisted
- Armament: one single 3 in (76 mm) dual purpose gun mount; three 20 mm AA gun mounts; one y-gun

USS Buckthorn (YN-9/AN-14) was an Aloe-class net laying ship built for the United States Navy during World War II. Originally ordered as USS Dogwood (YN-3), she was renamed and renumbered to Buckthorn (YN-9) before construction began in December 1940. She was launched in March 1941, and completed in September 1941. Placed in service at that time without being commissioned, she was commissioned in December 1942, and decommissioned in August 1947. She was placed in reserve in 1947 and scrapped in 1976.

== Career ==
The second ship to be so named by the Navy, Buckthorn (YN-9) was laid down on 5 December 1940 at Alameda, California, by the General Engineering & Drydock Co.; launched on 27 March 1941; sponsored by Mrs. Rosalie Benton Day; and placed in service at the Mare Island Navy Yard on 16 September 1941. That same day, the ship departed the Mare Island Navy Yard. She arrived at San Pedro, California, on the 20th and reported for duty as a unit of the net defenses and inshore patrol. She spent the next 21 months tending nets and conducting patrols at San Pedro. During that time, on 9 December 1942, Buckthorn's status was changed from in service to in commission.

At the end of June 1943, the net tender received orders reassigning her to the 13th Naval District. She departed San Pedro on 14 July 1943 and arrived in Seattle, Washington, on the 21st. On the 22d, the ship entered the Winslow Ship Yards for an overhaul that lasted until 15 August. At that time, Buckthorn began tending nets at Manchester, Washington.

On 3 September 1943, she got underway from Manchester, bound for duty in Alaskan waters. The ship arrived at Dutch Harbor, Alaska, on the 12th and began service with the net defenses there. At the end of the month, she moved to Adak and, by 5 October, had joined the net defenses at Attu.

On 13 October, she participated in what appears to be the only combat action of her career when she fired one round of 3-inch and 120 rounds of 20-millimeter at attacking Japanese bombers. She continued her service at Attu until the spring of 1944. During that time, on 1 January 1944, she was reclassified an auxiliary net tender and redesignated AN-14.

On 24 April 1944, she set sail to join the net defenses at Amchitka Island. Her tour of duty at Amchitka lasted from 25 April to 28 June. On 29 June, Buckthorn returned to Adak for almost three months of service. On 23 September, the net tender shaped a course back to Attu where she remained from 25 September to 24 January 1945. She next tended nets at Adak again between 29 January and 16 April. On the latter day, Buckthorn headed back to Amchitka where she served during the period 17 April to 5 June. On 5 and 6 June, she made the voyage between Amchitka and Adak, spending the following 10 weeks at the latter island.

On 18 August, Buckthorn departed Adak for Dutch Harbor. Between 20 August and 5 September, she underwent her first overhaul at Dutch Harbor. The ship returned to Adak on 7 September and resumed her duties with the net defenses there. Buckthorn continued to serve at various locations in the Aleutians until March 1946.

On 14 March 1946, she arrived in Seattle, Washington, for her second overhaul. The ship entered the Todd Pacific Shipyard on 1 May and emerged again on 16 July. The net tender returned to Alaskan waters at Kodiak on 27 July. She resumed her former duties at the several familiar Aleutian locations until late April 1947. On 23 April, Buckthorn received orders heralding her inactivation.

After a leisurely voyage that included lengthy stops at Dutch Harbor, Kodiak, and Seattle, the net tender arrived in San Diego, California, at the end of the first week in August.

On 20 August 1947, Buckthorn was decommissioned and berthed with the San Diego Group, Pacific Reserve Fleet. Her name was struck from the Navy List on 1 July 1963, and she was transferred to the U.S. Maritime Administration to be berthed with the Suisun Bay facility of its National Defense Reserve Fleet. She was scrapped in 1976.
