= USS Saugus (LSV-4) =

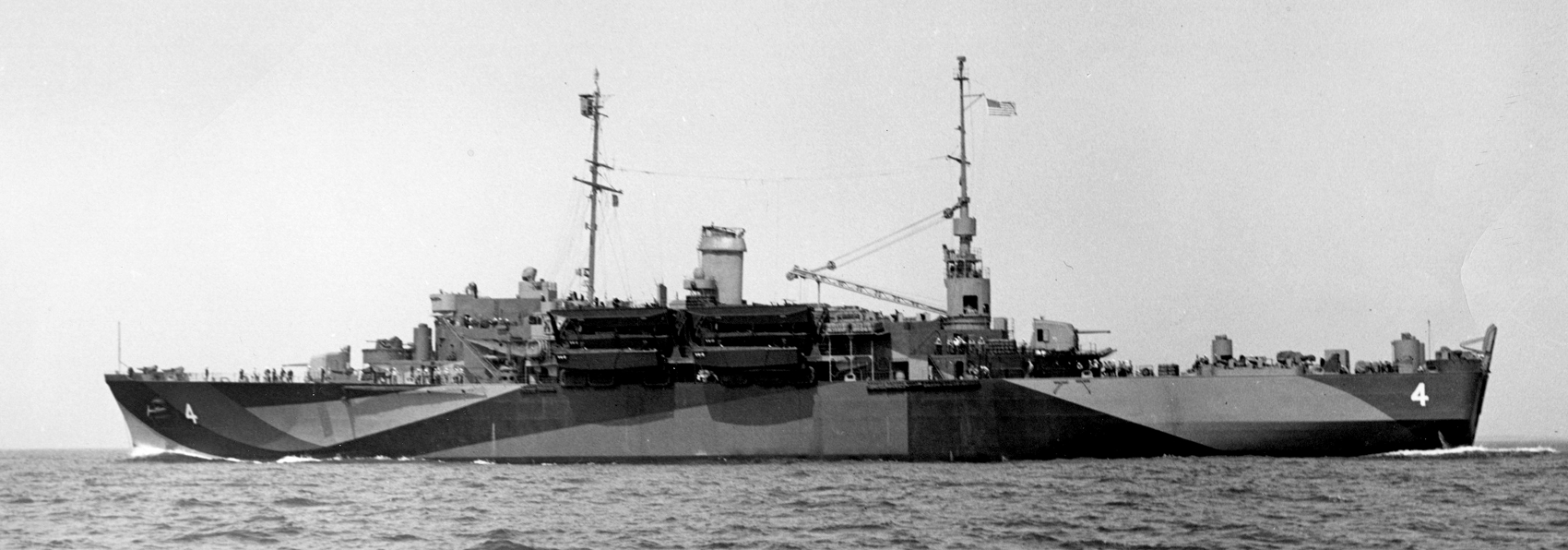
- USS Saugus (LSV-4)

History

United States
- Name: USS Saugus
- Builder: Ingalls Shipbuilding, Pascagoula, Mississippi
- Laid down: 27 July 1942, as AN-4 (Net laying ship)
- Launched: 4 September 1943
- Commissioned: 22 February 1945
- Decommissioned: 24 March 1947
- Reclassified: AP-109 (Transport), 1 May 1943; LSV-4 (Landing Ship Vehicle), 21 April 1944; MCS-4 (Mine Countermeasures Support Ship), 18 October 1956
- Stricken: 1 July 1961
- Fate: Sold for scrapping, 13 July 1976

General characteristics
- Class & type: Osage-class vehicle landing ship
- Displacement: 4,626 long tons (4,700 t) light; 9,040 long tons (9,185 t) full
- Length: 458 ft (140 m)
- Beam: 60 ft 2 in (18.34 m)
- Draft: 20 ft (6.1 m)
- Propulsion: 4 × Combustion Engineering 2-drum boilers; 2 × General Electric geared turbines; 2 shafts
- Speed: 21 knots (39 km/h; 24 mph)
- Capacity: 19 × LVTs or 29 DUKWs
- Troops: 122 officers, 1236 enlisted men
- Complement: 458 officers and enlisted men
- Armament: 2 × single 5"/38 caliber gun mounts (forward); 1 × twin 5"/38 caliber gun mount (aft); 4 × twin 40 mm guns; 20 × single 20 mm guns

USS Saugus (AN-4/AP-109/LSV-4/MCS-4) was an Osage-class vehicle landing ship built for the United States Navy during World War II. Named after USS Saugus (1863), which was in turn named for Saugus, Massachusetts, she was the second of three U.S. Naval vessels to bear the name.

Laid down on 27 July 1942 by the Ingalls Shipbuilding Corporation of Pascagoula, Mississippi as netlayer AN-4; reclassified AP-109 on 1 May 1943; launched on 4 September 1943; sponsored by Mrs. Rivers J. Carstarphen; reclassified LSV-4 on 21 April 1944; completed by the Tampa Shipbuilding Company of Tampa, Florida; and commissioned on 22 February 1945.

== Service history ==
After shakedown, Saugus loaded cargo at New Orleans and sailed on 30 March 1945 for Hawaii. En route, she spent 10 days at Balboa, Canal Zone, for turbine repairs and arrived at Pearl Harbor on 27 April. Between 4 May and 15 August, she made five round trips between the west coast and Hawaii with passengers and cargo. On 1 September she sailed from Pearl Harbor with occupation troops for Japan, arriving at Sasebo on 22 September. She then made one voyage to Manila; returned to Sasebo; and reported for "Operation Magic Carpet" duty on 20 October. After making two voyages returning troops home from the Philippines, the ship was released from "Magic Carpet" duty in December 1945 and arrived at San Diego for inactivation on 8 February 1946.

Saugus was decommissioned on 24 March 1947 but remained "in service, in reserve" until 17 October 1947. Her designation was changed to MCS-4 on 18 October 1956, in anticipation of a conversion under project SCB 123. She was struck from the Naval Vessel Register on 1 July 1961 and transferred to the Maritime Administration's reserve fleet at Suisun Bay, California on 1 October 1962. She was sold for scrapping to the National Metal and Steel Corporation on 13 July 1976.

== See also ==
- Net laying ship § 1930s
