= USS Ash =

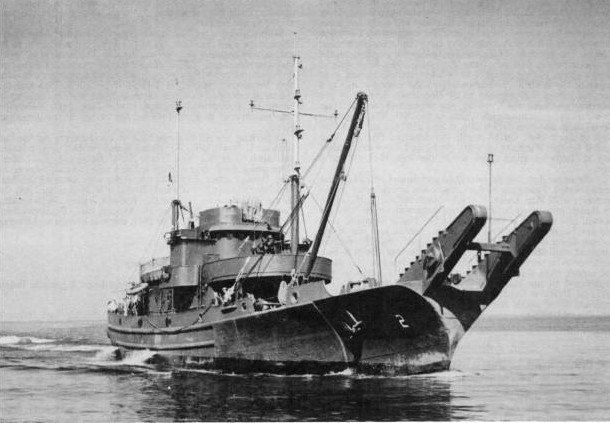
- Ash (YN-2) underway c. 1941, in Measure 1 camouflage—dark gray with light gray mast tops. Note the specially designed lifting "horns" forward, as well as the heavy boom at the foremast.

History

United States
- Name: USS Ash
- Namesake: A genus of trees of the olive family characterized by pinnate leaves; gray branchlets; and thin, furrowed bark
- Builder: Lake Washington Shipyards, Houghton, Washington
- Laid down: as YN-2, date unknown
- Launched: 15 February 1941
- Commissioned: 20 December 1942 as USS Ash (AN-7)
- Decommissioned: 13 December 1946, at Vancouver, Washington
- In service: 1 July 1941 as Ash (YN-2)
- Reclassified: AN-7, 20 December 1942
- Stricken: 1 September 1962
- Home port: Tiburon, California
- Fate: Sold for scrapping, 14 May 1971

General characteristics
- Type: Aloe-class net laying ship
- Tonnage: 560 long tons (569 t)
- Displacement: 700 long tons (711 t)
- Length: 162 ft 2 in (49.4 m)
- Beam: 30 ft 6 in (9.3 m)
- Draft: 11 ft 8 in (3.6 m)
- Installed power: 800 shp (597 kW)
- Propulsion: 2 × Diesel-driven 60 kW 120 V ship service generators; 1 × Enterprise DSG-6 diesel engine; 1 × Westinghouse main reduction gear; 1 × Screw propeller; 98,572 L (21,682.8 imp gal; 26,040.0 US gal) of fuel oil
- Speed: 12.5 kn (23.2 km/h; 14.4 mph)
- Complement: 4 officers; 44 enlisted
- Armament: 1 × (76.2 mm) 3”/50 cal gun; 2 × (12.7 mm) 0.50 cal M2 machine guns; 1 × Y-gun depth charge thrower

USS Ash (AN-7/YN-2) was an Aloe-class net laying ship which was assigned to serve U.S. Navy ships and harbors during World War II with her protective anti-submarine nets.

== Career ==
Ash (YN-2) was launched on 15 February 1941 at Houghton, Washington, by the Lake Washington Shipyards, Inc., and was placed in service on 1 July 1941. The net layer served briefly in San Francisco Bay laying out net buoys and tending nets until 20 August when she headed for the Hawaiian Islands and duty in the 14th Naval District.

Ash arrived at the section base at Bishop's Point on the island of Oahu on 28 August and began working on the nets that protected Pearl Harbor. She was at the Bishop's Point section base when the Japanese attacked American warships and installations at Pearl Harbor on the morning of 7 December 1941. Though she fired sporadically at some of the enemy planes during the two hours of the attack, she claimed no kills and suffered neither casualties nor damage. Following the attack, the ship served at Pearl Harbor through the end of the war. Redesignated AN-7 on 20 December 1942, she was placed in full commission that same day.

Ash continued to operate in the Pearl Harbor area until 11 May 1946, when she got underway for San Francisco, California. The net layer was moored at the Mare Island Naval Shipyard until 1 November when she got underway for Vancouver, Washington. She was placed out of commission there on 13 December 1946, and remained in reserve until 1 September 1962, when her name was struck from the Naval Vessel Register. She was then transferred to the U.S. Maritime Administration for lay up with the National Defense Reserve Fleet at Olympia, Washington. She stayed there until sold on 14 May 1971 to I. D. Logan for scrapping.
