= USS Buckeye =

1941 Aloe-class net laying ship

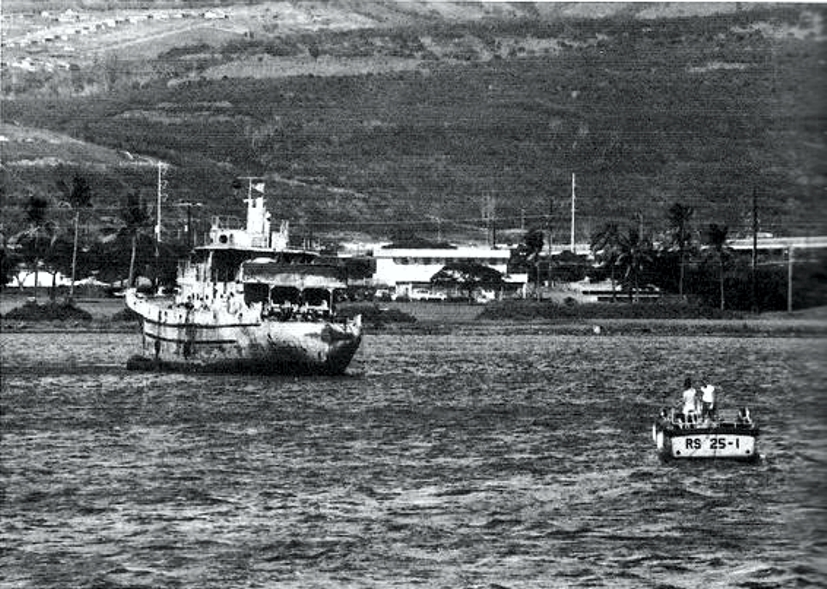
- Buckeye as a salvage training hulk, in 1979

History

United States
- Name: USS Buckeye
- Namesake: A tree resembling the horse chestnut
- Ordered: as Cottonwood (YN-8)
- Builder: Commercial Iron Works, Portland, Oregon
- Laid down: 17 March 1941, as Buckeye (YN-8)
- Launched: 26 July 1941
- Sponsored by: Miss Sara Ann Tefler
- Commissioned: 26 December 1942 as USS Buckeye (YN-8) at Dutch Harbor, Alaska
- Decommissioned: March 1947 at Subic Bay, Philippine Islands
- In service: 5 September 1941
- Renamed: Buckeye, 16 October 1940
- Reclassified: AN-13, 1 January 1944
- Stricken: 1 July 1963
- Home port: Tiburon, California
- Fate: Transferred in 1963 to the U.S. Maritime Administration's National Defense Reserve Fleet, Suisun Bay, Benicia, California
- Notes: Reacquired by the Navy,5 May 1976, for use as a salvage training hulk

General characteristics
- Type: Aloe-class net laying ship
- Tonnage: 660 tons
- Displacement: 700 tons
- Length: 163 ft 2 in (49.73 m)
- Beam: 30 ft 6 in (9.30 m)
- Draft: 11 ft 8 in (3.56 m)
- Propulsion: diesel engine, single propeller
- Speed: 12.5 knots
- Complement: 48 officers and enlisted
- Armament: one single 3 in (76 mm) dual purpose gun mount; two 0.5 in (12.7 mm). machine guns

USS Buckeye (AN-13/YN-8) was an Aloe-class net laying ship in service with the United States Navy from 1942 to 1947. In the late 1970s and 1980s, she was used as a salvage training hulk.

== Built in Portland, Oregon ==
Buckeye (YN-8) was laid down on 17 March 1941 at Portland, Oregon, by the Commercial Iron Works; launched on 26 July 1941; sponsored by Miss Sara Ann Tefler; and placed in service on 5 September 1941.

== World War II service ==
=== North Pacific operations ===
After fitting out at the Puget Sound Navy Yard, Buckeye began duty in the 13th Naval District. She tended nets there until the fall of 1942. At that time, the ship was transferred to the Alaska Sector based at Dutch Harbor.

While stationed there, she was placed in full commission on 26 December 1942. She continued to tend nets and buoys in the Aleutian Islands, first at Dutch Harbor and, after May 1943, at recently captured Attu. On 1 January 1944, Buckeye was re-designated AN 13. During the summer of 1944, the net layer received orders to Seattle, Washington, for an overhaul that she completed between 24 July and 11 September.

=== West Pacific operations ===
Following a round-trip voyage from the U.S. West Coast to Hawaii and back, Buckeye was stationed at the Naval Net Depot at Tiburon, California, near San Francisco, California, as ready duty ship and standby vessel for emergency repairs. That duty lasted until 27 January 1945 when she was transferred to Service Squadron (ServRon) 6 of the U.S. 7th Fleet.

During February and March, the net layer stopped at Pearl Harbor, Funafuti in the Ellice Islands, Manus in the Admiralty Islands, and Hollandia on New Guinea before arriving in the Philippines in April. Initially, she served in Leyte Gulf but, later that summer moved to Luzon where she operated in Manila Bay and Subic Bay.

== Post-war activity ==
Buckeye spent the remainder of her active career at Luzon. On 17 July 1946, the ship went aground in Subic Bay. With the assistance of Elder, she was refloated on 29 July and was towed to Alava Dock for repairs.

== Post-war inactivation ==
She was still undergoing repairs at the end of 1946 and, apparently, they were never completed. She went out of commission at Subic on 4 March 1947. Later transferred to the Pacific Reserve Fleet group berthed at San Diego, California, she remained there until 1963 when she was turned over to the U.S. Maritime Administration for lay up in Suisun Bay, California

Her name was struck from the Navy List on 1 July 1963. She remained at the Suisun Bay facility until 5 May 1976 at which time she was reacquired by the Navy for use as a salvage training hulk. Her status is unknown.
