= Aloe-class net laying ship =

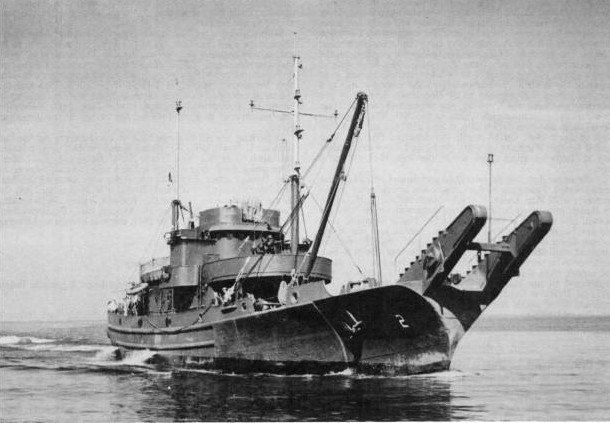
- USS Ash showing unique bow appliances of this class

Class overview
- Name: Aloe class
- Builders: (6 companies in 6 states)
- Operators: United States Navy; Ecuadorian Navy; French Navy; Turkish Navy
- Succeeded by: Ailanthus class
- Completed: 32

General characteristics
- Type: net laying ship
- Propulsion: diesel-electric, single reduction gears, 1 shaft, 800hp
- Armament: 1 × 3in/50

The Aloe-class net laying ships were a class of thirty-two steel-hulled net laying ships built prior to the US entry into World War II. The lead ship, USS Aloe, was laid down in October 1940 and launched the following January; the final member, USS Yew, was launched in October 1941. They were assigned tree and plant names in alphabetical order, but eight ships (in order Cottonwood, Dogwood, Fir, Juniper, Maple, Poplar, Sycamore, and Walnut) were renamed prior to launching, producing discontinuities in the name order. These ships were originally classed as YN and numbered 1-32, but were reclassified and renumbered in 1944 as AN-6 through AN-37.

These ships had a unique appearance with a pair of "horns" jutting out from either side of the bow, each functioning as a fixed crane with a capacity of 22 short tons (20 t). They were powered by a pair of diesel engines which provided electricity for both propulsion and lifting machinery; there were also two auxiliary diesels and an evaporator for fresh water. Between the "horns" was an opening through which nets could be hauled, bridged by a catwalk.

- two 700hp Enterprise diesels, Westinghouse reduction gears driving 2 WH generators, one WH motor
  - AN-6 ... AN-17
- General Motors 6-278, Farrel-Birmingham gears
  - AN-22 ... AN-33
- uncertain
  - AN-34 ... AN-37

All members of this class survived the war though USS Mahogany was caught in a typhoon in September 1945 and decommissioned the following year. Three ships were transferred to the French Navy in 1944 and another three were so transferred in the 1960s; two others went to the Turkish and Ecuadorian navies respectively. Three others were retained for various purposes, while the remainder were put into the reserve fleet shortly after the war.

== Class members ==
Name	Hull	Orig	Builder	Launched	Decomm.	Fate
Aloe	AN-6	YN-1	Lake Washington Shipyards, WA	11 Jan 1941	3 Aug 1946	sold for scrap
Ash	AN-7	YN-2	Lake Washington Shipyards, WA	15 Feb 1941	13 Dec 1946	sold for scrap
Boxwood	AN-8	YN-3	Lake Washington Shipyards, WA	8 Mar 1941	13 Nov 1946	reserve fleet; fate uncertain
Butternut	AN-9	YN-4	Lake Washington Shipyards, WA	10 May 1941	18 Jul 1969	used for test range support 1957–69; reclassed YAG-60 1969; sunk as target
Catalpa	AN-10	YN-5	Commercial Iron Works, OR	22 Feb 1941	21 Oct 1946/ 7 Oct 1955	unknown
Chestnut	AN-11	YN-6	Commercial Iron Works, OR	16 Mar 1941	7 Sep 1946	reserve fleet; fate uncertain
Cinchona	AN-12	YN-7	Commercial Iron Works, OR	2 Jul 1941	6 Nov 1946	reserve fleet; fate uncertain
Buckeye	AN-13	YN-8	Commercial Iron Works, OR	26 Jul 1941	Mar 1947	reserve fleet; fate uncertain
Buckthorn	AN-14	YN-9	General Engineering & Dry Dock Company, CA	27 Mar 1941	20 Aug 1947	reserve fleet; scrapped 1976
Ebony	AN-15	YN-10	General Engineering & Dry Dock Company, CA	3 Jun 1941	23 Mar 1946	reserve fleet; scrapped 1976
Eucalyptus	AN-16	YN-11	General Engineering & Dry Dock Company, CA	3 Jul 1941	6 Mar 1946	reserve fleet; scrapped 1976
Chinquapin	AN-17	YN-12	General Engineering & Dry Dock Company, CA	15 Jul 1941	6 Mar 1946	reserve fleet; scrapped 1976
Gum Tree	AN-18	YN-13	Marietta Manufacturing Co., WV	20 Mar 1941	20 Jun 1946	reserve fleet; fate uncertain
Holly	AN-19	YN-14	Marietta Manufacturing Co., WV	17 Apr 1941	7 Jun 1946	reserve fleet; fate uncertain
Elder	AN-20	YN-15	Marietta Manufacturing Co., WV	19 Jun 1941	18 Dec 1959	unknown
Larch	AN-21	YN-16	Marietta Manufacturing Co., WV	2 Jul 1941	28 Jun 1946	transferred to Turkish Navy 1948
Locust	AN-22	YN-17	American Ship Building Company, Cleveland, OH	1 Feb 1941	8 Jul 1946	transferred to French Navy; sank July 1978
Mahogany	AN-23	YN-18	American Ship Building Company, Cleveland, OH	18 Feb 1941	Sep 1945	damaged in Typhoon Ida; scrapped
Mango	AN-24	YN-19	American Ship Building Company, Cleveland, OH	22 Feb 1941	4 Apr 1947	reserve fleet; fate uncertain
Hackberry	AN-25	YN-20	American Ship Building Company, Cleveland, OH	28 Oct 1941	12 Nov 1944	transferred to French Navy as Araignée (A727); scrapped 1985
Mimosa	AN-26	YN-21	American Ship Building Company, Cleveland, OH	15 Mar 1941	27 Dec 1946	reserve fleet; fate uncertain
Mulberry	AN-27	YN-22	American Ship Building Company, Cleveland, OH	26 Mar 1941	11 Apr 1960	transferred to Ecuadorian Navy 1965; scrapped 1980
Palm	AN-28	YN-23	American Ship Building Company, Lorain, OH	1 Feb 1941	1 Jan 1947	reserve fleet; fate uncertain
Hazel	AN-29	YN-24	American Ship Building Company, Lorain, OH	15 Feb 1941	11 Feb 1958	reserve fleet; struck 1962
Redwood	AN-30	YN-25	American Ship Building Company, Lorain, OH	22 Feb 1941	6 Jun 1947	reserve fleet; fate uncertain
Rosewood	AN-31	YN-26	American Ship Building Company, Lorain, OH	1 Mar 1941	10 Jun 1946	reserve fleet; transferred to French Navy 1969; sunk as target 1983
Sandalwood	AN-32	YN-27	American Ship Building Company, Lorain, OH	6 Mar 1941	13 Aug 1946	reserve fleet; transferred to French Navy 1967; sold, fate unknown
Nutmeg	AN-33	YN-28	American Ship Building Company, Lorain, OH	13 Mar 1941	Jan 1947	reserve fleet; sold 1971; fate unknown
Teaberry	AN-34	YN-29	John H. Mathis & Company, NJ	24 May 1941	14 Dec 1946/ 7 July 1961	recommissioned 19 April 1953 for auxiliary service; sold 1962 for scrapping
Teak	AN-35	YN-30	John H. Mathis & Company, NJ	7 Jul 1941	30 Aug 1946	reserve fleet; sold for scrap 1976
Pepperwood	AN-36	YN-31	John H. Mathis & Company, NJ	25 Aug 1941	15 Dec 1944	transferred to French Navy; struck 1972
Yew	AN-37	YN-32	John H. Mathis & Company, NJ	4 Oct 1941	1 Jan 1944	transferred to French Navy; sank 1978
