= USS Eucalyptus =

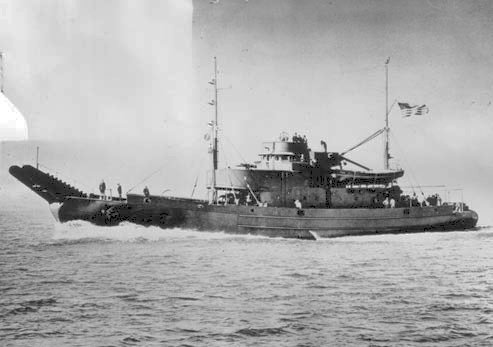

History

United States
- Name: USS Eucalyptus (YN-11)
- Namesake: Eucalyptus
- Builder: General Engineering & Dry Dock Company, Alameda, California
- Launched: 3 July 1941
- Sponsored by: Mrs. Romana Jorgenson
- In service: 9 October 1941
- Commissioned: 9 May 1942
- Reclassified: AN-16, 20 January 1944
- Decommissioned: 6 March 1946, Astoria, Oregon
- Stricken: 1 September 1962
- Fate: Placed in reserve; scrapped, 1976

General characteristics
- Class & type: Aloe-class net laying ship
- Tonnage: 560 tons
- Displacement: 850 tons
- Length: 163 ft 2 in (49.73 m)
- Beam: 30 ft 6 in (9.30 m)
- Draft: 11 ft 8 in (3.56 m)
- Propulsion: diesel engine, single propeller
- Speed: 12.5 knots (23.2 km/h)
- Complement: 40 officers and enlisted
- Armament: one single 3 in (76 mm) gun mount, two 20 mm guns

USS Eucalyptus (YN-11/AN-16) was an Aloe-class net laying ship built for the United States Navy during World War II. She was launched in July 1941, and completed in October 1941. Placed in service at that time without being commissioned, she was commissioned in May 1942, and decommissioned in 1946. She was placed in reserve and later scrapped in 1976.

== Career ==
Eucalyptus (YN-11) was launched on 3 July 1941 by General Engineering and Dry Dock Company, Alameda, California; sponsored by Mrs. Romana Jorgenson and placed in service in a noncommissioned status on 9 October 1941, Lieutenant S. B. McDonald, USNR, officer-in-charge. She was commissioned on 9 May 1942 and reclassified AN-16 on 20 January 1944. Initially assigned to the 13th Naval District, Eucalyptus carried out patrol and net-tending operations there until late 1943 when she sailed to Alaskan waters for more of the same duty.

She returned to Seattle, Washington, in July 1944, then was reassigned to duty in the San Francisco Bay area for the duration of World War II. In November 1945 she sailed to Astoria, Oregon, where on 6 March 1946, she was placed in commission in reserve. Eucalyptus was placed out of commission in November 1946 at Astoria, Oregon, and remained in reserve through 1961. She was stricken and transferred to the United States U.S. Maritime Administration (MARAD) on 1 September 1962. She was sold for scrapping in 1976.
