= Net laying ship =

Ship type built to lay and maintain steel anti-torpedo or anti-submarine nets

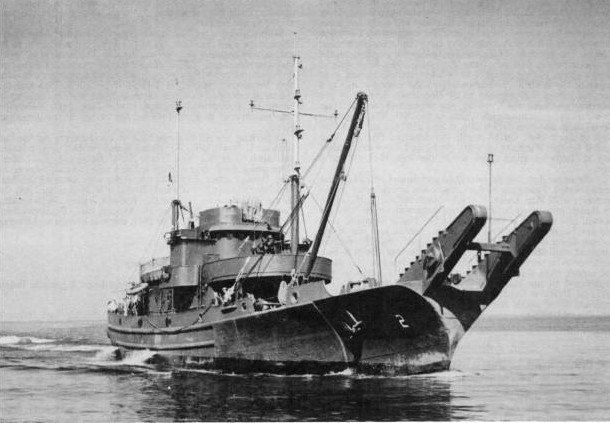
USS Ash, an American net laying ship that worked at Pearl Harbor in the 1940s

A net laying ship, also known as a net layer, net tender, gate ship or boom defence vessel was a type of naval auxiliary ship.

A net layer's primary function was to lay and maintain steel anti-submarine nets or anti torpedo nets. Nets could be laid around an individual ship at anchor, or harbor entrances or dry docks, or other anchorages. Net laying was potentially dangerous work, and net laying seamen were experts at dealing with blocks, tackles, knots and splicing. As World War II progressed, net layers were pressed into a variety of additional roles including salvage, troop and cargo transport, buoy maintenance, and service as tugboats. Many of the ships were decommissioned after the war, but some continued in service for several more decades.

Net layers were eventually made redundant by advances in underwater detection technology.

== US Navy ==
=== 1930s ===
War Plan Orange, the pre-World War II US plan for war with Japan, anticipated that Pearl Harbor would be too small for the US Navy fleet that would be amassed in Hawaii. Orange anticipated the construction of a large anchorage in Lahaina Roads between the islands of Maui, Lānaʻi, and Molokaʻi. Construction would consist of massive nets and minefields to protect the anchored ships.

==== Changing requirements ====
Ultimately four large netlayers would be laid down just before and after the attack on Pearl Harbor: USS Monitor, USS Montauk, USS Osage, and USS Saugus. (Note: These ships were of a common design with three fleet minelayers: USS Terror, USS Catskill, and USS Ozark which are listed here) It turned out that these ships were not needed. First, dredging significantly enlarged the anchorages in Pearl Harbor. Second, the mobility of aircraft carrier warfare made the large Lahaina Roads anchorage concept obsolete, though smaller nets would still be needed for the entrance channels at advanced bases such as the Naval Base Majuro and Naval Base Ulithi. Third, new technology resulted in lightweight nets that could be handled by smaller vessels. The four large netlayers would be converted to carry and launch amphibious vehicles under the hull classification landing ship, vehicle (LSV).

=== 1940s ===
General characteristics of US Navy Aloe-class net laying ship
| Displacement: | 560 long tons (570 t), 700 long tons (710 t) laden |
| Length: | 151 ft 8 in (46.23 m) |
| Beam: | 30 ft 6 in (9.30 m) |
| Draft: | 10 ft 6 in (3.20 m) |
| Speed: | 14 knots (26 km/h; 16 mph) |
| Propulsion: | Diesel, single screw |
| Complement: | 40 |
| Armament: | 1 × 3 in (76 mm)/50-caliber dual-purpose gun, 3 × 20 mm (0.79 in) mounts |

The 77 small auxiliary net layers were built in three classes. The first 32, the Aloe class, were all launched in 1940 (before the attack on Pearl Harbor) and were built of steel. Due to the chronic shortage of steel during the war, the next 40, the Ailanthus class, were built of wood. The last 15, the Cohoes class, laid down in 1944 and 1945, were again constructed of steel. These vessels served in all theatres of war but particularly in the Pacific. Many of the ships were decommissioned after the war, but some continued in service for several more decades. Net layers were eventually made redundant by advances in underwater detection technology.

There were also at least 43 craft that were classed as net gate craft; many were simply powered barges.

To transport nets and to otherwise support the net layers, by 1943 specially built cargo ships, designated net cargo ships (AKN), were built. The first of this class was USS Indus. Indus worked in Naval Base Philippines. Finally in 1946, USS Montauk was converted back from an LSV to net cargo duties as USS Galilea.

== British and Commonwealth ==
The United Kingdom and British Commonwealth referred to net laying ship as boom defence vessels.

- Bar-class boom defence vessel built in the 1940s.
- Net-class boom defence vessel built in the 1930s.

== Gallery ==
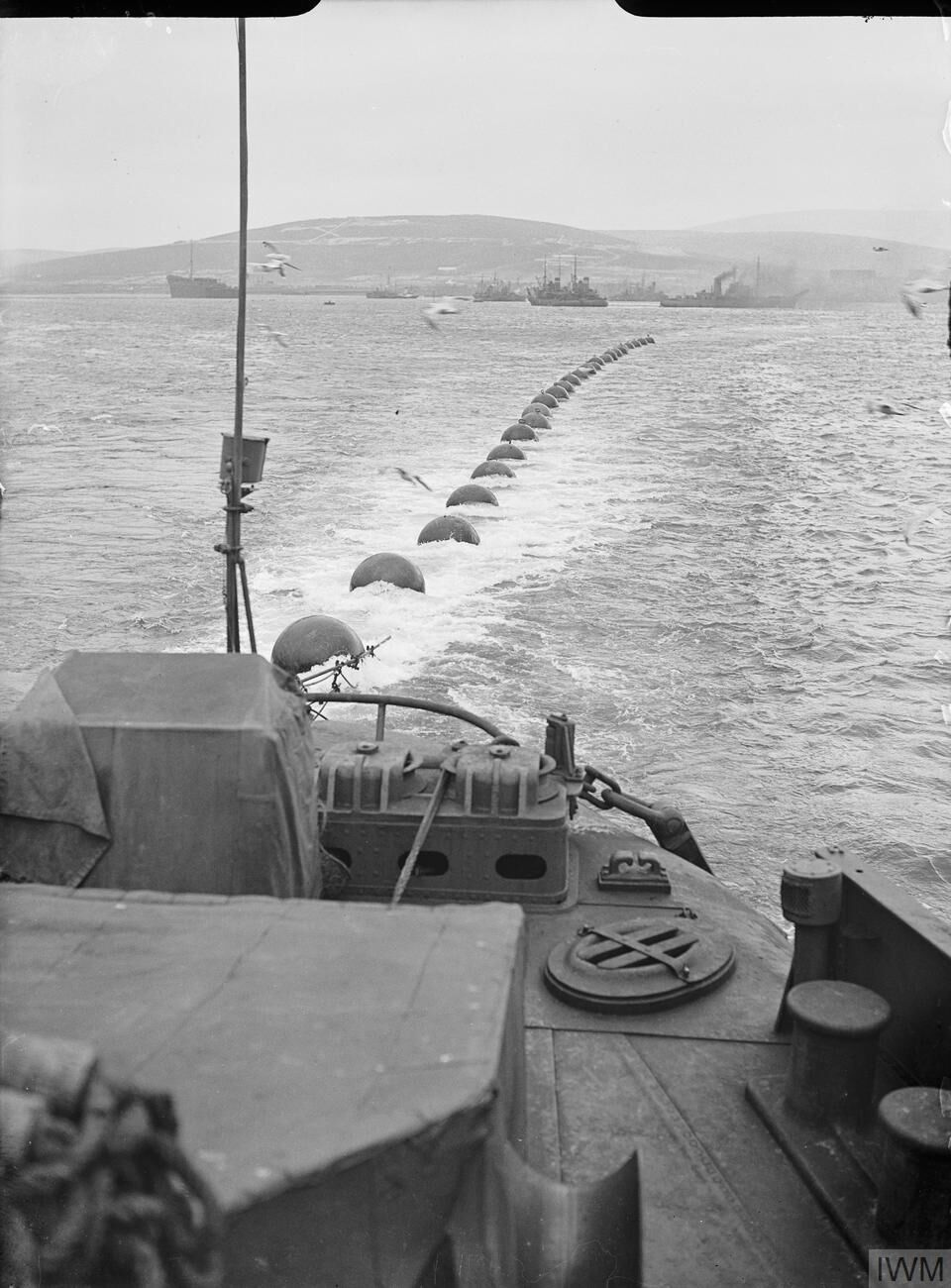
The boom defence net at Scapa Flow being towed into position by two Royal Navy boom defence vessels in 1943.

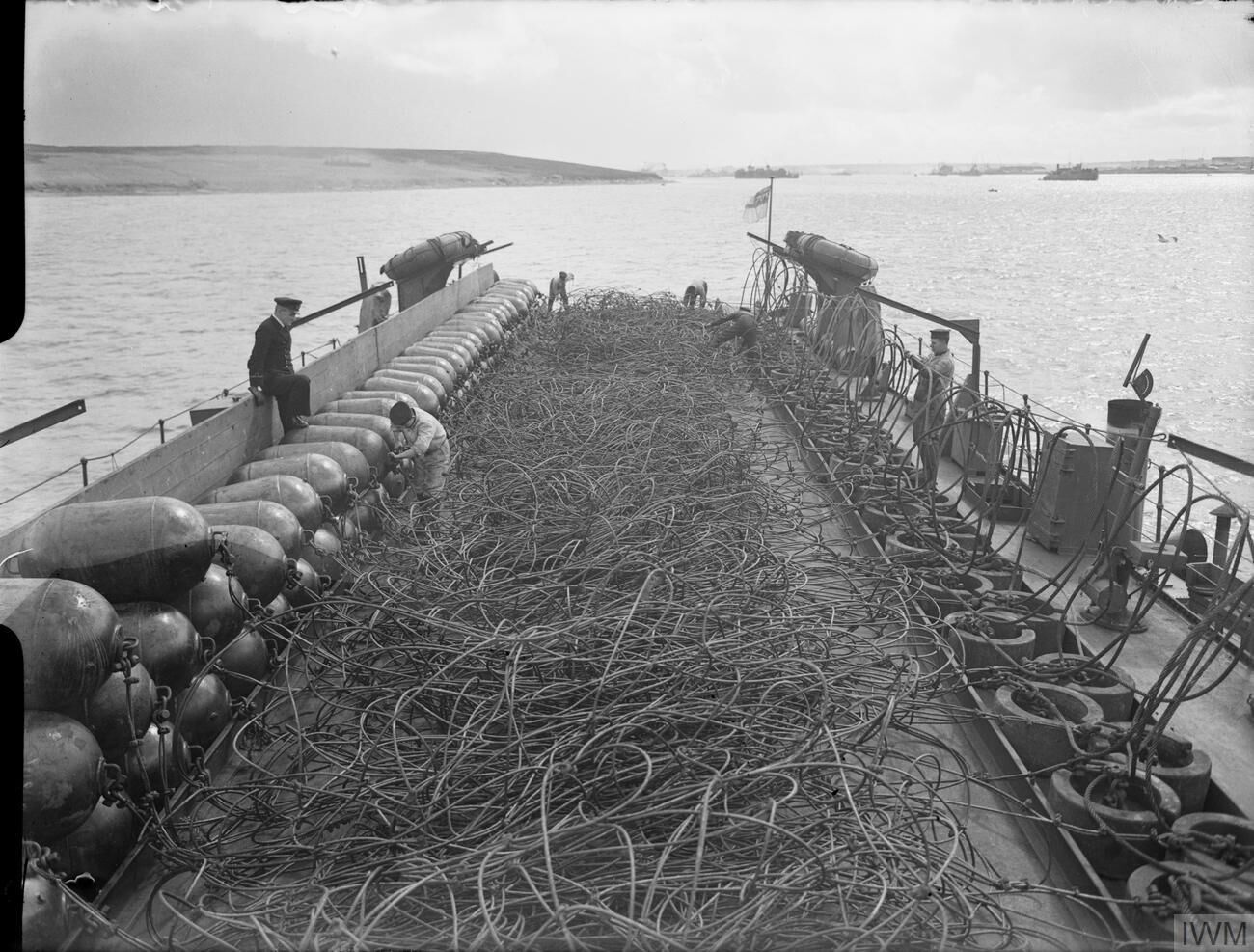
At Scapa Flow, a Royal Navy net laying vessel prepares to lay an anti-submarine net, which is 900 feet (270 m) long, weighs over 40 long tons (41 t) and could be laid in 4 minutes.

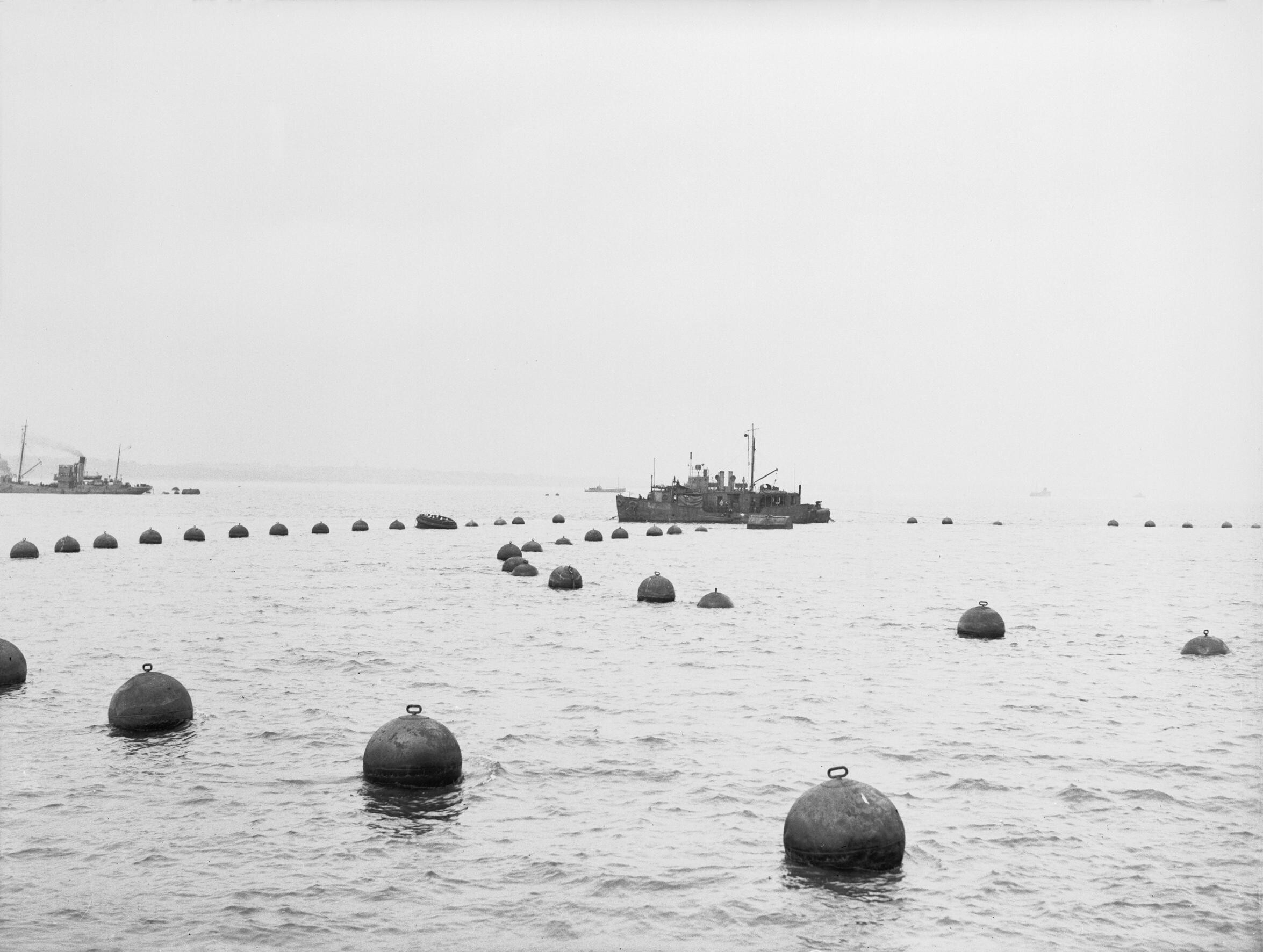
HMS Rogate, a Royal Navy "gate vessel" designed to open and close the boom and nets at Portsmouth Harbour during World War II.

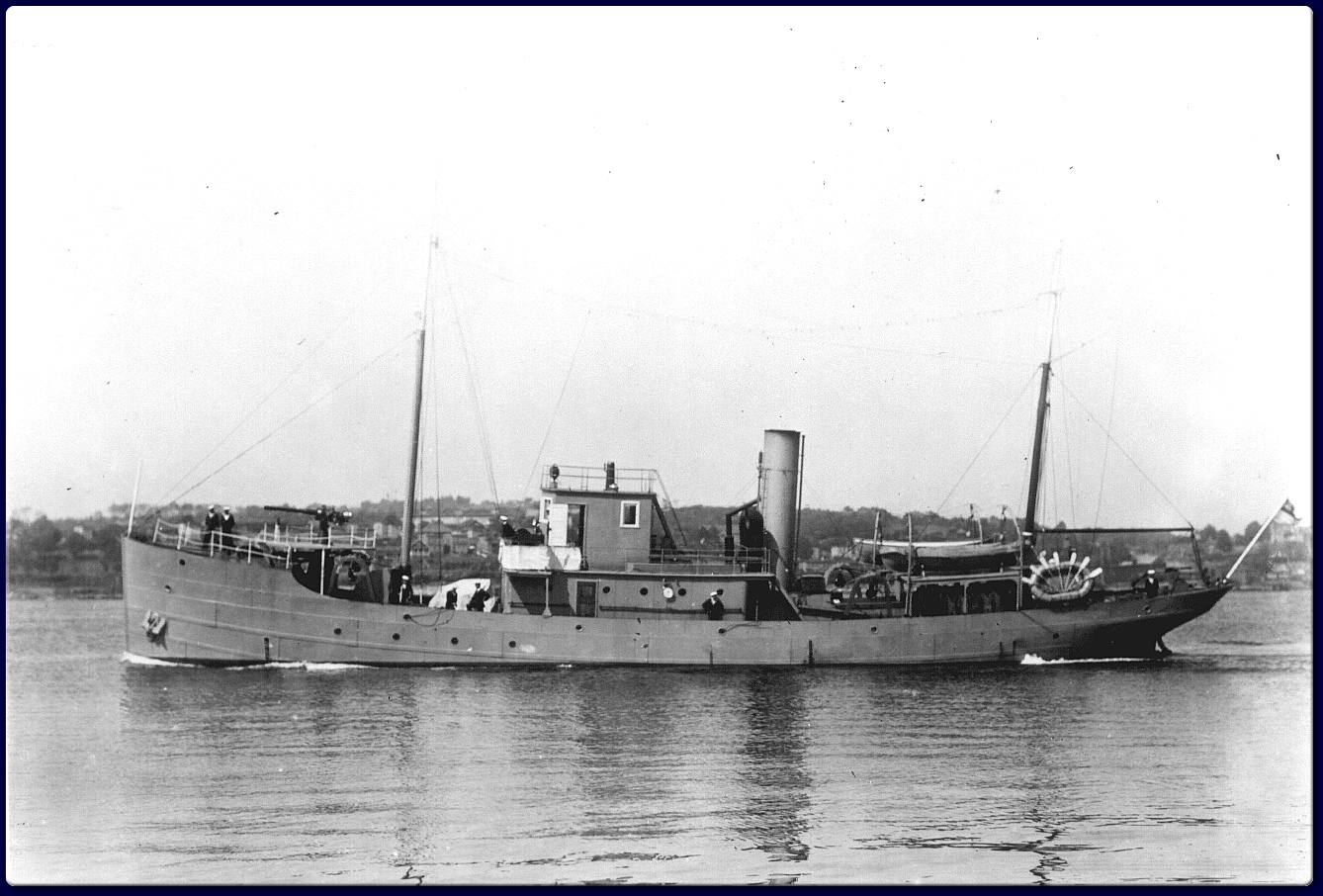
HMCS Ypres was a Battle-class trawler used by the Royal Canadian Navy as a gate vessel. She was sunk in a collision with a battleship in May 1940.

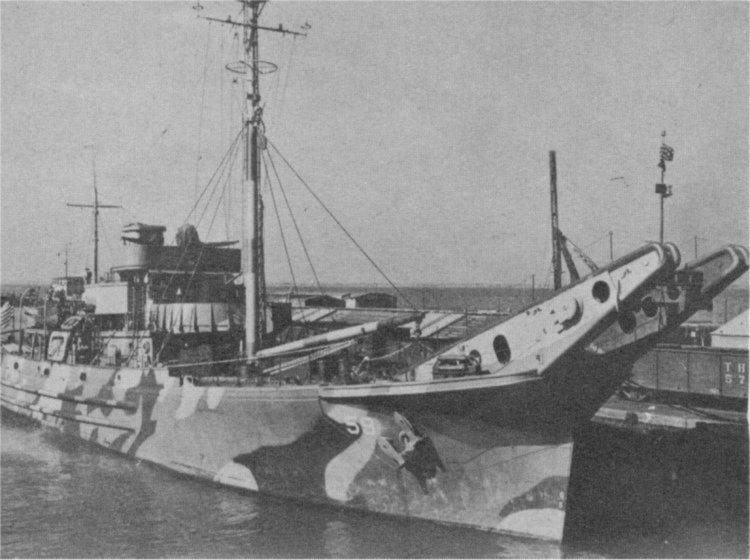
The US Navy wooden net tender, USS Terebinth in wartime camouflage.

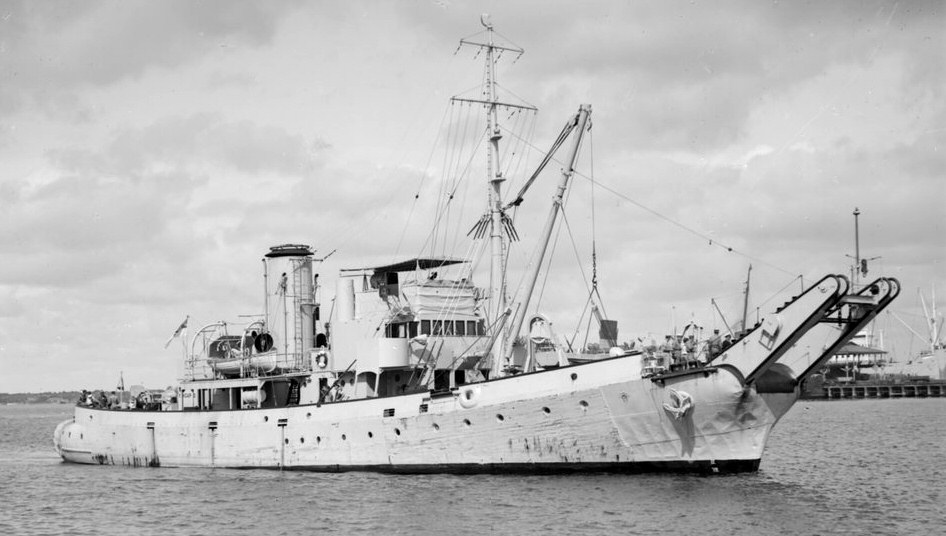
HMAS Kangaroo, a Bar-class boom defence vessel of the Royal Australian Navy in 1947.

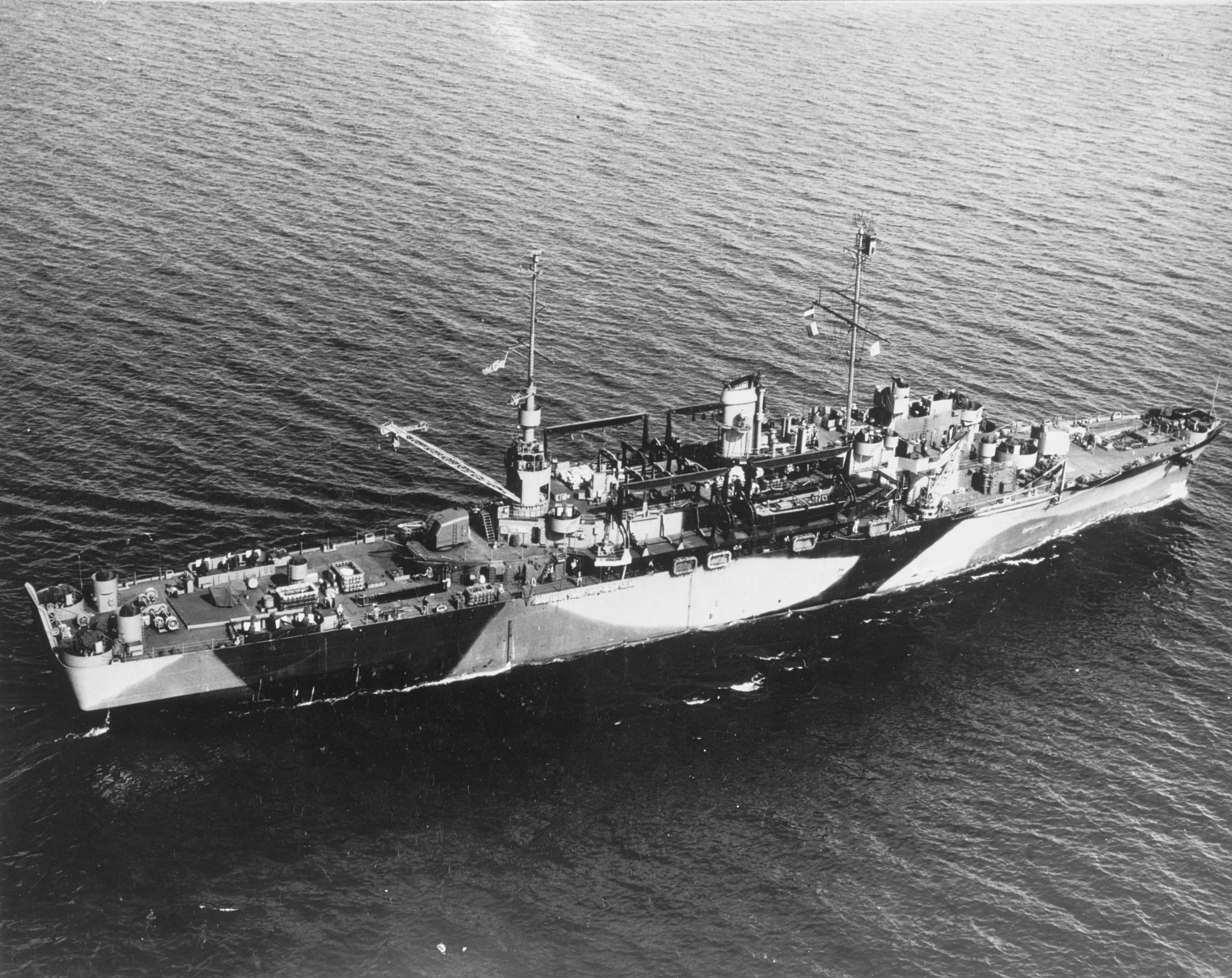
USS Montauk after completion of her LSV conversion (mostly internal).

== See also ==
- List of auxiliaries of the United States Navy § Net cargo ships (AKN)
- List of auxiliaries of the United States Navy § Net laying ships (AN)
- List of yard and district craft of the United States Navy § Yard Net Tenders (YN)
- List of yard and district craft of the United States Navy § Net Gate Craft (YNG)
- List of yard and district craft of the United States Navy § Net Tender Tugs (YNT)
- US Naval Advance Bases
- Wooden boats of World War II
