= Guam (1944) order of battle =

Order of battle for World War II battle

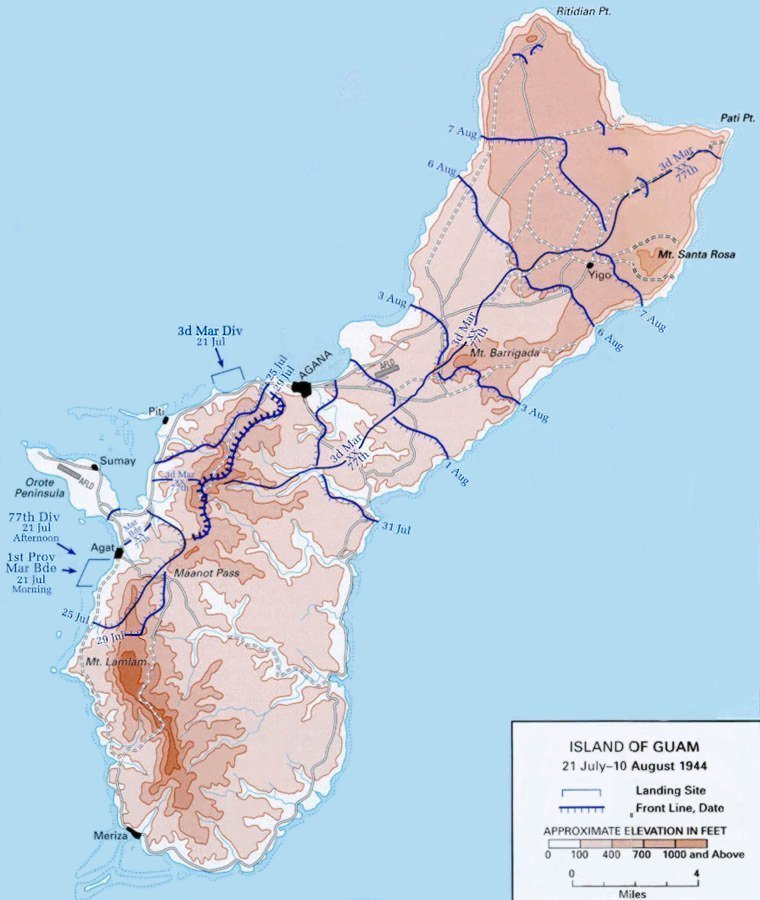
Landing beaches on west coast of Guam

On 21 July 1944, United States Marine and Army forces invaded the island of Guam, the southernmost of the Mariana Islands chain in the Central Pacific, with the intent to take control of the island from the Imperial Japanese Army. Operation Forager II, as it was called by American planners, was a phase of the Pacific theatre of World War II.

The Guam landings had been tentatively set for 18 June but a large Japanese carrier attack and stubborn resistance by the unexpectedly large Japanese garrison on Saipan led to the invasion of Guam being postponed for a month.

The island was declared secure on 10 August 1944.

== US command structure ==
Naval commanders for Operation Forager II

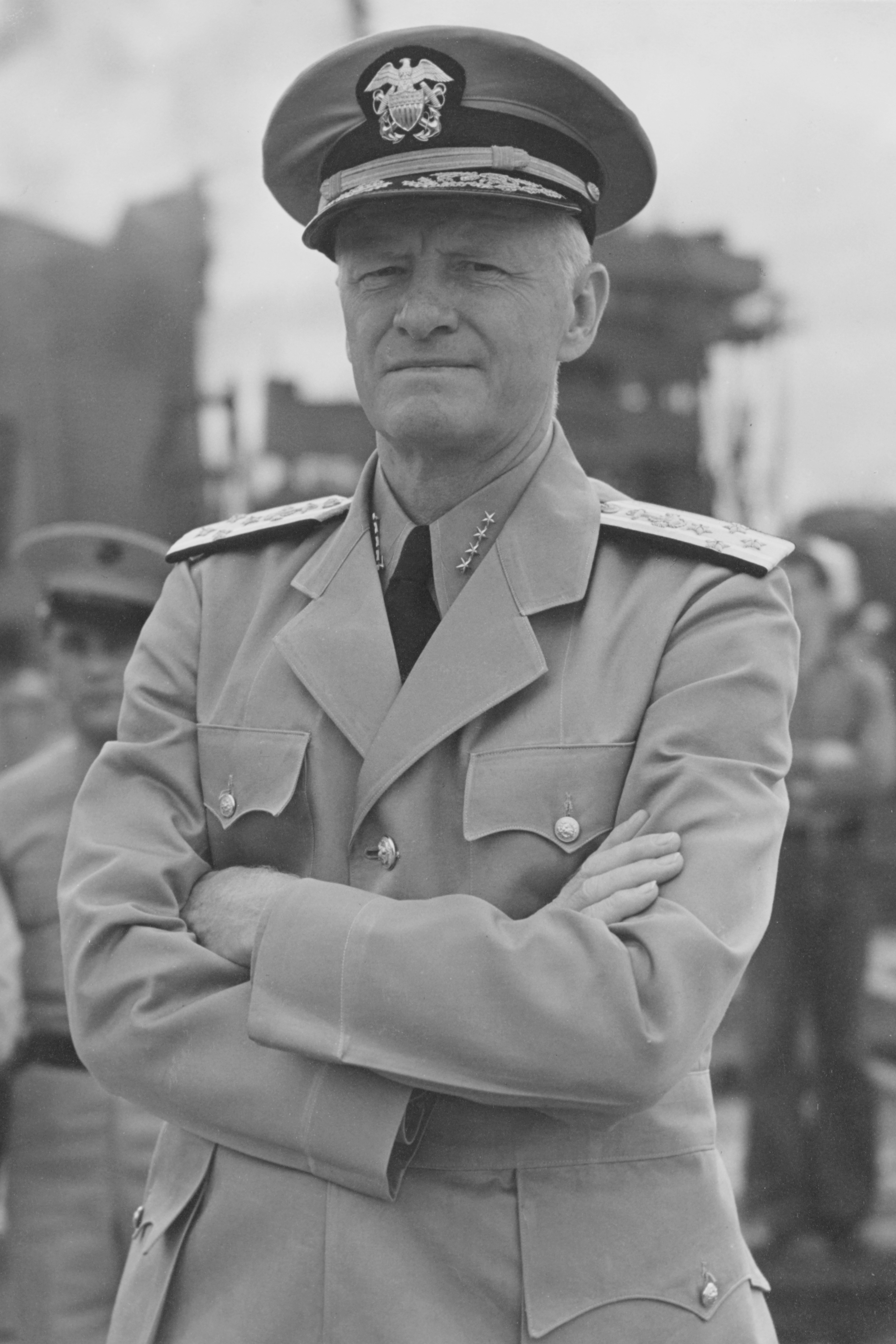
Adm. Chester W. Nimitz

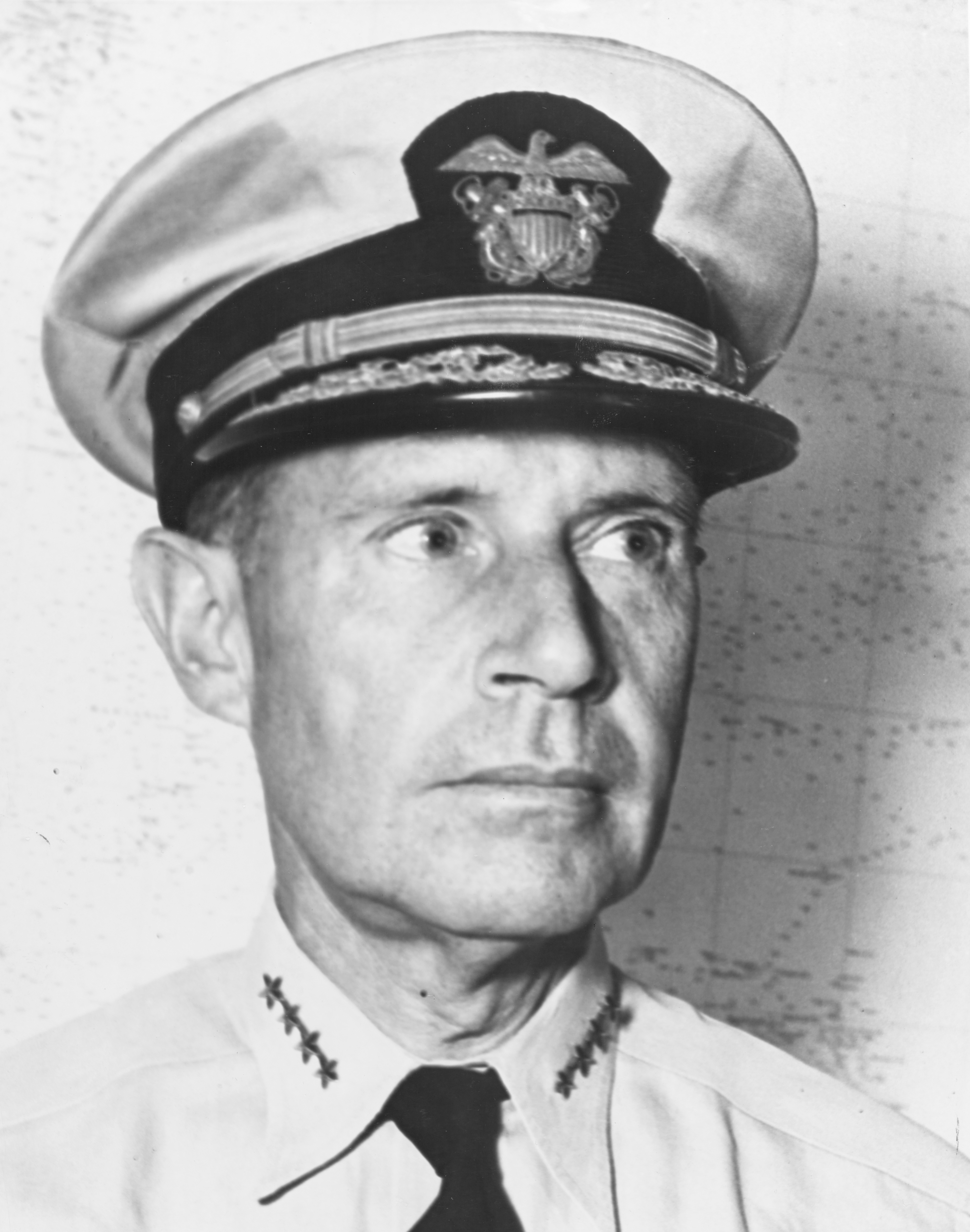
Vice Adm. Raymond A. Spruance

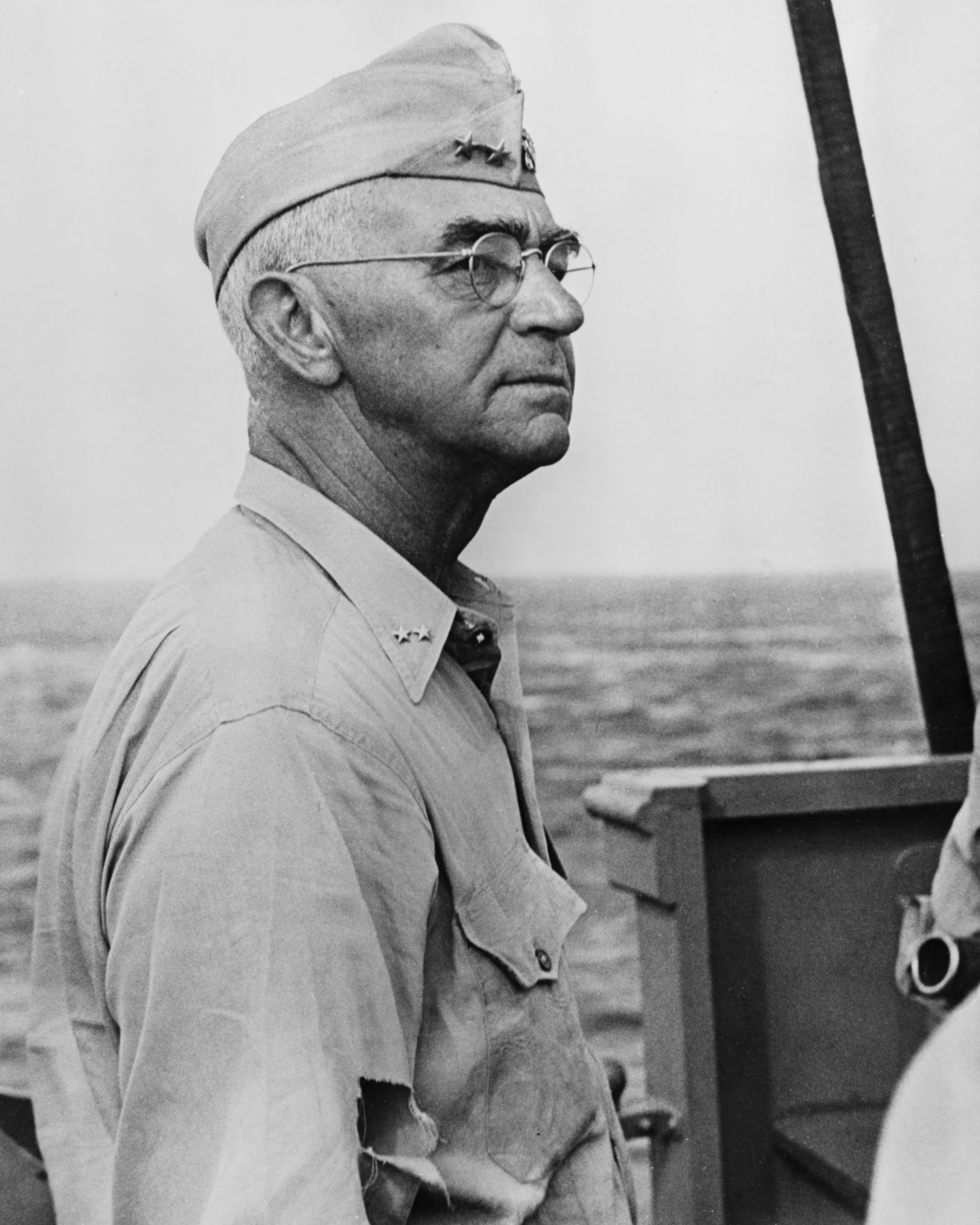
Rear Adm. Richmond Kelly Turner

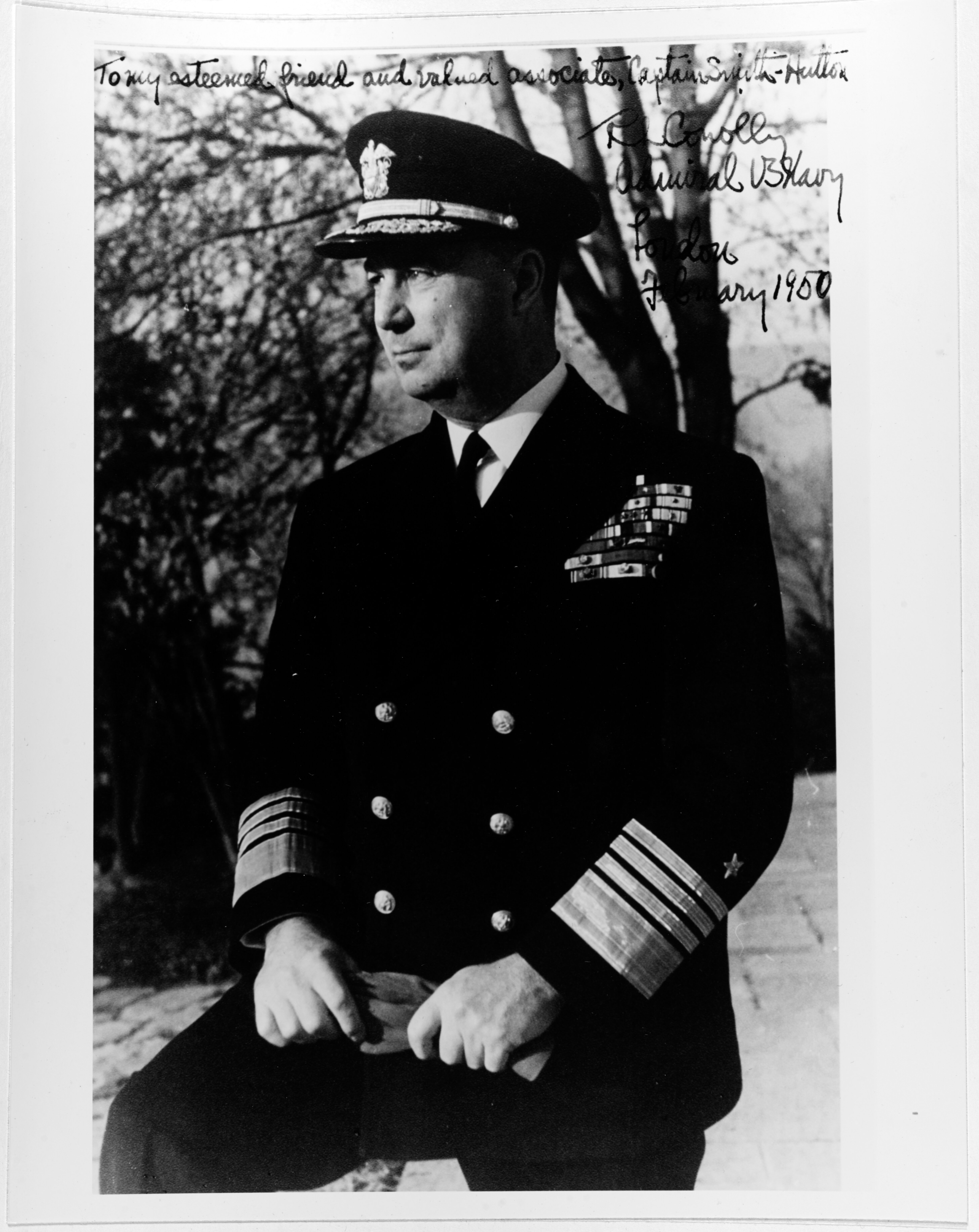
Vice Adm. Richard L. Conolly

Ground force commanders at Guam

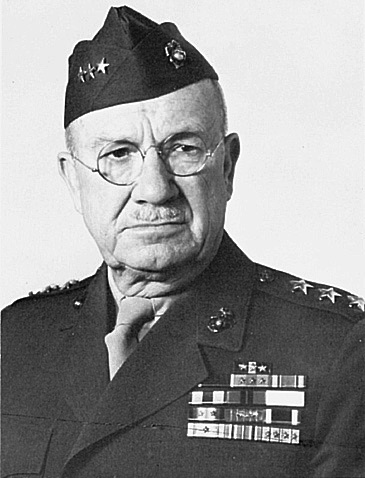
Lieut. Gen. Holland M. Smith, USMC

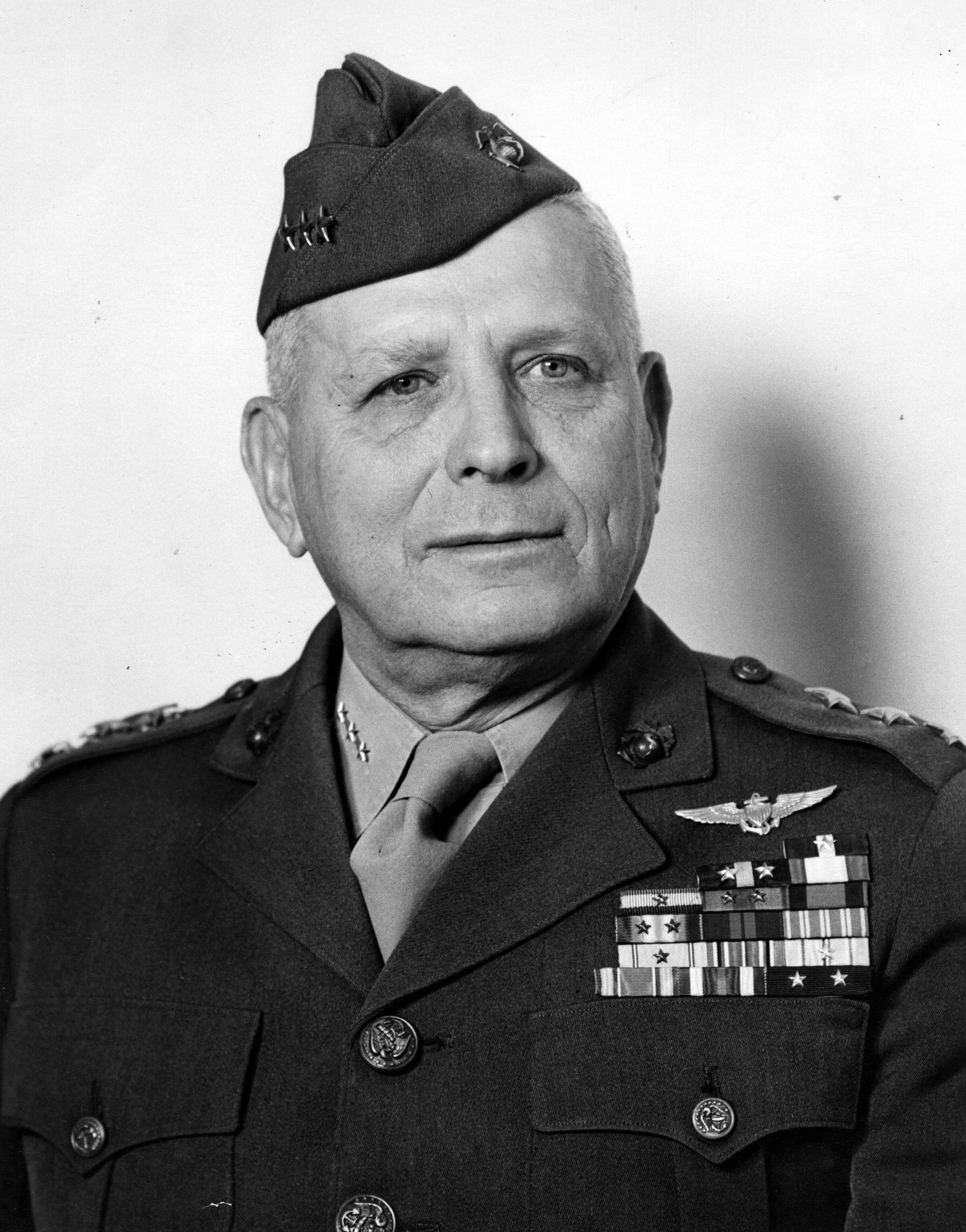
Maj. Gen. Roy S. Geiger, USMC

=== Naval ===
The roles of Commander in Chief, Pacific Ocean Areas (CINCPOA) and Commander in Chief, U.S. Pacific Fleet (CINCPAC), were both exercised by Admiral Chester W. Nimitz from his headquarters at Pearl Harbor, Hawaii.

Since the Marianas lie in the Central Pacific, their capture was the responsibility of the U.S. Fifth Fleet, led by Vice Admiral Raymond A. Spruance from aboard his flagship, heavy cruiser Indianapolis.

The ships and embarked troops of both Operation Forager I, for the Central Marianas (Saipan and Tinian) and Forager II, for the Southern Marianas (Guam), were under the overall command of Rear Admiral Richmond Kelly Turner aboard amphibious command ship Rocky Mount.

The ships and embarked troops for the Guam portion of Operation Forager were under the direct operational command of Rear Admiral Richard L. Conolly.

=== Ground troops ===
The Marine and Army landing forces for both the Central and Southern Marianas phases of Operation Forager were under the overall command of Maj. Gen. Holland M. "Howlin' Mad" Smith, USMC.

III Marine Amphibious Corps (Maj. Gen. Roy S. Geiger, USMC)

Northern landing area: 3rd Marine Division (Maj. Gen. Allen H. Turnage, USMC)
Southern landing area: 1st Provisional Marine Brigade (Brig. Gen. Lemuel C. Shepherd Jr., USMC)
Reserve: 77th Infantry ("Statue of Liberty") Division (Army) (Maj. Gen. Andrew D. Bruce, USA)

== US forces ==
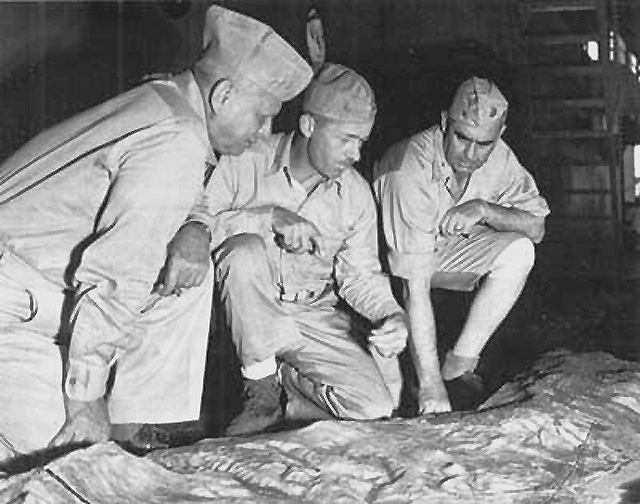
III Marine Amphibious Corps commander, Major General Roy S. Geiger; his chief of staff, Colonel Merwin H. Silverthorn; and Corps Artillery commander, Brigadier General Pedro A. del Valle

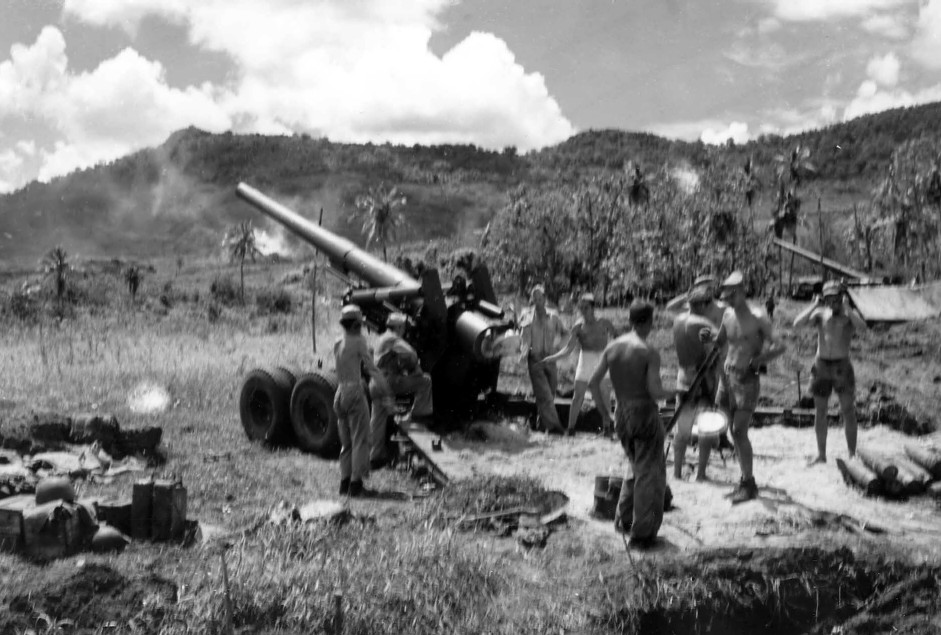
US Marine Corps 155mm Howitzer on White Beach

=== Naval forces (Task Force 53 Southern Attack Force) ===
Rear Admiral Richard L. Conolly

==== Task Group 53.1 Northern Attack Group ====
Rear Admiral Richard L. Conolly

===== Task Group 53.3 Northern Transport Group =====
Captain Pat Buchanan

Transdiv 2, Captain H. D. Baker

APAs: USS President Jackson Captain A. F. Junker; President Hayes Commander H. E. Schieke; President Adams Commander M. C. Erwin
AP: USS President Monroe Commander J. M. Payne
AKA: USS Titania Commander H. E. Berger

Transdiv 8, Captain F. R. Talbot

APAs: USS Crescent City Commander L. L. Rowe; Warren Commander W. A. McHale Windsor Commander D. C. Woodward
AP: USS Wharton Captain J. J. Fallon
AKA: USS Libra Captain F. F. Ferris

Transdiv 24, Captain Buchanan

APAs: USS Du Page Captain G. M. Wauchope; Elmore Commander Drayton Harrison; Wayne Commander T. V. Cooper
Hospital transport: USS Rixey Commander P. H. Jenkins
AKA: USS Aquarius Captain R. V. Marron USCG
LSD: USS Epping Forest Commander Lester Martin; Gunston Hall Commander D. E. Collins

Screen, Captain E. M. Thompson

DDs: USS John Rodgers Commander H. O. Parish; Stevens Lieutenant Commander W. M. Rakow; Harrison Lieutenant Commander W. V. Combs; McKee Lieutenant Commander R. B. Allen; Schroeder Lieutenant Commander R. W. McElrath; Colahan Commander D. T. Wilber; Haggard (Commander J. H. Nevins on board), Lieutenant Commander D. A. Harris; Hailey Commander P. H. Brady
DMSs: USS Hogan Lieutenant Commander W. H. Sublette; Stansbury Lieutenant Commander D. M. Granstrom; Hopkins Lieutenant D. P. Payne

===== Task Group 53.16 Tractor Group Three =====
Captain G. B. Carter

LST Unit 3, Commander V. K. Busck: 16 LSTs
Control Unit, Captain G. B. Carter: DD USS Stembel Commander W. L. Tagg; 9 SCs.
LCI(G) Unit, Commander W. R. McCaleb: 7 LCI(G)

===== Task Group 53.9 Minesweeping and Hydrographic Group =====
Lieutenant Commander G. M. Estep

Minesweepers: USS Skylark Lieutenant Commander G. M. Estep; Starling Lieutenant R. C. Biles; 6 YMS
Ocean tug: USS Apache
Salvage vessel: USS Grapple
Net layers: USS Agenor, Aloe
Repair ship: USS Holly
APD: USS Dent Commander R. A. Wilhelm

Reconnaissance and demolition unit: Commander R. A. Wilhelm

==== Task Group 53.2 Southern Attack Group ====
Rear Admiral Lawrence F. Reifsnider

===== Task Group 53.3 Northern Transport Group =====
Captain J. B. McGovern

Transdiv 4, Captain McGovern

APAs: USS Zeilin, Ormsby, George Clymer Captain M. T. Farrar
AP: USS President Polk Commander C. J. Ballreich
AKA: USS Virgo
Transdiv 6, Captain T. B. Brittain
APAs: USS Fayette Commander J. C. Lester, Harry Lee; William P. Biddle Captain L. F. Brown; Leedstown Commander Harold Bye; Centaurus

Transdiv 38, Captain J. B. Heffernan

APAs: USS Lamar Captain B. K. Culver; Alpine Commander G. K. G. Reilly
APs: USS Golden City Commander C. M. Furlow; Starlight Commander W. O. Britton
AKA: USS Alshain Commander R. E. Krause
LSD: USS Carter Hall Lieutenant Commander F. J. Harris

Screen, Captain W. P. Burford

DDs: USS Farenholt Lieutenant Commander K. S. Shook; Sigsbee Lieutenant Commander G. P. Chung-Hoon; Dashiell; Murray; Johnston Commander E. E. Evans; Franks Commander N. A. Lidstone; Preston Commander G. S. Patrick; Anthony Lieutenant Commander C. J. Van Arsdall; Wadsworth Commander J. F. Walsh; Wedderburn Commander J. L. Wilfong

===== Task Group 53.17 Tractor Group Four =====
Commander E. A. McFall

DD: USS Black Lieutenant Commander E. R. King Jr.
LST Unit 4, Commander R. W. Cuder

14 LSTs

Control Unit, Commander Henry Crommelin

DD: USS Ringgold Lieutenant Commander T. F. Conley
7 SCs

LCI(G) Unit, Lieutenant H. B. Rabenstein

9 LCI(G)s

Seaplane Servicing Unit, Lieutenant Commander J. A. Pridmore

Tender USS Williamson Lieutenant W. H. Ayer
APc: APc-46 Lieutenant R. M. Rosse

===== Task Group 53.6 Minesweeping and Hydrographic Group =====
Commander R. R. Sampson

Sweep Unit 3, Lieutenant Commander W. B. Porter

Minesweepers: USS Sheldrake, Lieutenant T. W. Cross; Swallow Lieutenant (jg) M. McVickar

Sweep Unit 4, Lieutenant E. E. McCarthy

6 YMS

Sweep Unit 6, Commander R. T. Sampson

DMS: USS Hamilton Lieutenant Commander John Clague; Perry Lieutenant Commander I. G. Stubbart; Long Lieutenant S. Caplan

Salvage and Service Unit, Commander E. C. Genereaux

Tug USS Lipan Lieutenant N. R. Terpening

Reconnaissance and Demolition Unit, Lieutenant F. M. Christiansen

APDs: USS Clemson Lieutenant W. F. Moran; Kane Lieutenant F. M. Christiansen

===== Task Group 53.5 Southern Fire Support Group =====
Rear Admiral W. L. Ainsworth

Unit 6, Rear Admiral W. L. Ainsworth

CL: USS Honolulu, Captain H. R. Thurber
BBs: USS Pennsylvania, Captain C. F. Martin; Idaho, Captain H. D. Clarke
DDs: USS Anthony (Commander E. B. Taylor on board), Commander B. Van Mater; Wadsworth, Commander J. F. Walsh; Hudson, Lieutenant Commander R. R. Pratt
APD: USS Dickerson, Lieutenant Commander J. R. Cain
Seaplane tender: USS Williamson, Lieutenant Commander J. A. Pridmore
Minesweeper: HocAN, Lieutenant Commander W. H. Sublette

Unit 7, Rear Admiral G. L. Weyler

BB: USS New Mexico, Captain E. M. Zacharias
CAs: USS Minneapolis, Captain Harry Slocum; San Francisco, Captain H. E. Overesch
DDs: USS Halford, Lieutenant Commander R. J. Hardy; Terry, Lieutenant Commander J. M. Lee; Braine, Commander W. W. Fitts
APD: USS Talbot, Lieutenant Commander C. C. Morgan
Minesweeper: USS Stansbury, Lieutenant Commander D. M. Granstrom

Unit 8, Rear Admiral C. T. Joy

CAs: USS Wichita, Captain J. J. Mahoney; New Orleans, Captain J. E. Hurff
CL: USS St. Louis, Captain R. H. Roberts
DDs: USS Fullam, Commander W. D. Kelly; Guest, Commander M. G. Kennedy; Bennett, Lieutenant Commander P. F. Hauck

===== Task Group 53.7 Carrier Support Group =====
Rear Admiral V. H. Ragsdale

CarDiv 22, Rear Admiral T. L. Sprague

USS Sangamon, Captain M. E. Browder

Air Group 37, Lieutenant Commander S. E. Hindman

VF-37: 22 F6F fighters
VT-37: 1 TBF, 8 TBM torpedo bombers

USS Suwannee, Captain W. D. Johnson

Air Group 60, Lieutenant Commander H. O. Feilbach

VF-60: 22 F6F fighters
VT-60: 8 TBM, 1 TBF torpedo bombers

USS Chenango, Captain Dixwell Ketcham

Air Group 35, Lieutenant Commander F. T. Moore

VF-35: 22 F6F fighters
VT-35: 8 TBM, 1 TBF torpedo bombers

Screen, Captain J. T. Bottom

DDs: USS Erben, Walker, Abbot, Hale

Cardiv 24, Rear Admiral F. B. Stump

USS Corregidor, Captain R. L. Thomas

VC-41: 14 FM fighters, 12 TBM torpedo bombers

USS Coral Sea, Captain P. W. Watson

VC-33: 14 FM figghters, 8 TBF, 4 TBM torpedo bombers

Screen, Commander C. E, Carroll

DDs: USS Bullard, Chauncey, Kidd

===== Task Group 53.19 Corps Reserve Group =====
Captain H. B. Knowles

Transdiv 18, Captain H. B. Knowles

APAs: USS Monrovia, Feland, Frederick Funston
APs: USS War Hawk, SS China Victory
AKA: USS Alcyone

Transdiv 28, Captain H. C. Flanagan

APAs:: USS Bolivar, Sheridan, Doyen
AP: USS Comet, SS Claremont Victory
AKA: USS Almaack

Screen, Commander W. R. Edsall

DDs: USS Melvin, Shaw, Selfridge, Aulick
DMSs: USS Palmer, Zane
DE: USS Baron, Elden

===== Mobile service bases =====
Servron 10, Commodore W. R. Carter

Survey ship: USS Hydrographer
Repair ships: USS Ajax, Vestal, Hector, Luzon
Tenders: USS Phaon, Cascade, Markab, Prairie
DMS: USS Dorsey
Degausser: USS YDG-6
Auxiliaries: USS Argonne, Orvetta
Tugs: USS Arapaho, Keosanqua, Mataco, Ontario, ATR-44, ATR-46
Five floating docks

Servron 12, Captain L. S. Fiske

Survey ship: USS Bowditch
Net ships: USS Sagittarius, Tuscana, Papaya, Chinquapin
Dredges: Tualatin, Haines, Indiana
Salvage vessels: USS Clamp, Gear
Coast Guard cutters: USCGC Woodbine, Tupelo, Papaw
Tugs: USS Pakana, USS Zuni
Freighters: USS William Ward Burrows, Alkes, City of Dalhart
Two floating docks

===== Tanker groups =====
Oilers: USS Monongahela, Tappahannock, Neosho, Cahaba, Ashtabula, Lackawanna
Water tankers: USS Oklawaha, Niobrara
Store ship: USS Boreas
Auxilary cargo ship: USS Azimech
Miscellaneous unclassified vessels: USS Elk, Beagle

=== Expeditionary troops (Task Force 56) ===
Lieutenant General Holland M. Smith

Chief of Staff: Brigadier General Graves B. Erskine (Note: Commanded 3rd Marine Division on Iwo Jima.)

Personnel Officer (G-1): Lieutenant Colonel Albert F. Metze
Intelligence Officer (G-2): Colonel St. Julien R. Marshall
Operations Officer (G-3): Colonel John C. McQueen
Logistics Officer (G-4): Colonel Raymond E. Knapp
Plans Officer (G-5): Colonel Joseph T. Smith

Southern Troops and Landing Force (Task Group 56.2 – Guam)
Consisting of III Amphibious Corps

III Marine Amphibious Corps
Major General Roy S. Geiger

Chief of Staff: Brigadier General Merwin H. Silverthorn

Personnel Officer (C-1): Colonel William J. Scheyer
Intelligence Officer (C-2): Lieutenant Colonel William F. Coleman
Operations Officer (C-3): Colonel Walter A. Wachtler
Logistics Officer (C-4): Lieutenant Colonel Frederick L. Wieseman

III Marine Amphibious Corps Artillery
Brigadier General Pedro del Valle (Note: Commanded 1st Marine Division on Okinawa.)

Chief of Staff : Colonel John A. Bemis

Personnel Officer (A-1): Major James A. Tatsch
Intelligence Officer (A-2): Warrant Officer David G. Garnett
Operations Officer (A-3): Lieutenant Colonel Frederick P. Henderson
Logistics Officer (A-4): Major Frederick W. Miller

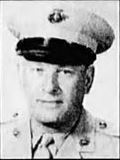
Lieutenant Colonel Marvin H. Floom, USMC

1st 155mm Howitzer Battalion

Commanding Officer: Colonel James J. Keating
Executive Officer: Major George H. Ford
Operations Officer (Bn-3): Major Marshall J. Hooper

2nd 155mm Howitzer Battalion

Commanding Officer: Lieutenant Colonel Marvin H. Floom
Executive Officer: Major Gene N. Schraeder
Operations Officer (Bn-3): Major Earl J. Fowse

==== Northern landing area (West of Agana) ====
3rd Marine Division command on Guam

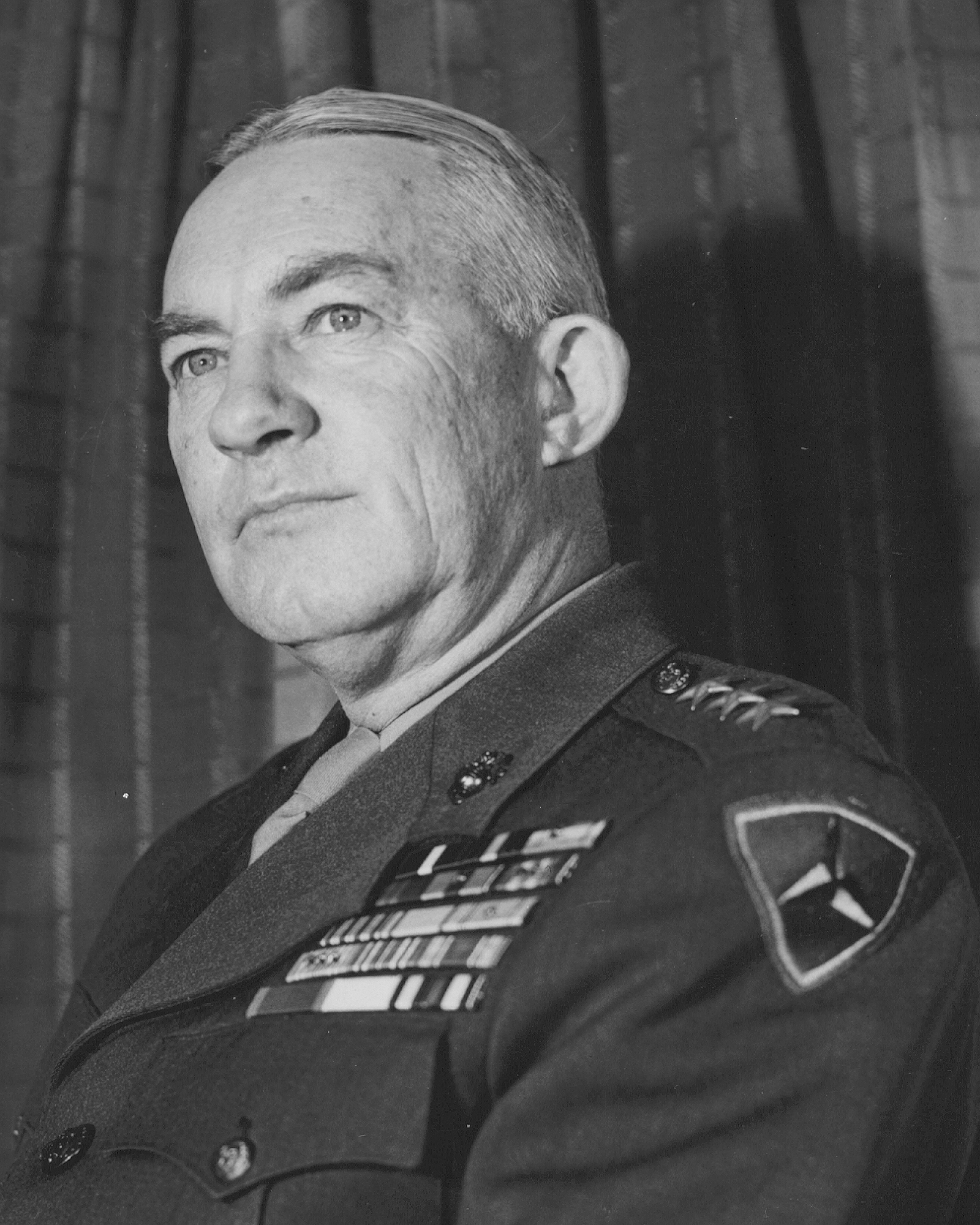
Major General Allen H. Turnage

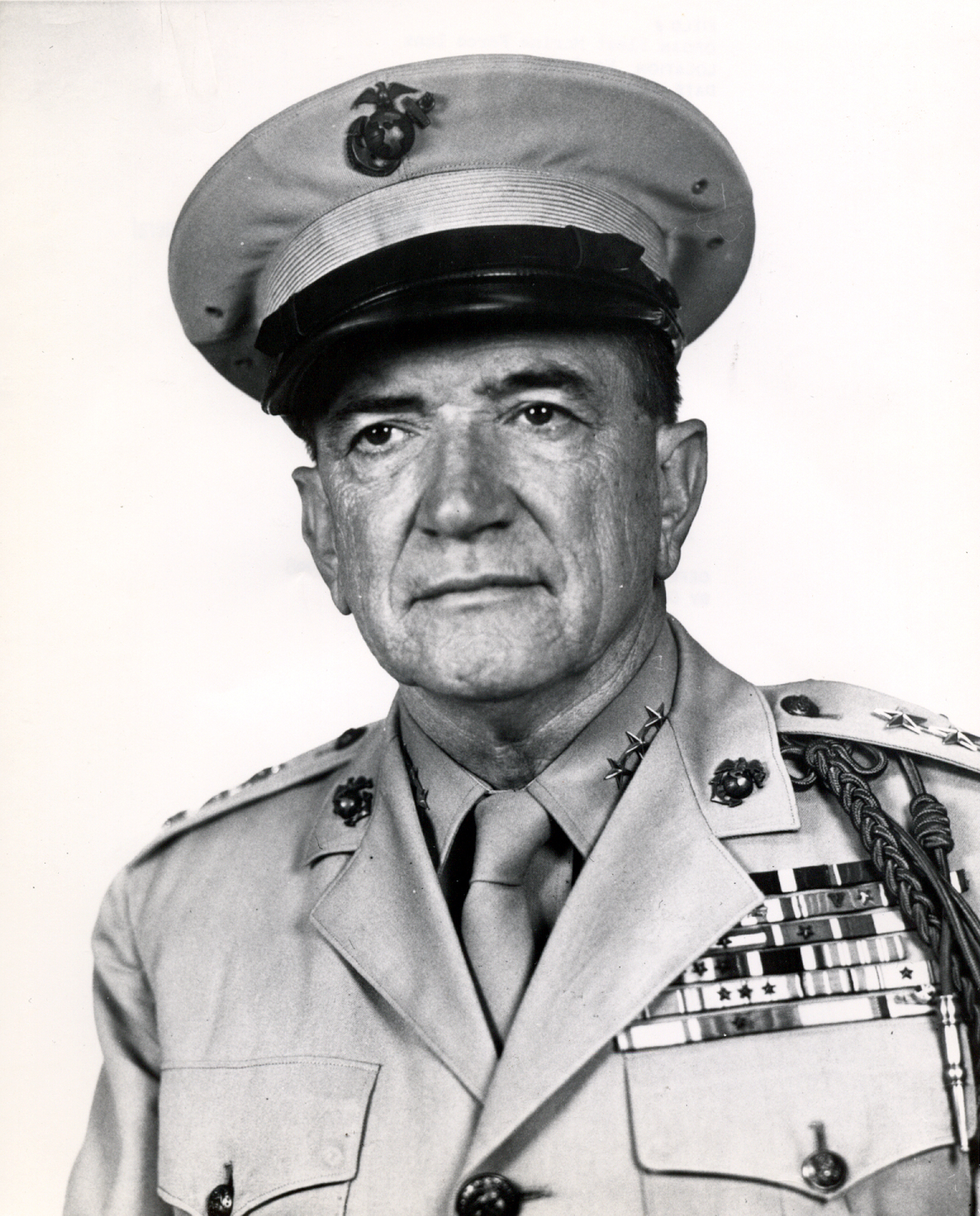
Alfred H. Noble as a major general

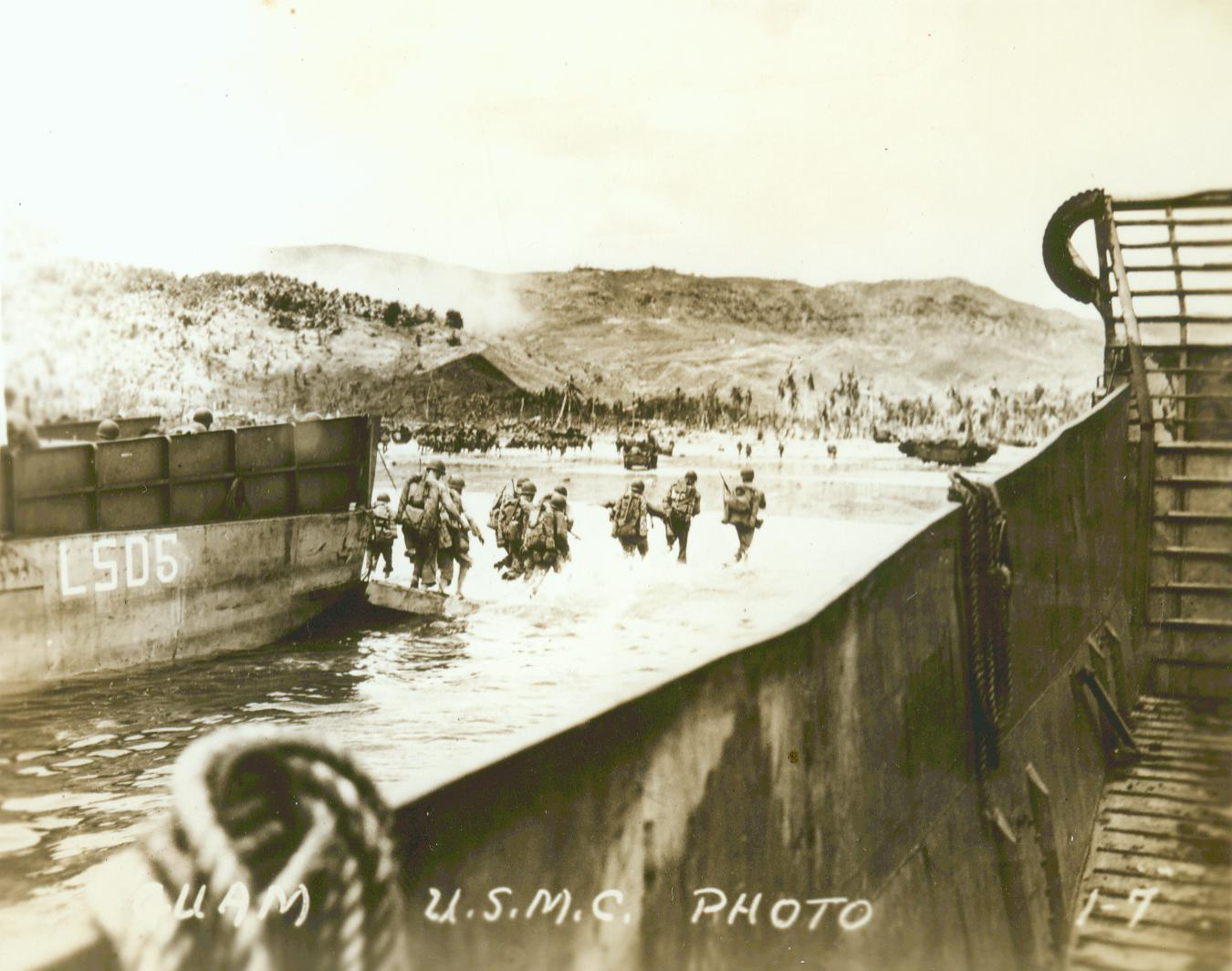
Marines wading ashore at Guam.

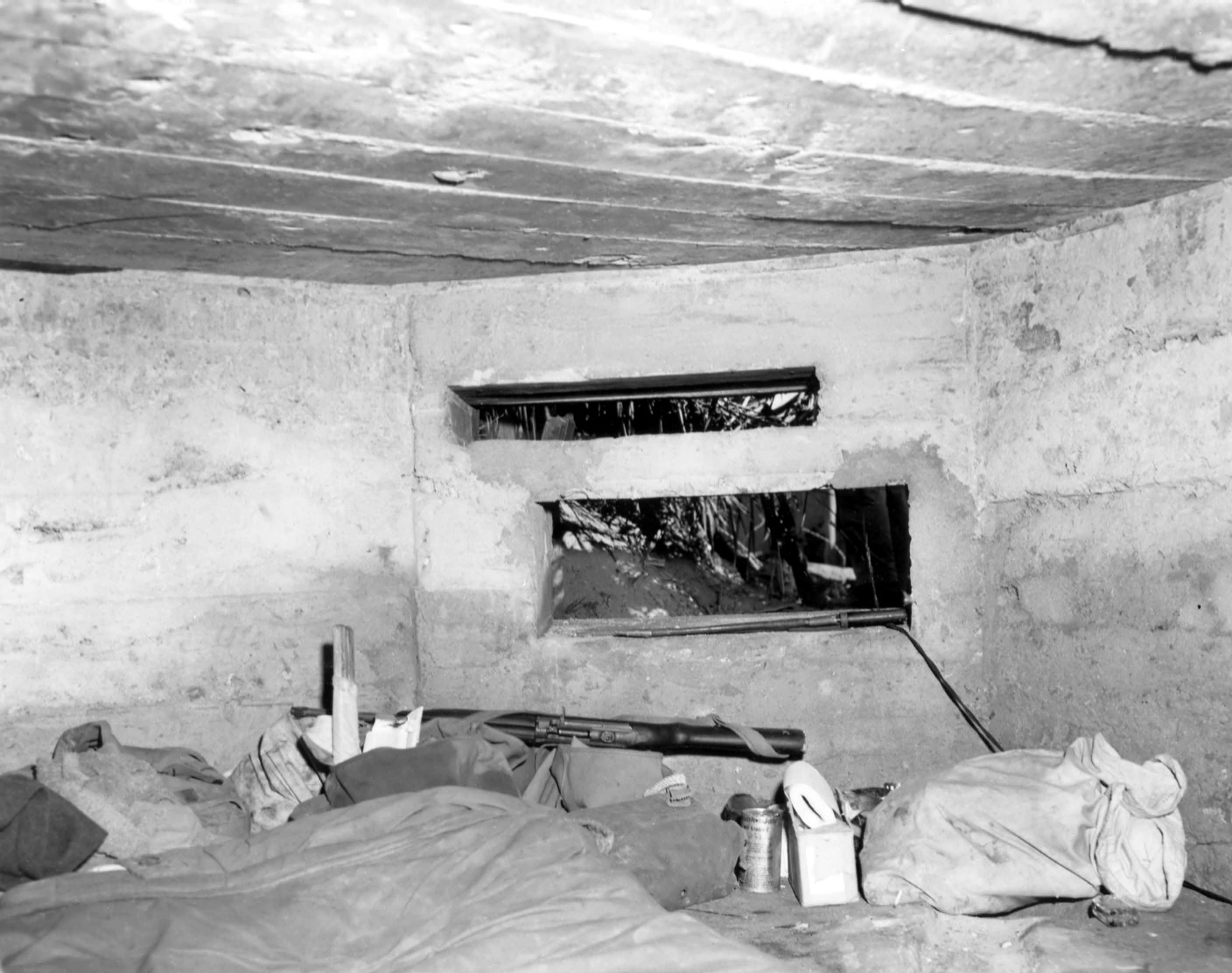
Interior of Japanese concrete pillbox on Guam.

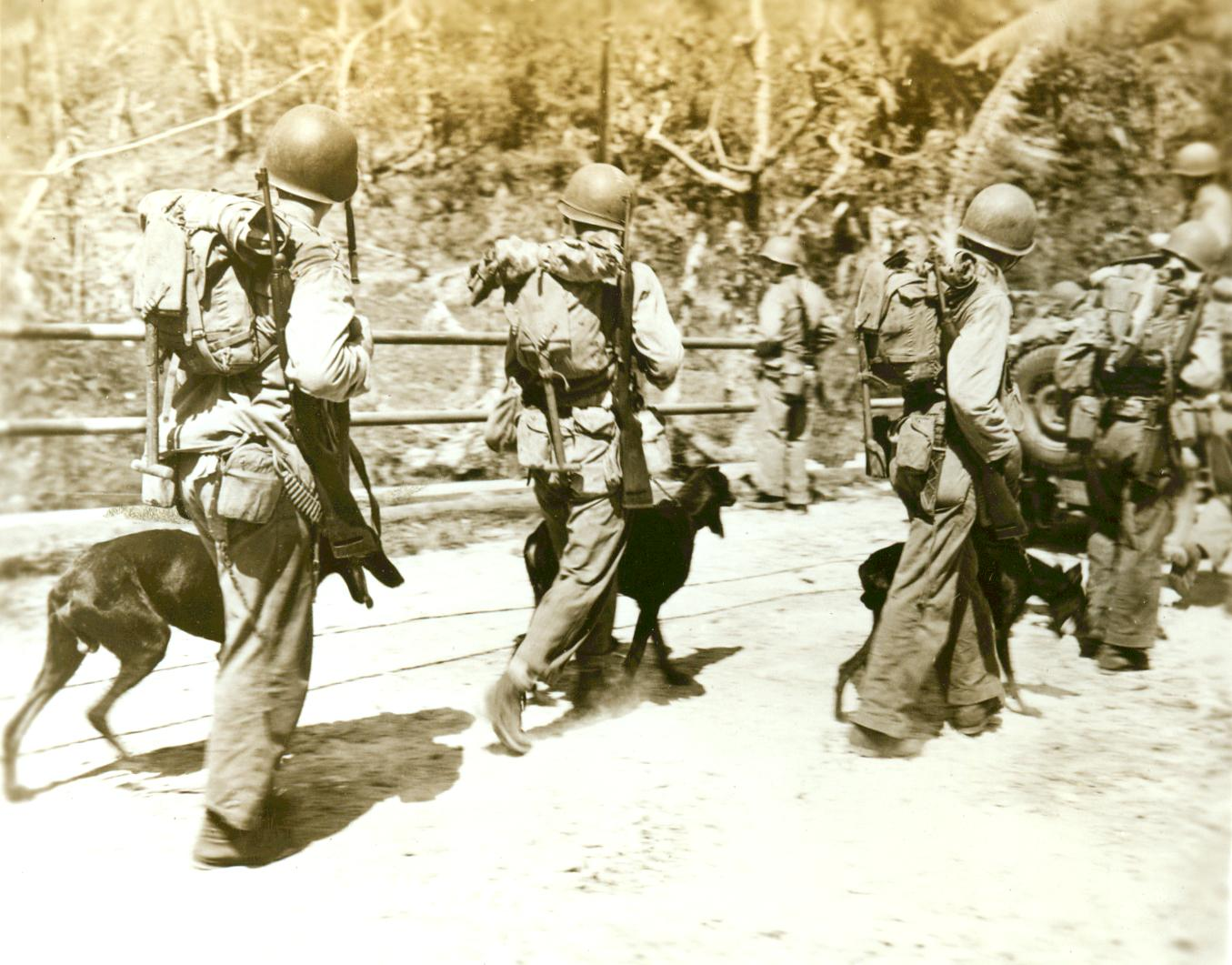
Marines with war dogs.

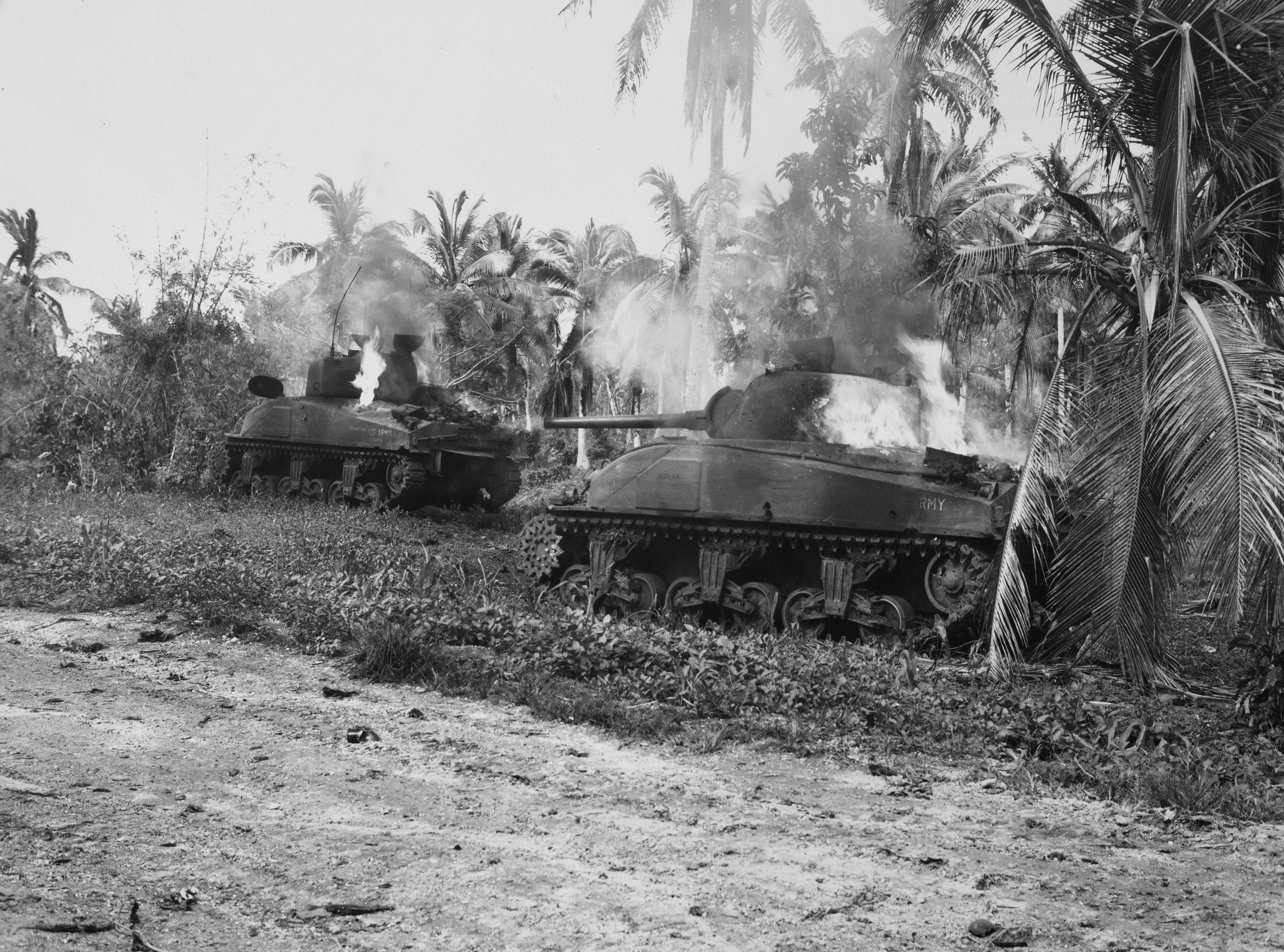
Marine M-4 Sherman tanks burn after being struck by Japanese anti-tank gun fire near the village of Yigo.

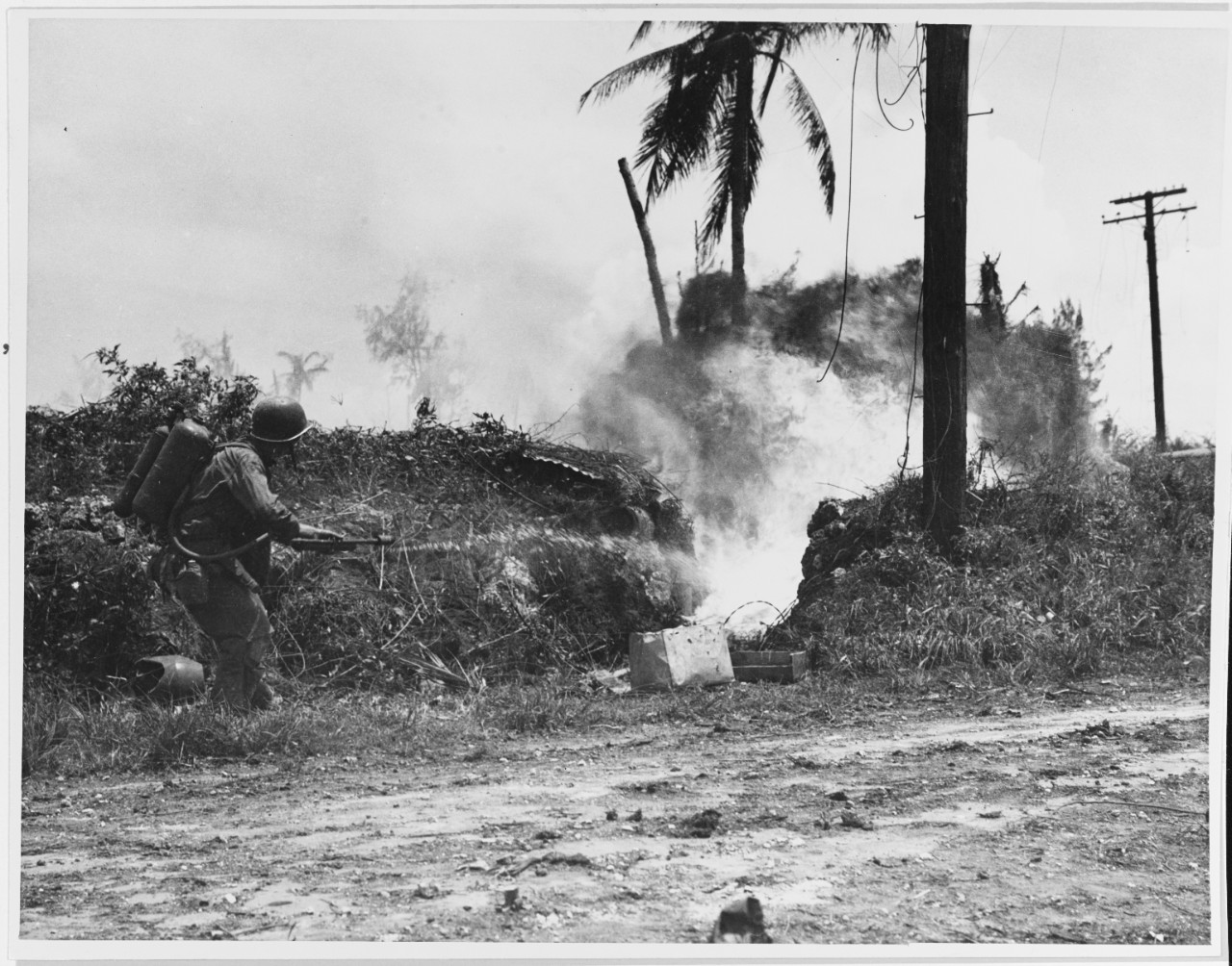
Marines on Guam using flamethrower.

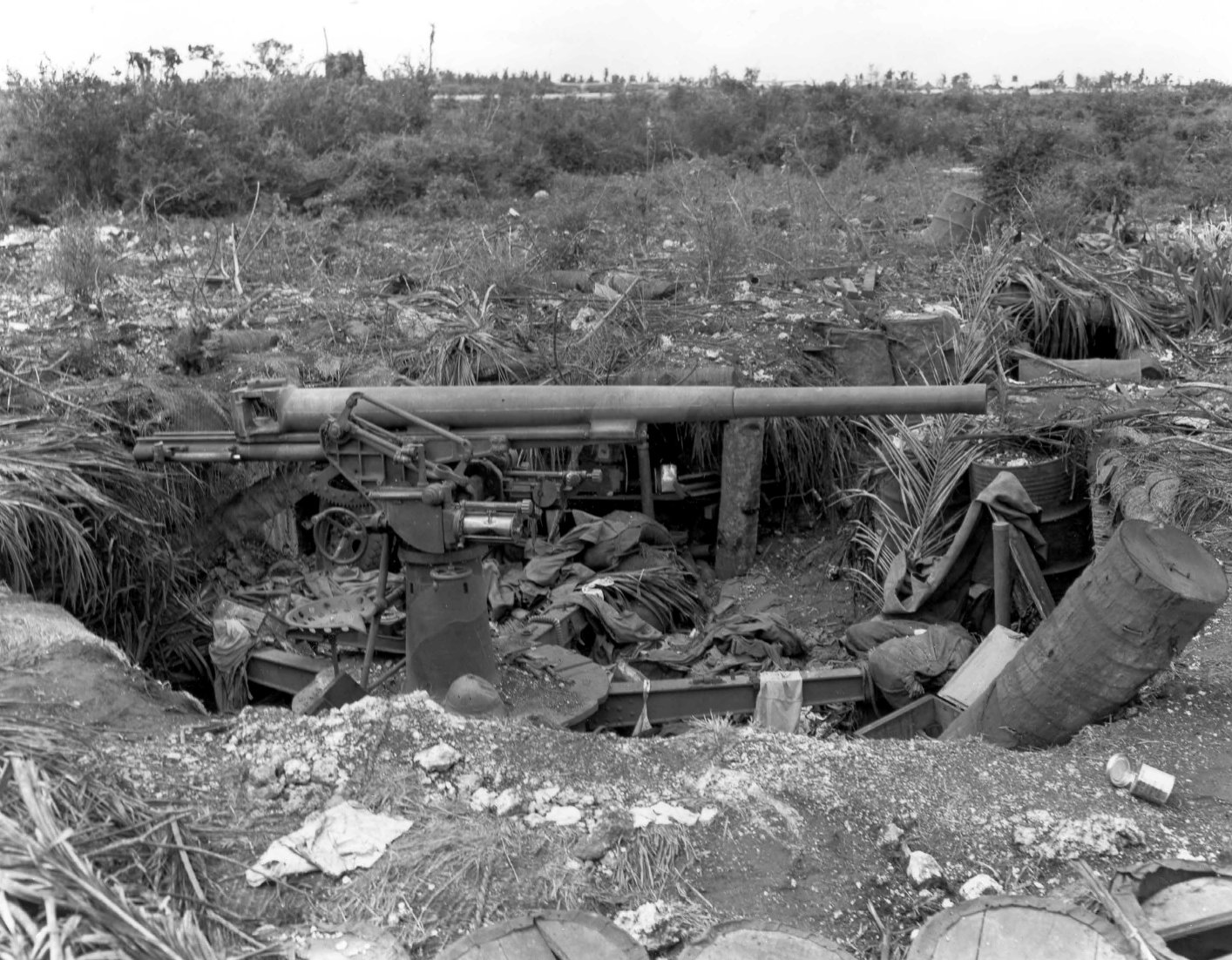
Japanese 75mm anti-aircraft gun.

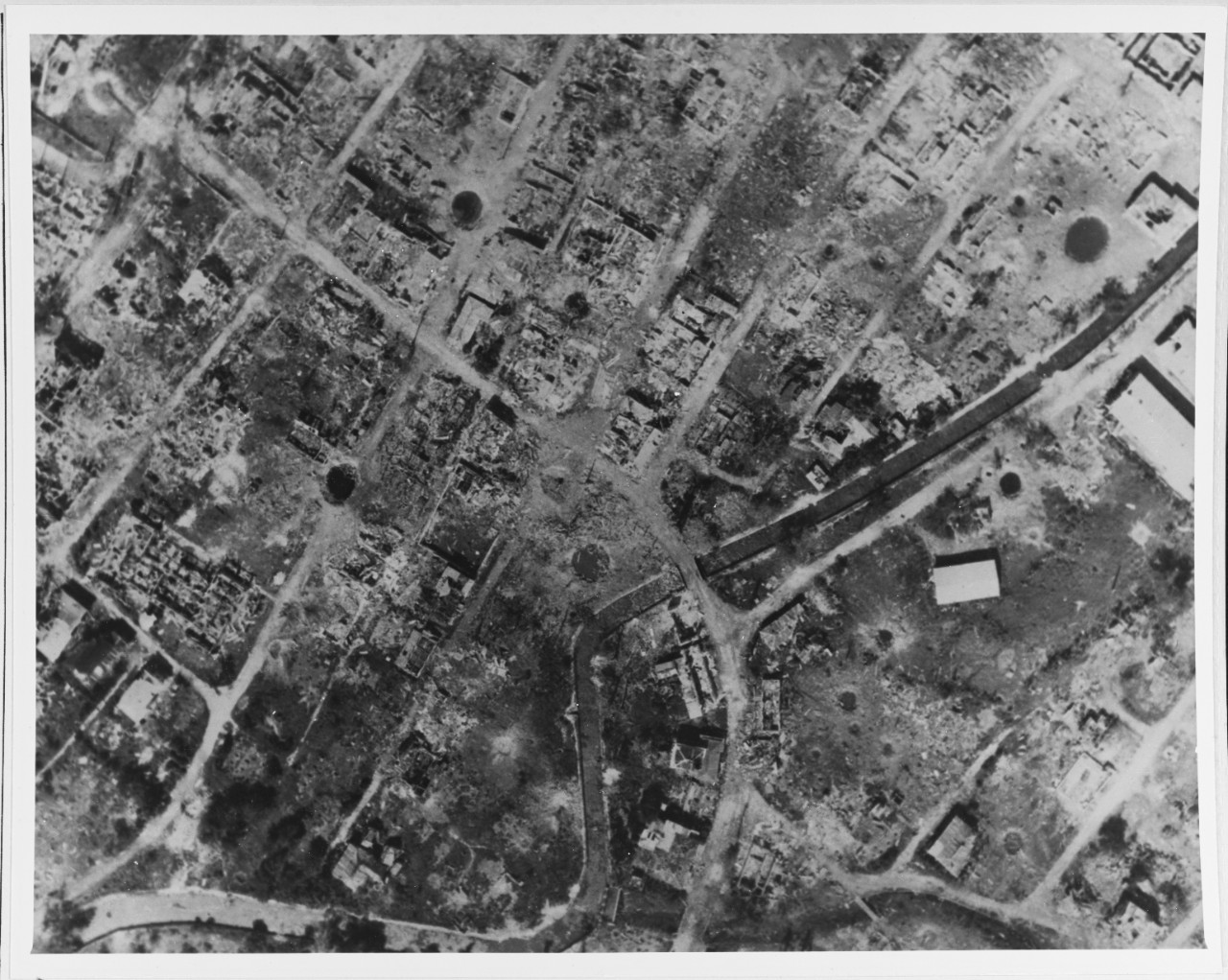
The village of Hagåtña, Guam after more than a month of bombardment.jpg.

3rd Marine Division (20,338 officers and enlisted)
Major General Allen H. Turnage (Note: Served as Assistant Commandant of the Marine Corps after the war.)
Asst. Div. Cmdr.: Brigadier General Alfred H. Noble

Chief of Staff: Colonel Ray A. Robinson
Personnel Officer (D-1): Lieutenant Colonel Chevey S. White (KIA 22 Jul), Major Irving R. Kriendler
Intelligence Officer (D-2): Lieutenant Colonel Howard J. Turton (to 28 Jul), Lieutenant Colonel Ellsworth N. Murray
Operations Officer (D-3): Colonel James A. Stuart (to 28 Jul), Lieutenant Colonel Howard J. Turton
Logistics Officer (D-4): Lieutenant Colonel Ellsworth N. Murray (to 28 Jul), Colonel William C. Hall

Left Sector (Red Beaches):

3rd Marine Regiment
Colonel William C. Hall (to 28 Jul), Colonel James A. Stuart
Exec. Ofc.: Colonel James D. Snedeker

1st Battalion

CO: Major Henry Aplington, II
XO: Major John A. Ptak (KIA 1 Aug)

2nd Battalion

CO: Lieutenant Colonel Hector de Zayas (KIA 26 Jul), Major William A. Culpepper
XO: Major William A. Culpepper (to 26 Jul), Major Howard J. Smith

CMoH recipient: PFC Leonard F. Mason (KIA 22 Jul)

3rd Battalion

CO: Lieutenant Colonel Ralph L. Houser (WIA 22 Jul), Major Royal R. Bastian
XO: Major Royal R. Bastian (to 23 Jul), Captain William R. Bradley

CMoH recipient: PFC Luther Skaggs Jr.

Center Sector (Green Beach):

21st Marine Regiment
Colonel Arthur H. Butler
Exec. Ofc.: Lieutenant Colonel Ernest W. Fry Jr.

1st Battalion

CO: Lieutenant Colonel Marlowe C. Williams
XO: Lieutenant Colonel Ronald R. Van Stockum

2nd Battalion

CO: Lieutenant Colonel Eustace R. Smoak
XO: Major Lowell E. English

3rd Battalion

CO: Lieutenant Colonel Wendell H. Duplantis
XO: Major Edward A. Clark

Right Sector (Blue Beaches):

9th Marine Regiment
Colonel Edward A. Craig
Exec. Ofc.: Lieutenant Colonel Jaime Sabater (WIA 21 Jul), Lieutenant Colonel Ralph M. King

1st Battalion

CO: Lieutenant Colonel Carey A. Randall
XO: Major Harold C. Boehm

CMoH recipient: PFC Frank P. Witek (KIA 3 Aug)

2nd Battalion

CO: Lieutenant Colonel Robert E. Cushman, Jr.
XO: Major William T. Glass

CMoH recipient: Captain Louis H. Wilson Jr. (Note: Served as Commandant of the Marine Corps, 1975-1979)

3rd Battalion

CO: Lieutenant Colonel Walter Asmuth, Jr. (WIA 21 Jul), Major Donald B. Hubbard (WIA 1 Aug), Major Jess P. Ferrill, Jr.
XO: Major Donald B. Hubbard (to 22 Jul), Captain Calvin W. Kunz, Jr.

Landed after W-Day:

12th Marine Regiment (Artillery)
Colonel John B. Wilson
Exec. Ofc.: Lieutenant Colonel John S. Letcher

1st Battalion

CO: Lieutenant Colonel Raymond F. Crist Jr. (WIA 22 Jul)
XO: Major George B. Thomas

2nd Battalion

CO: Lieutenant Colonel Donald M. Weller
XO: Mj. Henry E. W. Barnes

3rd Battalion

CO: Lieutenant Colonel Alpha L. Bowser
XO: Major Claude S. Sanders, Jr.

4th Battalion

CO: Lieutenant Colonel Bernard H. Kirk (WIA 21 Jul)
XO: Major Thomas R. Belzer

19th Marine Regiment (Engineer)
Lieutenant Colonel Robert E. Fojt
Exec. Ofc.: Lieutenant Colonel Edmund M. Williams

1st Battalion

CO: Lieutenant Colonel Walter S. Campbell
XO: Major Virgil M. Davis

2nd Battalion

CO: Major Victor J. Simpson
XO: Major Howard A. Hurst

Other units

3rd Medical Battalion (Cmdr. Raymond R. Callaway, USN)
3rd Motor Transport Battalion (Lieutenant Colonel Thomas R. Stokes)
3rd Service Battalion (Lieutenant Colonel Durant S. Buchanan)
3rd Tank Battalion (Lieutenant Colonel Hartnoll J. Withers)
25th Naval Construction Battalion (Lieutenant Cmdr. George J. Whelan, USN)

==== Southern landing area (South of Orote Peninsula) ====
Southern sector commanders

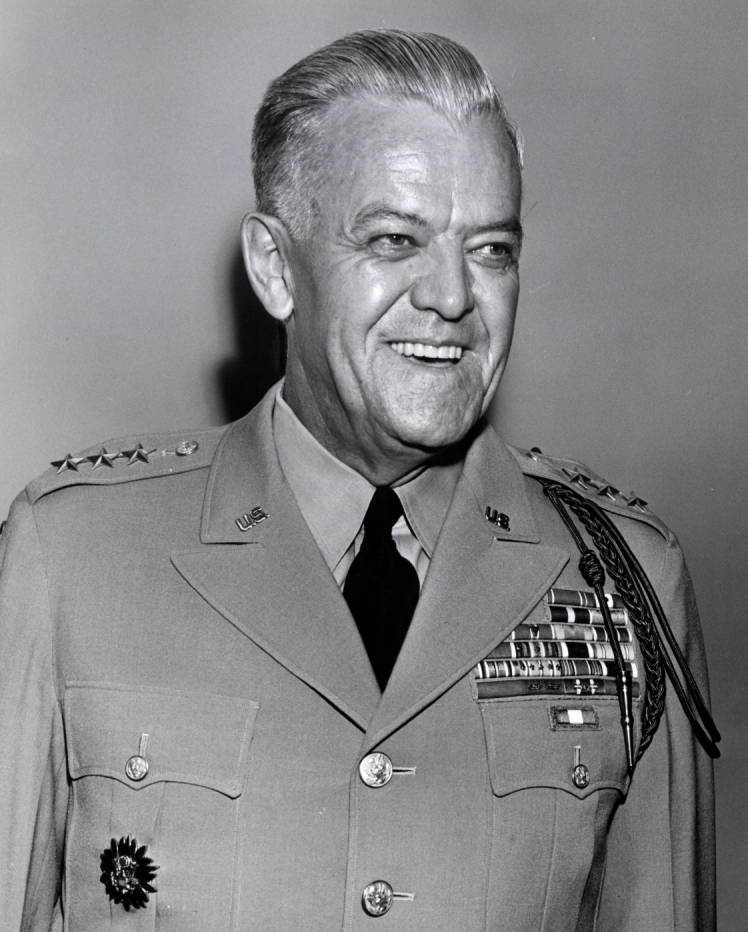
Andrew D. Bruce as a lieutenant general

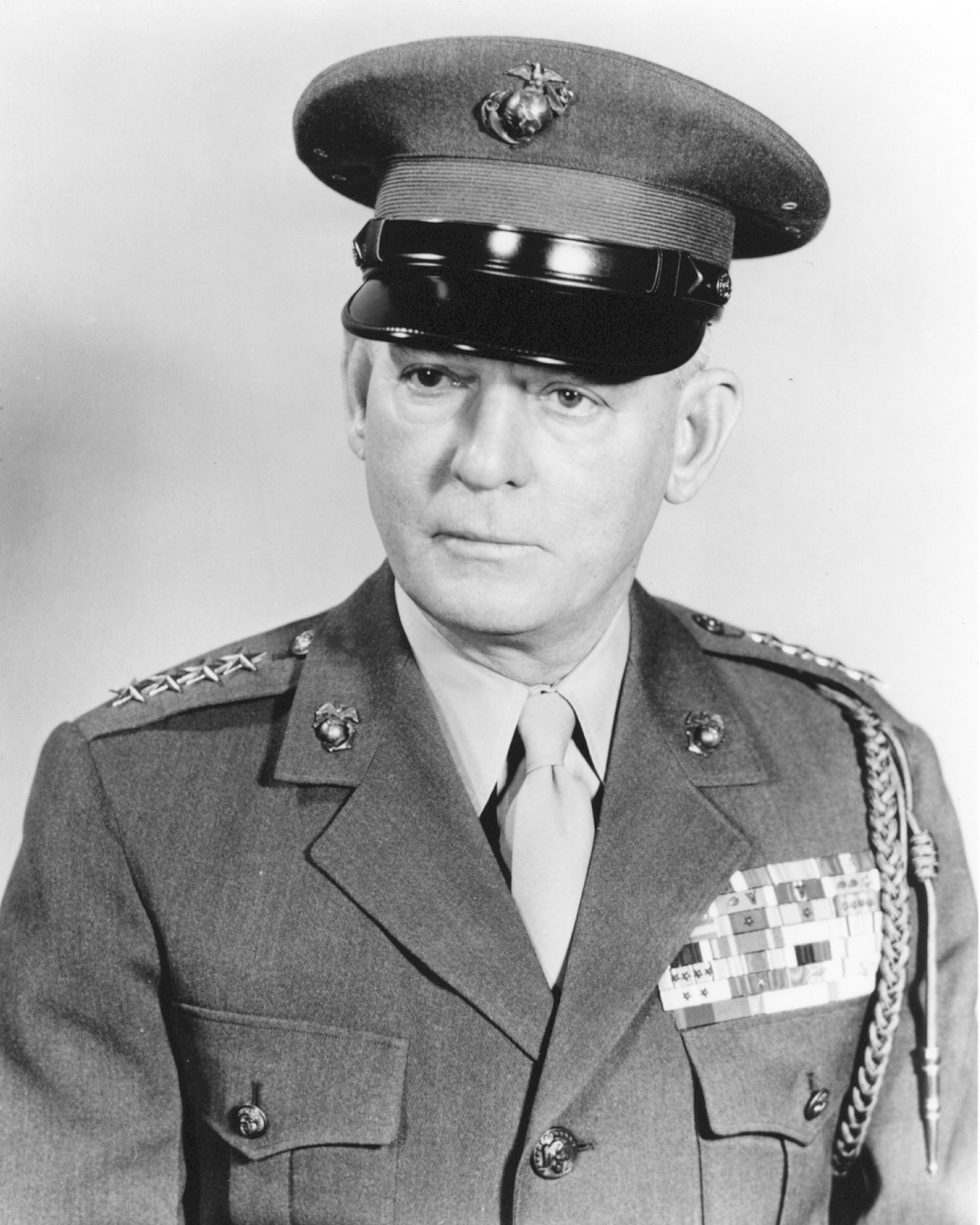
Lemuel C. Shepherd as Commandant of the Marine Corps

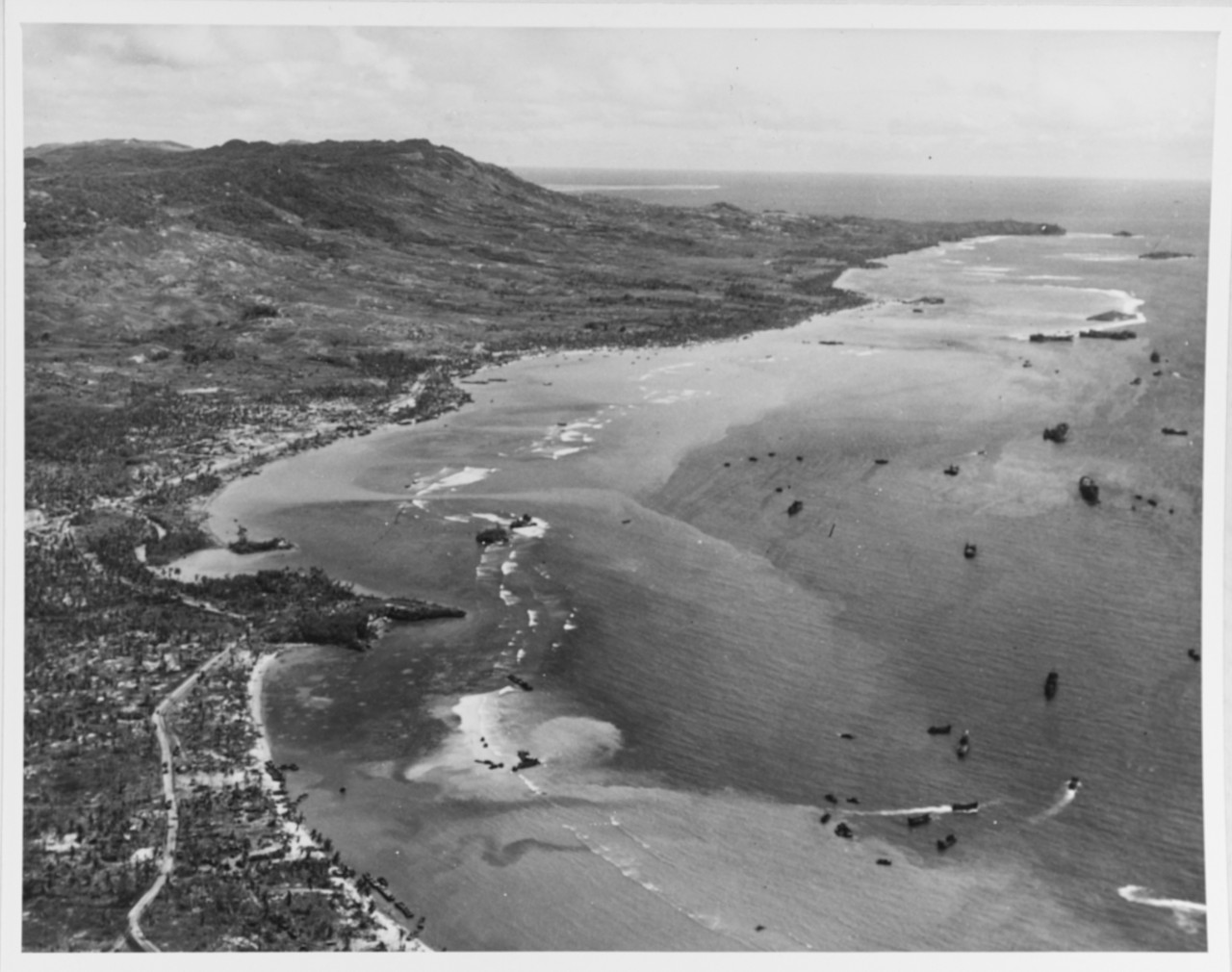
Landings by the 77th Inf. Div. and 1st Prov. Marine Brigade south of Agat.

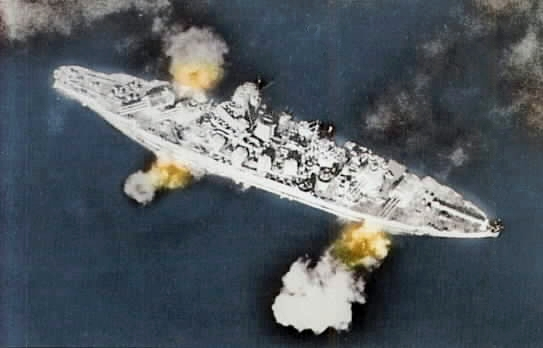
Battleship Pennsylvania bombarding Guam south of Orote Peninsula

Left beaches:

77th Infantry ("Statue of Liberty") Division (Army) (17,958 officers and enlisted) (Note: Less 305th RCT which was attached to the 1st Provisional Marine Brigade for this operation.)
Major General Andrew D. Bruce, USA (Note: Commanded 77th Division again during the capture of the island of Ie Shima during the Okinawa campaign.)
Asst. Div. Cmdr.: Brigadier General Edwin H. Randle, USA

CO, Divisional Artillery: Brigadier General Isaac Spalding, USA
Chief of Staff: Colonel Douglas C. McNair (KIA 6 August) (Note: Son of Lieutenant General Leslie J. McNair who had been killed by errant Allied bombs in France 12 days earlier.); Lieutenant Colonel Guy V. Miller (from 6 August)

306th Regimental Combat Team
307th Regimental Combat Team

Right beaches:

1st Provisional Marine Brigade (9,886 officers and enlisted)
Brigadier General Lemuel C. Shepherd Jr. (Note: Served as Commandant of the Marine Corps from 1952 through 1955.)
Chief of Staff: Colonel John T. Walker

Personnel Officer (B-1): Major Addison B. Overstreet
Intelligence Officer (B-2): Major Robert W. Shaw
Operations Officer (B-3): Lieutenant Colonel Thomas A. Culhane, Jr.
Logistics Officer (B-4): Lieutenant Colonel August Larson

Northern portion (Yellow Beaches):

22nd Marine Regiment

Colonel Merlin F. Schneider
Exec. Ofc.: Lieutenant Colonel William J. Wise

1st Battalion

CO: Lieutenant Colonel Walfried H. Fromhold (to 31 Jul), Major Crawford B. Lawton
XO: Major Crawford B. Lawton (to 1 Aug), Major William E. Sperling, III

2nd Battalion

CO: Lieutenant Colonel Donn C. Hart (to 27 Jul), Major John F. Schoettel (WIA 27 Jul)
XO: Major Robert P. Felker

3rd Battalion

CO: Lieutenant Colonel Clair W. Shisler (WIA 27 Jul)
XO: Major Earl J. Cook

Southern portion (White Beaches):

4th Marine Regiment

Lieutenant Colonel Alan Shapley
Exec. Ofc.: Lieutenant Colonel Samuel D. Puller (KIA 27 Jul), Captain Charles T. Lamb

1st Battalion

CO: Major Bernard W. Green
XO: Major Robert S. Wade (temp. atchd.)

2nd Battalion

CO: Major John S. Messer
XO: Major Roy S. Batterton, Jr. (WIA 21 Jul), Captain Lincoln N. Holdzcom

3rd Battalion

CO: Major Hamilton M. Hoyler
XO: Major Hugh J. Chapman

UDTs 3 and 4

Floating reserve:

305th Regimental Combat Team (Army) (detached from 77th Inf. Div.)

Commanding Officer: Colonel V.J. Tanzola, USA

Other units:

9th Defense Battalion (Lieutenant Colonel Archie E. O'Neil)
14th Defense Battalion (Lieutenant Colonel William F. Parks)

=== Guam Island command ===
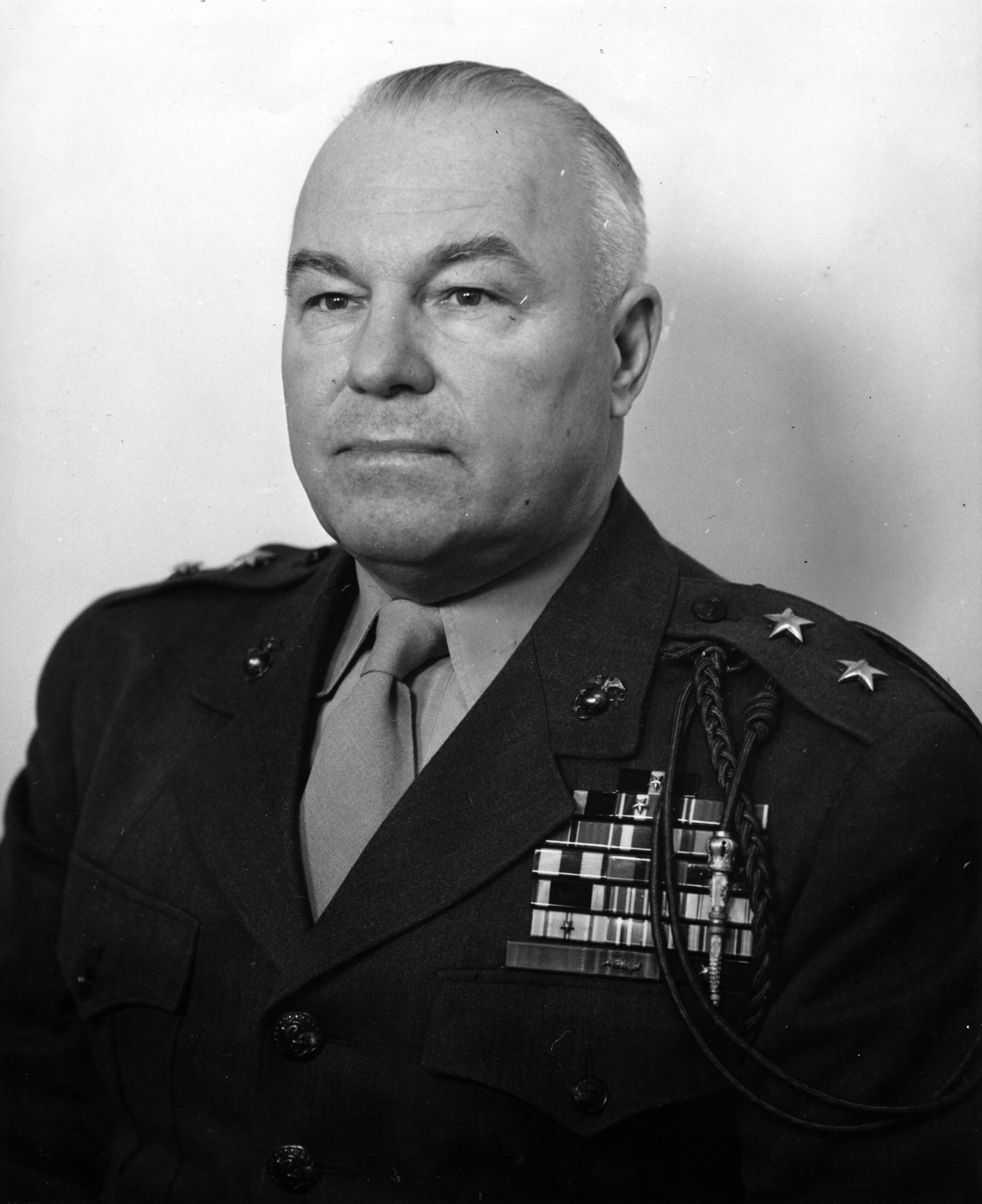
Major General Henry L. Larsen, USMC

Major General Henry L. Larsen (Note: Served as Governor of Guam after the war.)

Chief of Staff: Colonel Robert Blake

Personnel Officer (A-1): Colonel Lee N. Utz
Intelligence Officer (A-2): Colonel Francis H. Brink
Operations Officer (A-3): Colonel Benjamin W. Atkinson (to 8 Aug), Lieutenant Colonel Shelton C. Zern
Logistics Officer (A-4): Colonel James A. Mixson
Plans Officer (A-5): Colonel Charles I. Murray

1st Provisional Base Headquarters Battalion
Lieutenant Colonel Victor A. Barraco

Headquarters Company: 1st Lieutenant Emerson S. Clark, Jr.
Military Police Company: Captain Paul J. Swartz

5th Field Depot
Lieutenant Colonel Walter A. Churchill

Executive Officer: Lieutenant Colonel Patrick J. Haltigan, Jr.
Operations Officer: Major John W. Allen

== Japanese forces ==
Japanese commanders on Guam

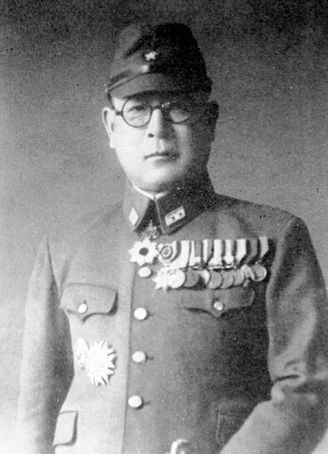
Lt. Gen. Takeshi Takashina

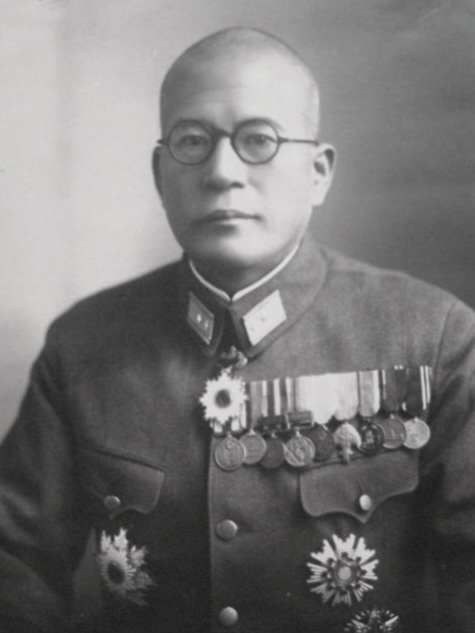
Lt. Gen. Hideyoshi Obata

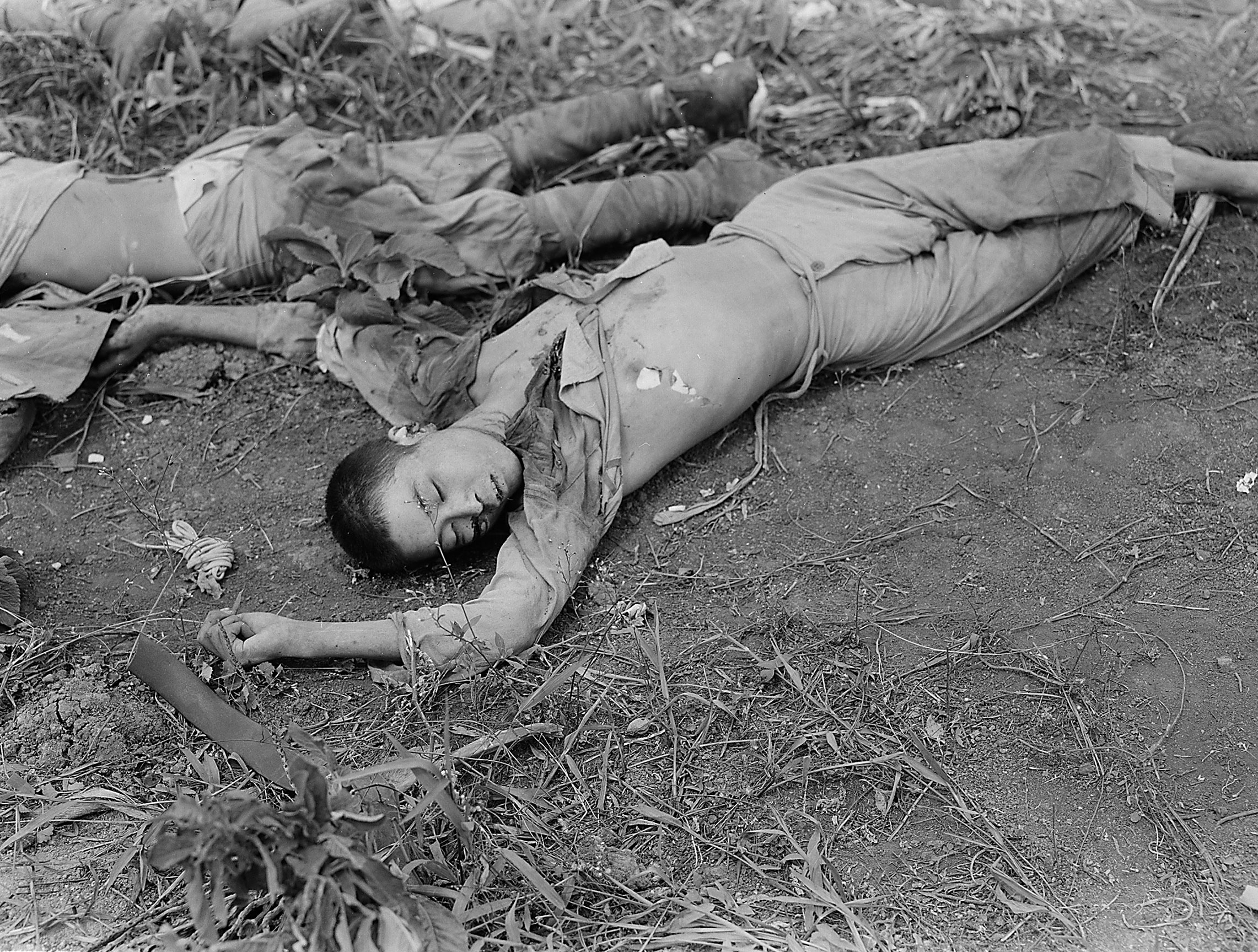
Dead Japanese soldiers on Guam.

Overall command
Lt. Gen. Takeshi Takashina (KIA 28 July)

Thirty-First Army (Note: A Japanese army was equivalent to a Euro-American corps.)
Lt. Gen. Hideyoshi Obata (seppuku 11 August)
Approx. 19,000 officers and enlisted

29th Division (Lt. Gen. Takashina)

18th Infantry Regiment
38th Infantry Regiment

1st Tank Division

9th Tank Regiment

48th Independent Brigade
10th Independent Mixed Regiment

6th Expeditionary Force
Maj. Gen. Kiyoshi Shigematsu (KIA 26 July)

319th, 321st, 322nd, 820th Independent Infantry Battalions

Navy Land Units
Navy Air Service

Additional air defense, engineer, signals, etc., support elements

== Bibliography ==
- Clark, George B. (2006). The Six Marine Divisions in the Pacific: Every Campaign of World War II. Jefferson, North Carolina: McFarland and Co. ISBN 978-0-7864-2769-7.
- Morison, Samuel Eliot (1953). New Guinea and the Marianas, March 1944 – August 1944. History of United States Naval Operations in World War II. Vol. VIII. Boston: Little, Brown and Co. LCCN 53-7298.
- Rottman, Gordon L. (2004). Guam 1941 & 1944: Loss and reconquest. Oxford: Osprey Publishing Ltd. ISBN 978-1-84176-811-3.
