= DuPage =

DuPage may refer to:

- DuPage County, Illinois
- DuPage Township, Will County, Illinois
- DuPage River
- DuPage Airport
- College of DuPage
- USS DuPage
