= A. Al Moore =

American football player (1915–1991)

Al Moore
Profile
- Position: Defensive end

Personal information
- Born: June 18, 1915; Sunset, Texas, U.S.
- Died: July 28, 1991 (aged 76); Jackson, Oregon, U.S.
- Listed height: 6 ft 2 in (1.88 m)
- Listed weight: 218 lb (99 kg)

Career information
- College: Texas A&M

Career history
- Green Bay Packers (1939)

Awards and highlights
- NFL champion (1939)
- Stats at Pro Football Reference

Audrey Allen "Sousie" Moore (June 18, 1915 – July 28, 1991) was an American football defensive end in the National Football League (NFL). Moore came out of Texas A&M to join the Green Bay Packers in 1939, playing five games for the Packers, including the winning 1939 NFL championships. At Texas A&M, Moore played the sousaphone tuba, earning him the nickname "Sousie."

Moore was drafted to the U.S. Navy in 1940 and stationed on the USS Pennsylvania based in San Diego, California, where he met Marie Darrieulat. They were married on January 28, 1940, before the USS Pennsylvania was deployed to the Pacific theater of World War II.

After the war, the Moores settled in the Los Angeles, California area and raised three daughters, Lynne, Suzanne and Kathleen.
