= Gunston Hall (disambiguation) =

Gunston Hall is the historic home of George Mason, located in Virginia, United States.

Gunston Hall may also refer to:

- Gunston Hall (Biltmore Forest, North Carolina), an historic estate
- Gunston Hall School, a defunct women's finishing school in Washington, D.C.
- USS Gunston Hall (LSD-5), an Ashland-class dock landing ship, launched in 1943 and struck in 1970
- USS Gunston Hall (LSD-44), a Whidbey Island-class dock landing ship, launched in 1987
- SS Gunston Hall, a Design 1015 steel-hulled cargo ship built in 1919

== See also ==
- USS Gunston Hall (disambiguation)
