= USS Harrison =

USS Harrison may refer to:

- USS Harrison (1761), was a schooner chartered for the Continental Navy in 1775 and decommissioned in 1776
- USS Harrison (DD-573), was a Fletcher-class destroyer launched in 1942 and transferred to Mexico in 1968
