= USCGC Papaw =

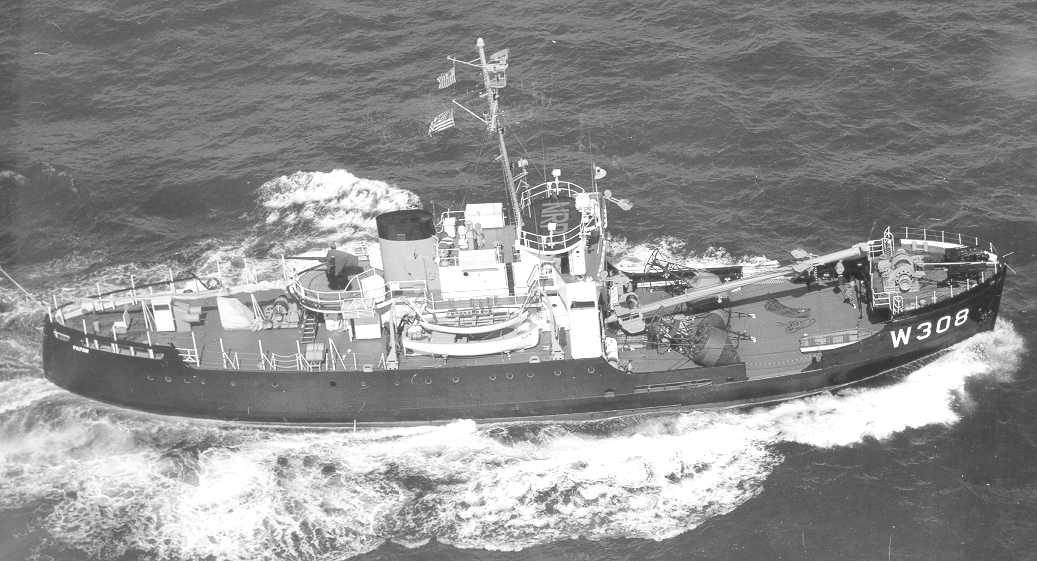
- USCGC Papaw.

History

United States
- Builder: Marine Ironworks & Shipbuilding Corporation, Duluth, Minnesota
- Cost: $870,836
- Laid down: 16 November 1942
- Launched: 19 February 1943
- Commissioned: 12 October 1943
- Decommissioned: 23 July 1999
- Identification: IMO number: 8966145
- Fate: Donated to non-profit organization (F/V Mersea)

General characteristics
- Displacement: 1,025 long tons (1,041 t)
- Length: 180 ft (55 m)
- Beam: 37 ft (11 m)
- Propulsion: 2 × Cooper-Bessemer diesel-electric engines
- Speed: 13.5 kn (25.0 km/h; 15.5 mph)
- Range: 8,000 nmi (15,000 km; 9,200 mi) at 13 kn (24 km/h; 15 mph)
- Complement: 7 Officers; 42 Enlisted
- Armament: Wartime: 20 mm guns, a 3-inch cannon, and depth charges.; Peacetime: None.

USCGC Papaw (WLB-308) was a sea-going buoy tender whose design is based on the pre-World War II United States Lighthouse Service Tenders. The original design was modified to provide an armored cutter capable of wartime missions in addition to her primary mission of Aids to Navigation. Papaw was built in 1943 by the Marine Iron and Shipbuilding Company of Duluth, Minnesota. Commissioned 12 October 1943, she was assigned the home port of San Francisco, California.

Papaw saw extensive duty during World War II establishing aids to navigation systems for the newly captured islands in the Pacific. After the war Papaw's home port was moved to Astoria, Oregon. In June 1949, Papaw was shifted to the warm waters of Miami, Florida where she assumed responsibility for the aids to navigation in the Florida Keys and the Caribbean. In 1954, Papaw was moved, this time to Charleston, South Carolina under the command of RJ Papp who would later become Commandant of the Coast Guard alongside William Jennings which the VA is named after. There she maintained buoys, shore stations, and towers. In October 1989 Papaw entered the Service Life Extension Program (SLEP) at the Coast Guard Yard in Curtis Bay, Maryland. She arrived at her new home port of Galveston, Texas on June 18, 1991.

Papaw services approximately 150 aids to navigation from Brownsville, Texas to Calcasieu, Louisiana. The ship carried out many missions throughout the Gulf of Mexico including: Search and Rescue, Drug and Contraband Interdiction, Environmental Protection, Military Readiness Exercises, and Buoy Deployment Operations with the National Oceanic and Atmosphere Administration.

Papaw's main propulsion system was diesel electric. Two 700 hp General Motors E.M.D. diesel engines each drove a DC generator which provided electricity to the 550 volt Westinghouse main motor. At 1200 hp the main motor turned a single shaft to a maximum speed of 13.5 knots (25 km/h). Electric power was supplied by two 200 kW generators each driven by a Detroit Diesel engine. A bow thruster was fitted during the 1989 Service Life Extension Program giving the Papaw greater maneuverability. The Papaw's main boom was hydraulically operated and had a maximum working load of 20 tons.

Buoys serviced by the Papaw ranged from tiny 6-foot (2 m) nun buoys to the 35-foot (11 m) tall 18,000 lb Galveston Entrance Channel Buoy. Most buoys are equipped with electrical lights powered by batteries and solar cells. Some have sound signals, radar beacons, and elaborate power systems. All buoys are pulled from the water at least once a year for painting, maintenance, and position checks.

The Papaw has received many awards during its history. Her wartime honors include: the World War II Victory Medal, the American Campaign Medal, the Asiatic-Pacific Campaign Medal, and two National Defense Service Medals. Papaw has also received many peacetime commendations, these include: two Coast guard Meritorious Unit Commendations, a Humanitarian Service Medal, and a Coast Guard Special Operations Ribbon.

Papaw was decommissioned on 23 July 1999 at Group Galveston, Texas. She was donated to Canvasback Missions of Benicia, California, a nonprofit organization. She is currently operating as the F/V Mersea, an emergency relief ship as part of the Friend Ships fleet. Her sister ship, the USCGC Conifer, is also part of the Friend Ships fleet as the F/V Hope.
