= USS Hydrographer =

USS Hydrographer may refer to the following ships of the United States Navy:

- USS Hydrographer (1917), was a wooden steam launch built in 1901 and came under US Navy jurisdiction in 1917. She continued her surveying duties in the Gulf of Mexico and was returned to the Coast and Geodetic Survey 1 April 1919
- USS Hydrographer (AGS-2), was a survey ship acquired by the US Navy in April 1942 and decommissioned 1 July 1946
