= USS Wichita =

Three ships of the United States Navy have been named USS Wichita, after the city of Wichita, Kansas.

- USS Wichita (CA-45) was a heavy cruiser in service from in 1939 to 1947 and active during World War II.
- USS Wichita (AOR-1) was a replenishment oiler in service from 1969 to 1993.
- USS Wichita (LCS-13) is a Freedom-class littoral combat ship launched in 2016.
