= USS Beagle =

USS Beagle may refer to the following ships of the United States Navy:

- USS Beagle (1822)
- USS Beagle (IX-112)
