= USS Grapple =

Two ships in the United States Navy have been named USS Grapple.

- USS Grapple (ARS-7), commissioned in 1943, struck in 1977 and sold to Taiwan.
- USS Grapple (ARS-53), commissioned in 1985. in active service.
