= USS DuPage =

USS DuPage may refer to:

- USS DuPage (AP-86) launched in 1942 as Sea Hound (AP-86), reclassified as USS DuPage (APA-41), a Bayfield-class attack transport, and decommissioned in 1946.
- USS DuPage (APB-51) a self-propelled barracks ship which operated in a noncommissioned status in the Pacific area during 1951–59.
