= USS Lackawanna =

Two ships of the United States Navy have been named USS Lackawanna:

- USS Lackawanna (1862) was a sloop-of-war launched 9 August 1862 and sold on 30 July 1887
- USS Lackawanna (AO-40), was an oiler acquired by the US Navy 20 June 1942 and decommissioned 14 February 1946
