= USS Elk =

USS Elk is a name used more than once by the U.S. Navy:

- USS Elk (1863), a Civil War gunboat commissioned 6 May 1864.
- USS Elk (IX-115), a tanker, was launched 6 November 1943 by California Shipbuilding Corp., Wilmington, California.
