= USS Skylark =

USS Skylark may refer to the following ships of the United States Navy:

- USS Skylark (AM-63), an Auk-class minesweeper, launched in 1942. On 28 April 1945, she struck a mine off Okinawa, and sank.
- USS Skylark (ASR-20), a Penguin-class submarine rescue ship. Fleet tug Yustaga (ATF-165) was redesignated and renamed Skylark (ASR-20) on 7 November 1945. Decommissioned in June 1973, Skylark was sold to Brazil, in whose navy she served under the name Gastao Moutinho until about 1988.
