= USS Murray =

USS Murray has been the name of more than one United States Navy ship, and may refer to:

- USS Murray (SP-1438), a patrol boat in commission from 1917 to 1918
- USS Murray (DD-97), a Wickes-class destroyer in commission from 1918 to 1936
- USS Murray (DD-576), was a Fletcher-class destroyer in commission from 1943 to 1965
