= USS Warren =

USS Warren may refer to the following ships of the United States Navy:

- USS Warren (1775), was a schooner commissioned in 1775; destroyed in 1776
- USS Warren (1776), was a frigate commissioned in 1776 and burned in 1779 to prevent capture
- USS Warren (1799), was a sloop-of-war commissioned in 1799 and sold in 1801
- USS Warren (1827), was a sloop-of-war commissioned in 1827 and sold in 1863
- USS Warren (APA-53), was a transport ship launched in 1943 and decommissioned in 1946

== See also ==
- USAT Warren, was a U.S. Army transport (USAT) 1898–1922.
