= USS Selfridge =

USS Selfridge is the name of two ships in the United States Navy.

- USS Selfridge (DD-320), a Clemson-class destroyer which served after World War I until 1930.
- USS Selfridge (DD-357), a Porter-class destroyer which served in World War II and was involved in the Attack on Pearl Harbor.
