= USS Monongahela =

USS Monongahela may refer to the following ships of the United States Navy:

- USS Monongahela (1862), was launched in 1862 and served during the American Civil War
- USS Monongahela (AO-42), was an oiler acquired by the US Navy in July 1942 and decommissioned August 1957
- USS Monongahela (AO-178), was an oiler launched in 1979 and decommissioned in 1999
