= USS Holly =

USS Holly is a name used more than once by the U.S. Navy:

- USS Holly (1881), acquired by the US Navy in 1917 for service during World War I
- USS Holly (AN-19), a net laying ship placed in service at Algiers, Louisiana, 11 October 1941

== See also ==
- USS Augustus Holly, a schooner purchased in 1861.
- USLHT Holly (1881), a wood and steel lighthouse tender built in 1881.
