= USS Argonne =

USS Argonne may refer to one of two United States Navy vessels:

- USS Argonne (1918), built in 1916 at Kobe, Japan, by the Kawasaki Dockyards.
- USS Argonne (AS-10), originally designated AP-4 and commissioned 8 November 1921.
