= USS Swallow =

USS Swallow is a name used more than once by the United States Navy:

- USS Swallow (AM-4) was laid down at New York City on 18 March 1918.
- USS Swallow (AM-65) was laid down on 19 July 1941 at Alameda, California.
- USS Swallow (AMS-36), a minesweeper commissioned on 22 June 1944.
