= USS Boreas =

Cargo ship of the United States Navy

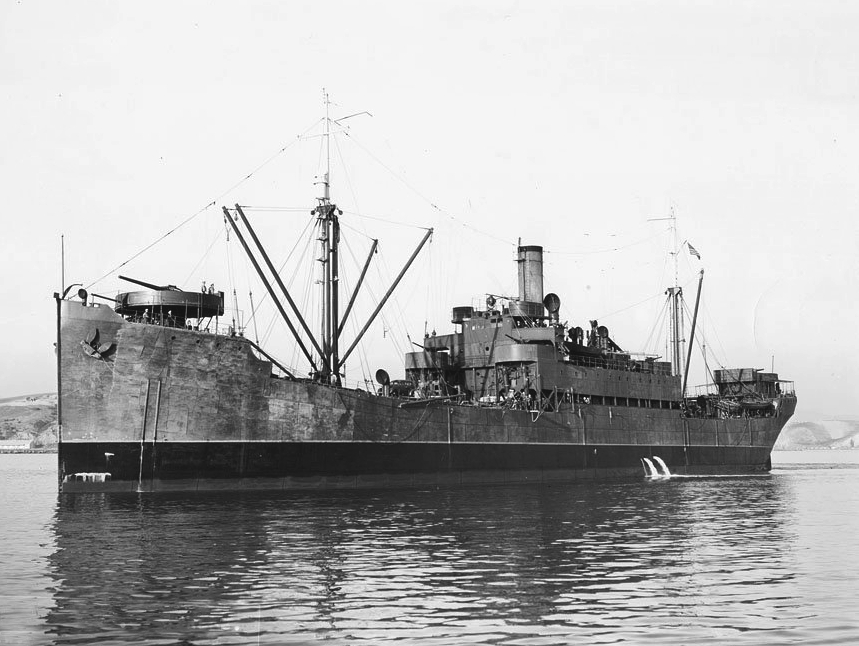
- USS Boreas (AF-8) in October 1941

History

United States
- Name: USS Boreas
- Builder: Moore Shipbuilding, Oakland, California
- Launched: 1919, as SS Yaquina
- Acquired: 6 December 1921
- Commissioned: 6 August 1940
- Decommissioned: 15 February 1946
- Stricken: 28 March 1946
- Fate: Scrapped, 28 November 1947

General characteristics
- Class & type: Arctic-class stores ship
- Displacement: 4,654 long tons (4,729 t) light; 11,570 long tons (11,760 t) full
- Length: 416 ft 6 in (126.95 m)
- Beam: 53 ft (16 m)
- Draft: 26 ft 5 in (8.05 m)
- Installed power: 2,800 shp (2,100 kW)
- Propulsion: 1 × geared turbine; 1 × shaft
- Speed: 11 kn (13 mph; 20 km/h)
- Complement: 267
- Armament: 2 × 5 in (130 mm)/51 cal guns, 4 × 3 in (76 mm)/50 cal dual purpose guns, 8 × 20 mm anti-aircraft cannons

USS Boreas (AF-8) was an Arctic-class stores ship acquired by the United States Navy after World War I. She served with distinction during World War II, supplying food and other supplies to ships and installations in the combat zones of the Pacific Theater.

== Early career ==
Boreas was built for the United States Shipping Board as SS Yaquina in 1919 at Oakland, California, by the Moore Shipbuilding Company; renamed Boreas on 29 October 1921; acquired by the Navy on 6 December 1921 and laid up in reserve at the Philadelphia Navy Yard; commissioned in ordinary on 6 August 1940; towed to the Todd-Robbins Dry Dock and Repair Company in Brooklyn, New York, for reactivation; and placed in full commission on 24 March 1941.

In May 1941, after commissioning, The USS Boreas proceeded to the Chesapeake Bay-Hampton Roads area for calibration, shakedown and her first load. At that time there was a definite shortage of ships in the United States Navy and considerable construction work was in progress at various U.S. Naval bases. As a result, all the ship loads, with the exception of No. 2 load, were loaded with construction equipment and material. Finally after a two- or three-day delay, the cargo for No. 2 Load had arrived – frozen turkeys from the state of Washington.

The USS Boreas started south on her first trip. A brief stop was made at Guantanamo Bay, Cuba, then through the Panama Canal, and finally docking in San Diego in California for another brief stop. Afterword, the USS Boreas set a course for Pearl Harbor in Hawaii. Upon her arrival, all construction equipment and material was unloaded and the USS Boreas then returned to San Diego. The total duration of the voyage took 57 days (9,337 miles). For the next few months, the USS Boreas operated as a shuttle service between these ports on the U.S. West Coast and Hawaii.

== World War II ==
At the time of the attack on Pearl Harbor on 7 December 1941, the USS Boreas was in San Francisco. She would be the first provisions ship to arrive at the stricken naval base in Hawaii after the attack. The ship made ten round-trips between San Francisco and Pearl Harbor in 1942 hauling goods and material to rebuild and resupply the strategic naval base.

On 26 December 1942, Boreas departed San Francisco, bound for Nouméa, New Caledonia, and Espiritu Santo, to begin supplying advanced bases. Returning to Pearl Harbor or San Francisco to refill her holds with needed supplies, Boreas provisioned many of the major islands and bases in the Pacific including Samoa; Funafuti; Kwajalein; Eniwetok; Tulagi; Guadalcanal; Guam; Saipan; Iwo Jima; Okinawa; Manus; Ulithi; Efate; Tarawa; Makin; Christmas Island; and Auckland, New Zealand.

Boreas generally steamed alone, only occasionally rating a small escort, but the store ship never suffered damage and rarely even saw an enemy. Late in 1944, she salvaged cargo from Asphalt, a concrete storage barge that had grounded on a coral reef off Saipan during a severe storm.

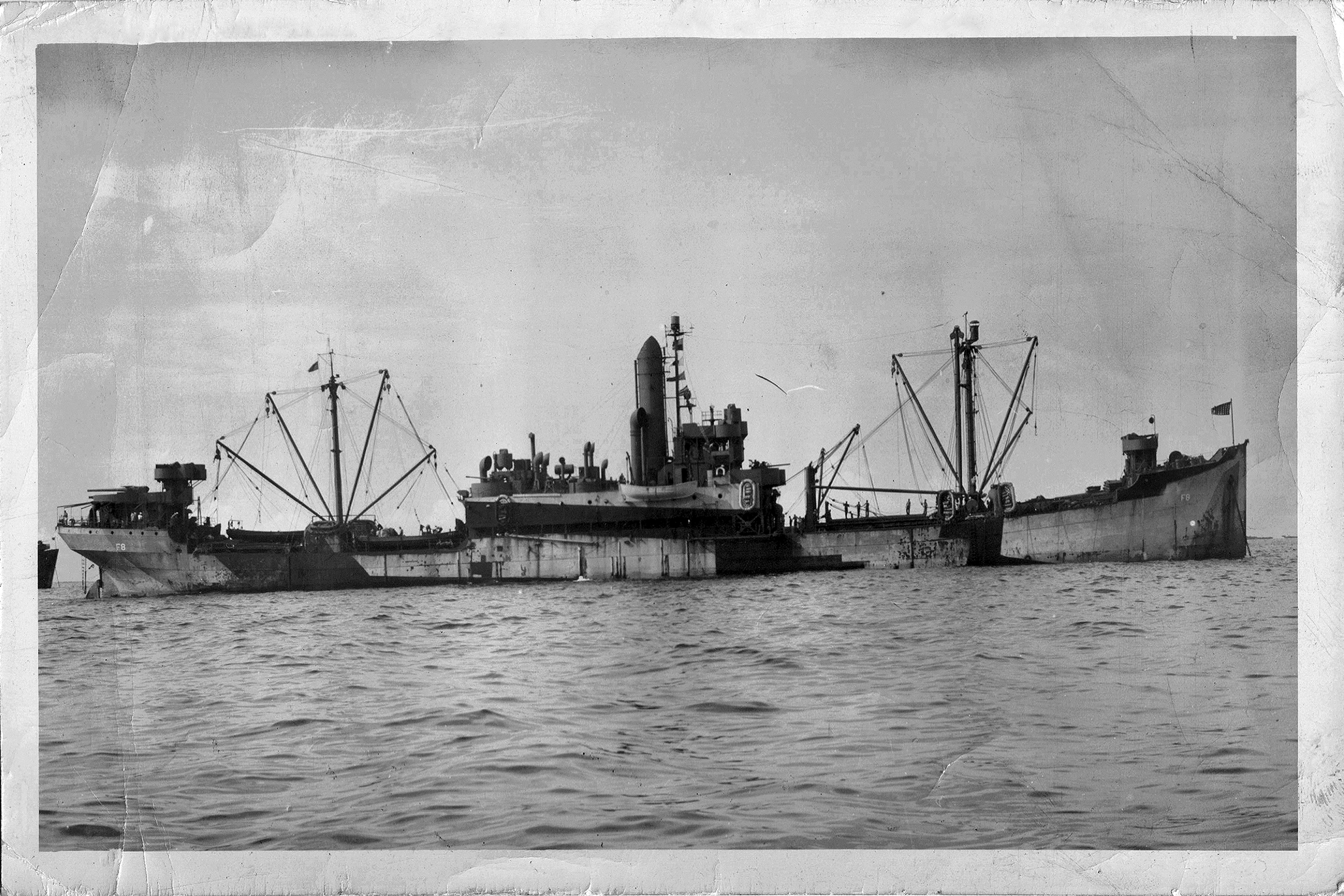
USS Boreas. Photograph by SC3 Barney Nowicki

The average load of the USS Boreas was valued at $917,280, with a maximum individual load value of $1,077,961 and a minimum individual load value of $688,001. The value of the Boreas cargo of fresh, frozen and dry stores for the entire period amounted to the sum total of $25,028,288. A further breakdown of cargo delivered reveals the following:

Item	Quantity	Value
Bacon	1,552,474 lbs.	$474,111.00
Beef	25,496,883 lbs.	$5,297,325.00
Butter	4,849,929 lbs.	$1,762,246.00
Cheese	1,340,118 lbs.	$327,871.00
Eggs	4,127,031 lbs	$1,753,823.00
Ham	5,215,824 lbs.	$1,639,064.00
Pork	5,083,965 lbs.	$1,167,932.00
Sausage	1,919,997 lbs.	$486,760.00
Lamb	6,291,909 lbs.	$1,013,019.00
Fowl	3,925,905 lbs.	$1,528,882.00
Veal	1,900,791 lbs.	$374,669.00
Miscellaneous, Frozen	5,131,956 lbs.	$1,252,021.00
Fruits, Fresh	20,882,538 lbs.	$1,390,395.00
Potatoes	31,531,362 lbs.	$967,974.00
Dry Stores	22,939,848 lbs.	$3,214,650.00
		$25,028,288.00

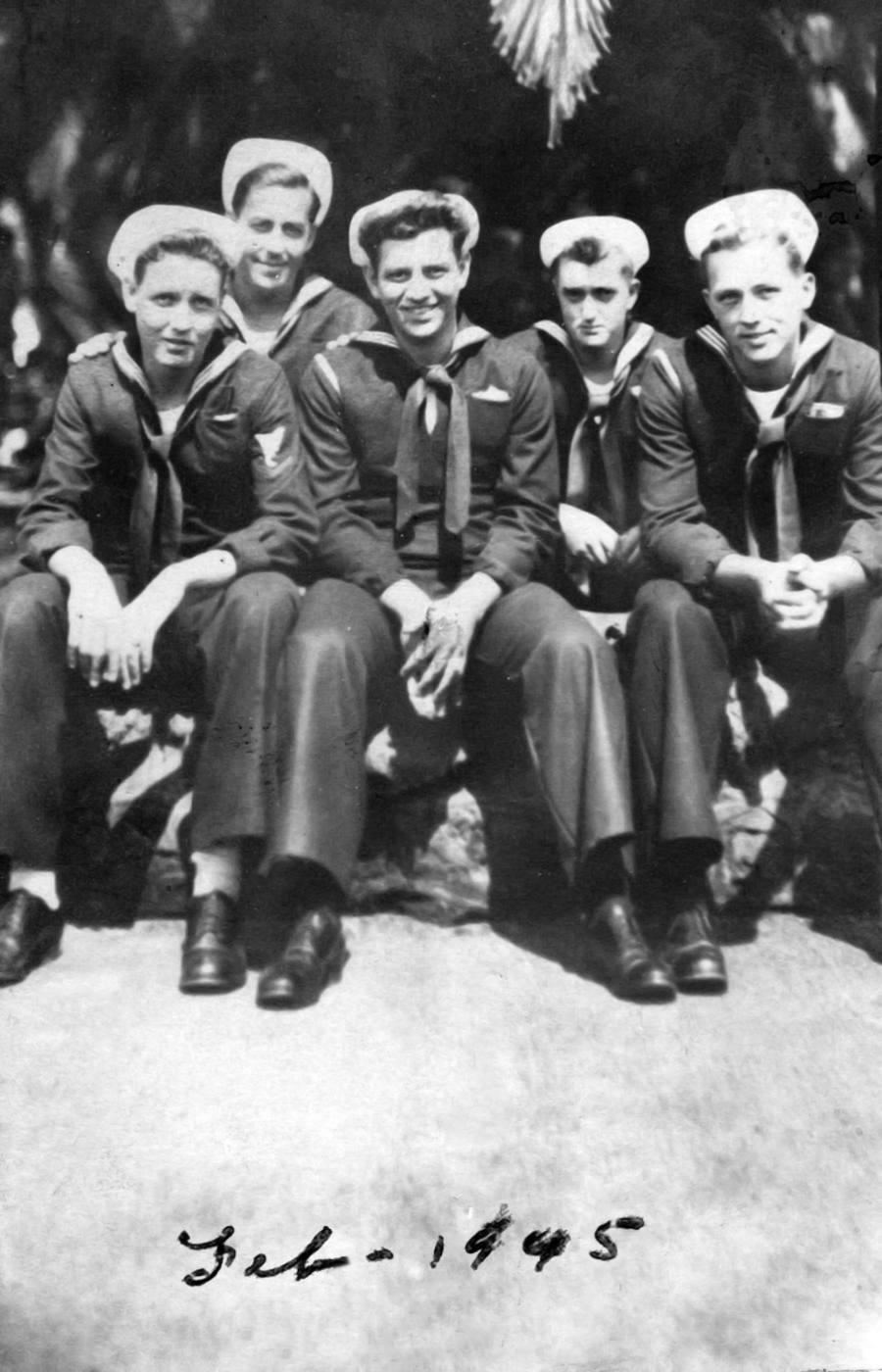
Sailors of USS Boreas in New Zealand, Feb 1945.

Auckland and New Zealand were the principal loading ports for the USS Boreas during the latter part of 1944 and 1945. It was because of this that the Boreas achieved the distinction of being the special friend of small craft and the "splinter fleet" at all bases.

The ship's store would purchase from three to five thousand gallons of ice cream at each loading which was sold only to small craft for the low price of three dollars and seventy-five cents per tub of five imperial gallons. During the Okinawan campaign, the Boreas was consistently under the protection of the harbor smoke boats.

The souvenir craze was as popular on the USS Boreas as it was with any other group of Americans. On the final voyage to Japan, each officer and crewman received at least a Japanese rifle, bayonet and signal pistol as a war trophy.

== Post-war career ==
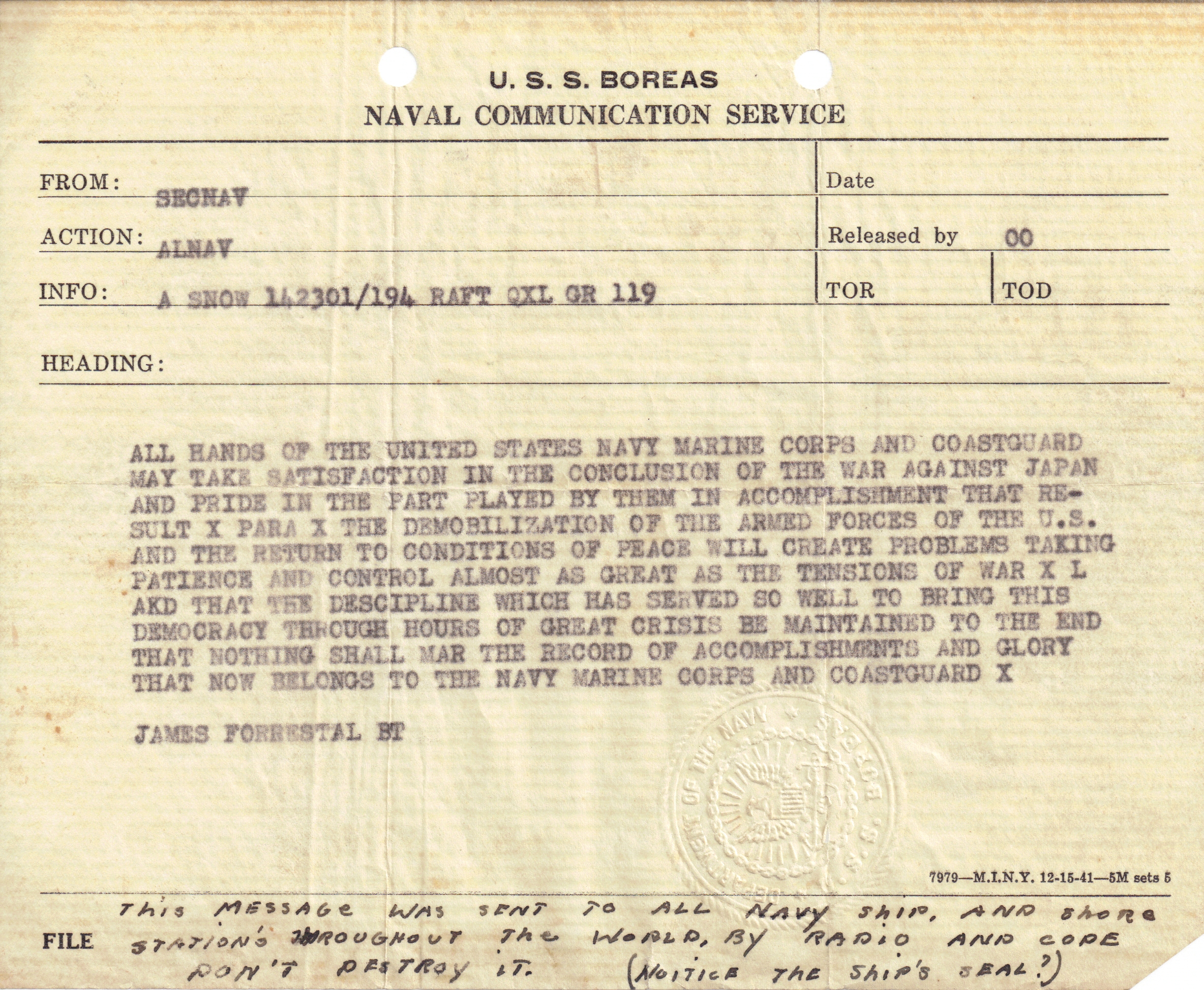
Telegram from Secretary of the Navy James Forrestal announcing the surrender of Japan.

After the Japanese agreed to surrender on 15 August 1945, Boreas carried supplies to Okinawa to support occupation forces there. Later in the fall of 1945, she received orders to move on to Japan and provisioned Wakayama, Nagoya, Sasebo, and Kure from 20 October to 18 November when orders came sending her home. Boreas arrived at San Diego on 23 December.

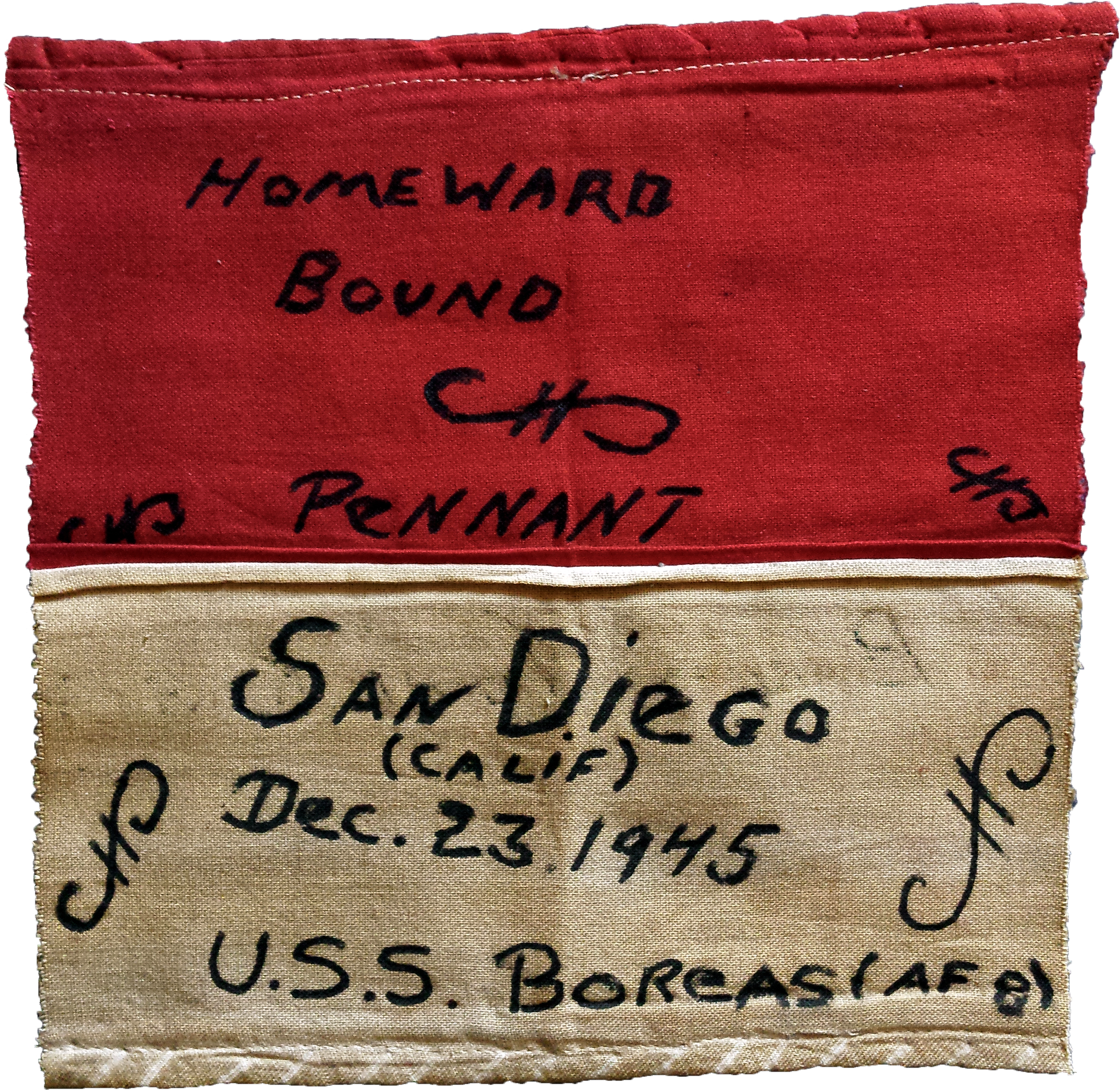
A portion of the 188-foot homeward bound pennant.

The store ship steamed via the Panama Canal for the Norfolk Navy Yard, where she arrived on 19 January 1946. Boreas was decommissioned on 15 February, and her name was struck from the Naval Vessel Register on 28 March. Returned to the War Shipping Administration in July 1946, she was sold on 28 November 1947 to the Patapsco Steel Scrap Co. of Bethlehem, Pennsylvania, and scrapped.

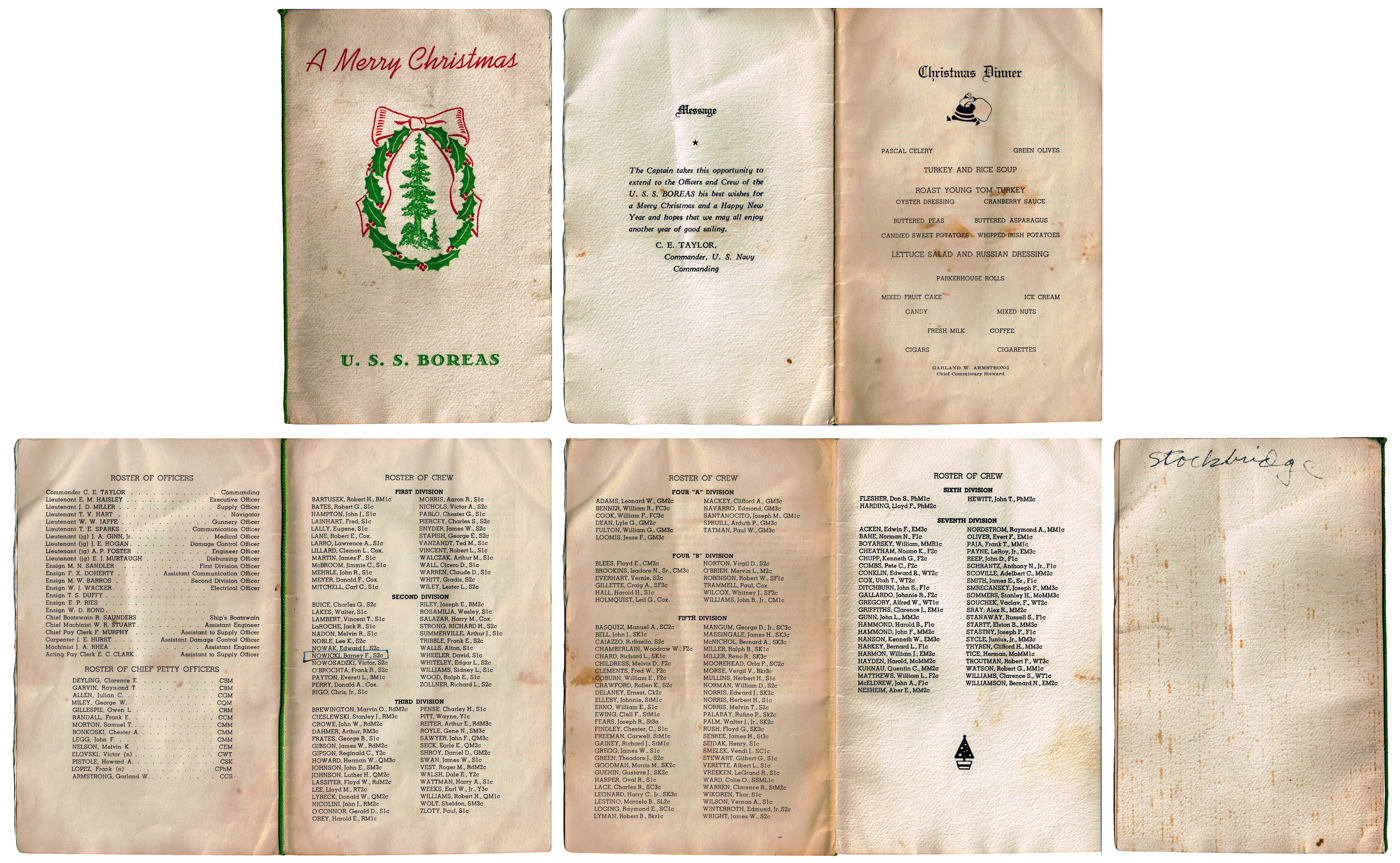
USS Boreas Christmas Dinner Card, 1945.
