= USS New Mexico =

One ship and one submarine of the United States Navy have been named USS New Mexico in honor of the state of New Mexico.

- USS New Mexico (BB-40) was the lead ship of her class of battleship, commissioned in 1918 and struck in 1947.
- USS New Mexico (SSN-779) is a Virginia-class submarine, commissioned in 2010.

== See also ==
- New Mexico-class battleship
- USS Mexican (ID-1655)
- USS General Bragg (1851), formerly SS Mexico and CSS General Bragg
