= USS Keosanqua =

USS Keosanqua may refer to the following ships of the United States Navy:

- USS Keosauqua (1864), a United States Navy sloop-of-war or frigate for which construction plans were cancelled in 1866.
- USS Keosanqua (AT-38), was a fleet tugboat launched 26 February 1920 and sold 11 July 1947
- USS Keosanqua (ATA-198), was launched 17 January 1945 and transferred to the Republic of Korea on 1 February 1962
