= USS Hudson =

USS Hudson may refer to the following ships of the United States Navy:

- USS Hudson (1826), was a frigate purchased by the U.S. Navy in 1828 and sold in 1844
- USRC Hudson (1893), was a U.S. Revenue Cutter Service vessel loaned to the U.S. Navy during the Spanish–American War
- USS Hudson (DD-475), was a Fletcher-class destroyer commissioned 13 April 1943 and sold for scrap in 1973
- USS Hudson (AOT-184), was returned to her owner in February 1984
