= USS Windsor =

Two ships in the United States Navy have been named USS Windsor.

- The first USS Windsor (APA-55) was an attack transport during World War II.
- The second USS Windsor (ARD-22) was an ARD-12-class floating dry dock during World War II.
