= USS Honolulu =

Several US Navy ships have been named USS Honolulu:

- USS Honolulu (ID-1843), a cargo ship in commission from 1917 to 1919
- USS Honolulu (CL-48), a light cruiser in commission from 1938 from 1947
- USS Honolulu (SSN-718), a submarine in commission from 1985 to 2007
