= USS Anthony =

Two ships of the United States Navy have borne the name USS Anthony, in honor of Marine Sergeant Major William Anthony.

- USS Anthony (DD-172), was a Wickes-class destroyer, launched in 1918 and struck in 1936.
- USS Anthony (DD-266), was a Clemson-class destroyer laid down in 1918, but was renamed Greene (DD-266) three months prior to her launching.
- USS Anthony (DD-515), was a Fletcher-class destroyer, launched in 1942, loaned to West Germany in 1958, and struck in 1972.
