= USS Luzon =

USS Luzon may refer to the following ships of the United States Navy:

- USS Luzon (PG-47), a gunboat that was launched on 12 September 1927 and scuttled in Manila Bay on 6 May 1942. Salvaged by the Japanese and renamed Karatsu, she operated until sunk in the Philippines on 3 March 1944
- USS Luzon (ARG-2), an auxiliary ship that was acquired by the US Navy on 24 May 1943 and decommissioned on 1 July 1960
