= USS Lamar =

USS Lamar may refer to the following ships of the United States Navy:

- USS Lamar (APA-47), an attack transport commissioned on 6 April 1944 and decommissioned on 7 March 1946
- USS Lamar (PCE-899), a patrol craft commissioned on 17 March 1945 and transferred to the United States Coast Guard on 29 July 1964
