= USS DuPage (APB-51) =

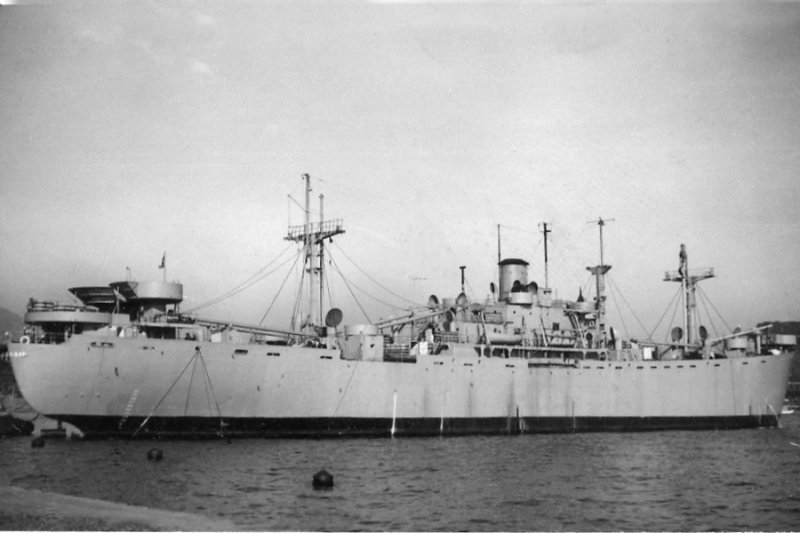

History

United States
- Name: USS DuPage
- Namesake: DuPage County, Illinois
- Builder: Oregon Shipbuilding Co.
- Laid down: 9 December 1942, as SS John W. Weeks
- Launched: 2 January 1943
- Commissioned: 1951 (U.S. Navy)
- Decommissioned: 1959
- Fate: Scrapped in 1959

General characteristics
- Type: EC2-S-C1
- Displacement: 4,023 t. Long tons 11,565 t.full load
- Length: 441 ft 6 in (134.57 m)
- Beam: 56 ft 11 in (17.35 m)
- Draft: 28 ft 4 in (8.64 m)
- Propulsion: reciprocating steam engine, single shaft, 1,950shp
- Speed: 12 knots
- Complement: 151
- Armament: None
- Notes: Troop Accommodations for up to 990

USS DuPage, a self propelled barracks ship was laid down on December 9, 1942, as the Liberty ship S.S. John W. Weeks, and launched on January 2, 1943. It was delivered to the War Shipping Administration for operation under contract to the U.S. Army Transportation Service. In 1951 the ship was acquired by the U.S. Navy and placed in service as the USS DuPage (APB–51). Later it was placed out of service (date unknown) and returned to the Maritime Administration for disposal. The ship was scrapped in 1959.

== Awards ==
- National Defense Service Medal
