= USS Shaw =

Two United States Navy destroyers have been named USS Shaw, after John Shaw, a notable officer in the early days of the Navy.

- USS Shaw (DD-68), commissioned 1917, decommissioned 1922, transferred to the United States Coast Guard in 1926.
- USS Shaw (DD-373), commissioned 1936, decommissioned 1945.
