= USS Prairie =

Two ships of the United States Navy have been named USS Prairie, after the grassland prairie.

- The first USS Prairie (AD-5) was an auxiliary cruiser purchased in 1898 for the Spanish–American War, and in periodic service until sold in 1923.
- The second USS Prairie (AD-15) was a destroyer tender in service from 1940 to 1993.
