= USS Ringgold =

Two ships in the United States Navy have been named USS Ringgold, in honor of Rear Admiral Cadwalader Ringgold (1802–1867).

- The first, USS Ringgold (DD-89), was a Wickes-class destroyer, launched in 1918. In 1940, she was transferred to the Royal Navy and renamed HMS Newark. She was scrapped in 1947.
- The second, USS Ringgold (DD-500), was a Fletcher-class destroyer, launched in 1942 and served in World War II. In 1959, she was transferred to the German Navy and renamed Z-2. In 1981, she was transferred to the Greek Navy and renamed Kimon. She was scrapped in 1993.
