= USS Kane =

Two ships in the United States Navy have been named USS Kane for Elisha Kent Kane:

- USS Kane (DD-235) was a Clemson-class destroyer commissioned in 1920, reclassified as the high speed transport APD-18 in 1943, and decommissioned in 1946.
- USNS Kane (T-AGS-27) was put into service in 1965, struck from the Naval Vessel Register in 2001 and transferred to Turkey.
