= USS Neosho =

USS Neosho may refer to the following ships of the United States Navy:

- USS Neosho (1863), a single-turreted, wooden-hulled, river monitor (1863–1873)
- USS Neosho (AO-23), Cimarron-class oiler (1939–1942), sunk at the Battle of the Coral Sea
- USS Neosho (AO-48), Kennebec-class oiler, launched 1942, sold and renamed SS Catawba
- USS Neosho (AO-143), the lead ship of the Neosho-class oilers (1954). Transferred to Military Sealift Command in 1978 and stricken in 1994
