= USS Talbot =

There have been three United States Navy ships that have borne the name Talbot

- USS Talbot (TB-15) was a torpedo boat commissioned in 1898 and was named after US Navy lieutenant John Gunnell Talbot.
- USS Talbot (DD-114) was a Wickes-class destroyer in the United States Navy commissioned in 1918, named after US Navy Captain Silas Talbot.
- USS Talbot (FFG-4) was a Brooke-class frigate commissioned in 1967, named after Captain Silas Talbot.

== Similar named ==
- USS J. Fred Talbott, a Wickes-class destroyer, was named for Joshua Frederick Cockey Talbott.
- USS Ralph Talbot a Bagley-class destroyer, named for Marine Lt. Ralph Talbot.
