= USS Gunston Hall =

Two ships of the United States Navy have borne the name USS Gunston Hall, in honor of Gunston Hall.

- USS Gunston Hall (LSD-5), was an Ashland-class dock landing ship, launched in 1943 and struck in 1970. She was sold to Argentina, renamed ARA Candido de Lasala (Q-43), decommissioned in 1981, and scrapped
- USS Gunston Hall (LSD-44), is a Whidbey Island-class dock landing ship, launched in 1987 and currently in active service

== See also ==
- SS Gunston Hall, a Design 1015 steel-hulled cargo ship built in 1919
