= USS Pennsylvania =

USS Pennsylvania may refer to:

- USS Pennsylvania (1837) was a 130-gun ship of the line launched in 1837 and burned to prevent capture in 1861
- A Java-class screw frigate, laid down as Keywaden in 1863 but never launched, was renamed Pennsylvania while she lay in the ways before being broken up in 1884
- USS Pennsylvania (ACR-4) was the lead ship of the Pennsylvania-class cruiser launched in 1903; renamed Pittsburgh in 1912; scrapped in 1931
- USS Pennsylvania (BB-38) was the lead ship of the Pennsylvania-class battleship launched in 1915 and sunk in 1948, after atomic bomb testing in 1946
- USS Pennsylvania (SSBN-735) is an Ohio-class submarine launched in 1988 and currently in service

== See also ==
- USS Pennsylvania R. R. No. 9 (SP-679)
- USS Pennsylvanian
- USS Keystone State
