= List of ships built in Alameda, California =

This is a List of ships built in Alameda, California, commercial and military vessels built in the shipyards of Alameda, an historically important island naval base in the San Francisco Bay area of California.

== A ==
- USS Admiral C. F. Hughes (AP-124)
- USS Admiral E. W. Eberle (AP-123)
- USS Admiral Hugh Rodman (AP-126)
- USS Admiral W. L. Capps (AP-121)
- USS Admiral W. S. Sims (AP-127)
- USS ARD-9
- USS ARD-10
- USS ARD-17
- USS ARD-19
- USS Arco (ARD-29)
- USS Ardent (AM-340)

== B ==
- USS Bauer (DE-1025)
- USS Buckthorn (AN-14)

== C ==
- USS Champion (AM-314)
- USS Chickasaw (AT-83)
- USS Chief (AM-315)
- USS Chinquapin (AN-17)
- USS Competent (AM-316)

== D ==
- USS Defense (AM-317)
- USS Devastator (AM-318)

== E ==
- USS Ebony (AN-15)
- USS Eucalyptus (AN-16)

== F ==
- USS Fuller (APA-7)

== G ==
- USS George F. Elliott (AP-13)
- USS Gladiator (AM-319)

== H ==
- USS Heed (AM-100)
- USS Herald (AM-101)
- USS Heywood (APA-6)

== I ==
- USS Impeccable (AM-320)
- USS Independence (ID-3676)
- USCGC Itasca (1929)

== M ==
- USS Motive (AM-102)
- USS Munsee (ATF-107)

== N ==
- USS Nausett (IX-190)
- USS Neville (APA-9)

== O ==
- USS Oak Ridge (ARDM-1)
- USS Oracle (AM-103)

== P ==
- USS Pakana (ATF-108)
- USS Pawnee (ATF-74)

== Q ==
- USS Quapaw (AT-110)

== R ==
- USS Rebel (AM-284)
- USS Recruit (AM-285)
- USS Reform (AM-286)
- USS Refresh (AM-287)
- USS Reign (AM-288)
- USAS Report (AGP-289)
- USS Rescuer (ARS-18)

== S ==
- Ferryboat Santa Rosa
- USS Sarsi (ATF-111)
- USS Sentinel (SP-180)
- USS Sheldrake (AM-62)
- USS Skylark (AM-63)
- USS Starling (AM-64)
- USS Swallow (AM-65)

== V ==
- USS Volunteer (ID-3242)

== W ==
- USS Wateree (ATF-117)
- USS White Sands (ARD-20)
- USS William P. Biddle (APA-8)
