= USS Ardent (AM-340) =

Minesweeper of the United States Navy

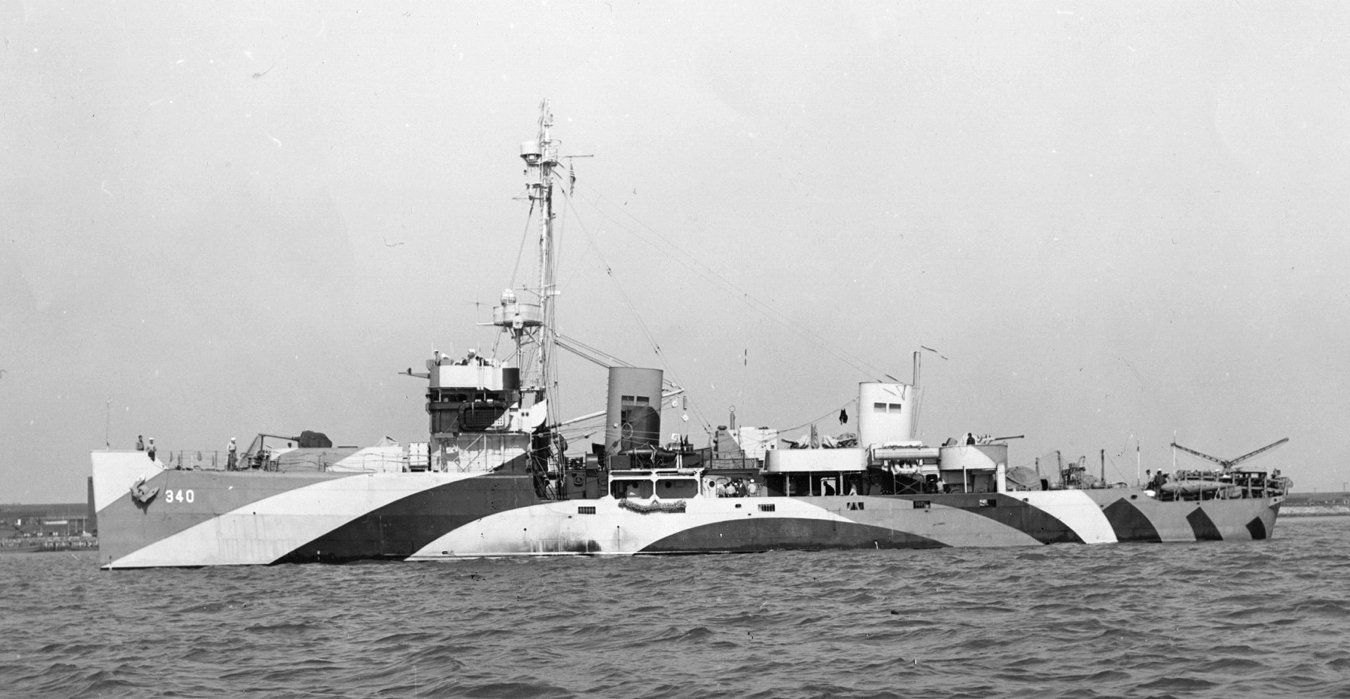
- USS Ardent (AM 340) off the coast of San Francisco, California on 5 June 1944.

History

United States
- Name: USS Ardent (AM-340)
- Builder: General Engineering & Dry Dock Company, Alameda, California
- Laid down: 20 February 1943
- Launched: 22 June 1943
- Commissioned: 25 May 1944
- Decommissioned: 30 January 1947
- Reclassified: MSF-340, 7 February 1955
- Stricken: 1 July 1972
- Honors and awards: 4 battle stars, World War II
- Fate: Transferred to Mexico, 19 September 1972

Mexico
- Name: ARM Juan N. Álvarez (C77)
- Namesake: Juan N. Álvarez
- Acquired: 19 September 1972
- Reclassified: G09; P108, 1993
- Status: in active service, as of 2007

General characteristics
- Class & type: Auk-class minesweeper
- Displacement: 890 tons
- Length: 221 ft 3 in (67 m)
- Beam: 32 (10 m)
- Draft: 10 ft 9 in (3 m)
- Speed: 18 knots (33 km/h)
- Complement: 100
- Armament: 1 X 3 in (76 mm); 2 X 40 mm; 2 X 20 mm; 2 depth charge tracks

The second USS Ardent (AM-340) was a Auk-class minesweeper in the United States Navy.

Ardent was originally laid down as HMS Buffalo (BAM-8), for the Royal Navy on 20 February 1943 at Alameda, California, by the General Engineering & Drydock Co.; rescheduled for delivery to the United States Navy; renamed Ardent and redesignated AM-340 on 24 May 1943; launched on 22 June 1943; sponsored by Mrs. Bernadette Armes, the daughter-in-law of George A. Armes, President of the General Engineering & Drydock Co., and commissioned on 25 May 1944.

== World War II Pacific operations ==
During the first seven months of her career, Ardent escorted convoys and ships operating between the west coast of the United States and the Hawaiian Islands, though she also ranged as far as Eniwetok in the Marshalls and Tarawa in the Gilberts.

== Sinking of the Japanese submarine I-12 ==
The highlight of her service during this period occurred on 13 November. Ardent and the frigate USS Rockford (PF-48) were escorting a six-ship convoy midway between Honolulu and the United States. At 12:32, Ardent's sonar picked up a submarine contact. Ardent attacked first at 12:41, firing a 24-charge "Hedgehog" pattern, and again at 12:46 with a second "Hedgehog" pattern. Rockford left her escort station to assist, and fired her first barrage of rockets from her "Hedgehog" at 13:08; two explosions followed, before an underwater detonation rocked the ship.

Ardent carried out two more attacks and the frigate dropped 13 depth charges to administer the coup de grace. The resulting explosions caused a loss of all contact with the enemy submarine. Wreckage recovered on the scene—deck planks, ground cork covered with diesel oil, a wooden slat from a vegetable crate with Japanese writing and advertisements on it, pieces of varnished mahogany inscribed in Japanese, and a piece of deck planking containing Japanese builders' inscriptions—indicated a definite "kill". Postwar research revealed the sunken submarine to be the Japanese submarine I-12, which had sailed from the Inland Sea on 4 October 1944 to disrupt American shipping between the west coast and the Hawaiian Islands. In sinking I-12, Ardent and Rockford unwittingly avenged the atrocity I-12 had perpetrated on 30 October when, after sinking the Liberty ship SS John A. Johnson, the submarine had rammed and sunk the lifeboats and rafts and then machine-gunned the 70 survivors. Among the ten men killed were five enlisted men of the merchantman's Navy armed guard detachment.

== Second Pacific deployment ==
On 1 December 1944, Ardent departed San Francisco, California, and headed for Hawaii. She reached Pearl Harbor on the 10th and underwent an intensive training period before sailing for the Marshall Islands on 27 January 1945 with Task Group (TG) 51.11, arriving on 5 February at Eniwetok. Two days later, Ardent sailed for Tinian, and reported for duty with TG 52.3 on the 11th. On 13 February, the ship got underway, in company with USS Champion (AM-314), USS Devastator (AM-318), and USS Defense (AM-317), to participate in the Iwo Jima campaign.

She conducted mine-sweeping operations off that island during the day from 15 to 18 February, and each night, her group retired to screen USS Estes (AGC-12). During the sweeps, the ships came under intermittent fire from enemy shore batteries, but sustained no damage. On 19 February, Ardent took bomb-damaged USS Blessman (DE-69) in tow and proceeded to the Marianas as escort for a convoy of damaged LCIs.

== Ship shoots down Japanese planes ==
Upon reaching Saipan on the 25th, the minesweeper embarked 20 marines and loaded 149 sacks of mail for delivery at Iwo Jima. She arrived back at that island on 1 March but shaped a course for Ulithi the next day as escort for Task Unit (TU) 51.29.3. A few weeks later, Ardent got underway with TG 52.4 to take part in the assault on Okinawa. She began mine-sweeping operations on the 24th and continued them through the 31st, the unit to which she was attached destroying 17 mines during this time period. During frequent enemy air attacks, the minesweeper took several Japanese planes under fire. On 26 March, an enemy plane under fire from the nearby fast minelayer USS Adams (DM-27) started a glide for USS Ardent's stern. The minesweeper opened fire and splashed the plane 300 yards (270 m) away.

On four occasions on 28 March, Japanese aircraft approached Ardent and her consorts. An adjacent formation shot down the first, 5,000 yards (4,600 m) from USS Ardent's port beam. Combined fire from Adams and Ardent, as well as other ships in the formation, splashed the second, 1,200 yards (1,100 m) on the port beam. Ardent opened fire on the third aircraft, and saw it splash, the victim of a barrage put up by a formation of ships on the starboard quarter. USS Adams accounted for the fourth enemy aircraft. Later that same day, the minesweeper USS Skylark (AM-63) struck a mine and sank; Ardent rescued 19 survivors.

== Okinawa landings ==
Following the completion of mine-sweeping operations, Ardent assumed station on a patrol screen. On L-day, the day of the landings at Okinawa, 1 April 1945, a suicider crashed the nearby USS Adams (DM-27), causing extensive damage. During this period, Ardent opened fire on several Japanese planes, but scored no hits.

== Stateside repair period ==
Ordered to proceed to Saipan for engine repairs, Ardent sailed for her destination on 4 April, and arrived on 10 April. Since parts necessary for the repairs were not available in the forward areas, she was routed via Pearl Harbor, to Seattle, where she arrived on 30 May.

Ardent underwent engine repairs at Seattle, Washington until 7 August. Six days later, on the 13th, the minesweeper sailed for Pearl Harbor, and was at sea, en route to the Hawaiian Islands, when the war with Japan ended.

== Post-World War II operations ==
Departing Pearl Harbor on 20 August in company with USS Scoter (AM-381) and USS Redstart (AM-378), Ardent called at Saipan from 13 to 17 September, and arrived at Okinawa on the 21st.

Pushing on for Japan, Ardent moored at Sasebo, Japan, on 27 September, disembarking passengers, and delivering mail and freight. The ship made a brief trip back to Okinawa, arriving there on 2 October, before she returned to Sasebo on 20 October. During her time at Okinawa, she sortied on 7 October to ride out a typhoon, and conducted sweeps down the island's east coast for survivors of that storm. Joining TU 52.4.1 on 27 October, Ardent proceeded to the "Klondike" minefield area, located in the East China Sea 100 miles (160 km) southwest of Kyūshū. She conducted daily minesweeping operations until 8 November, when she arrived back at Sasebo. Between that time and the end of the year, Ardent operated between Honshū and Kyūshū, escorting ships, transporting minesweeping gear, and observing Japanese minesweeping operations and conducting demolition firing at the mine disposal grounds at Kushikino Ko. She remained thus engaged into March 1946.

Routed to Kobe on 4 March 1946, in company with USS Defense (AM-317), Ardent sailed for the Hawaiian Islands two days later, on 6 March. Touching at Saipan, Eniwetok, Johnston Island and Pearl Harbor, the minesweeper continued on to the west coast of the United States; parting company from USS Defense on 16 April, Ardent dropped anchor in San Francisco Bay on 19 April.

== Stateside inactivity ==
The minesweeper lay in the San Francisco Naval Shipyard until November 1946. Subsequently, proceeding to San Diego in company with USS Vigilance (AM-324), Ardent then operated in the vicinity of San Clemente Island, Newport Beach, and Oceanside, California, and on air-sea rescue stations off the coast of southern California. Returning to pier 17, Treasure Island (California), on 15 December 1946, to commence preparations for inactivation, Ardent shifted to the San Diego Naval Station on 22 January 1947.

== Decommissioning ==
Placed out of commission, in reserve, on 30 January 1947, Ardent was berthed with the San Diego group of the Pacific Reserve Fleet. While she was in reserve, the ship's designation was changed to MSF-340 on 7 February 1955. Struck from the Navy List on 1 July 1972, the ship was subsequently sold to the government of Mexico on 19 September 1972.

== Mexican Navy service ==
On 19 September 1972, the former Ardent was sold to the Mexican Navy, which renamed her ARM Juan N. Álvarez (C77). Her pennant number was later changed to G09, before being changed a final time to P108 in 1993. As of 2007, Juan N. Álvarez was still in active service for the Mexican Navy.

== Awards ==
Ardent earned four battle stars for her World War II service.
