= P104 =

P104 may refer to:

- ARM Manuel Doblado (P104), a patrol boat of the Mexican Navy
- Papyrus 104, a biblical manuscript
- P104, a state regional road in Latvia
