= P106 =

P106 may refer to:

- ARM Santos Degollado (P106), a patrol boat of the Mexican Navy
- Papyrus 106, a biblical manuscript
- P106, a state regional road in Latvia
