= General Engineering & Dry Dock Company =

Shipyard in Alameda, California, United States

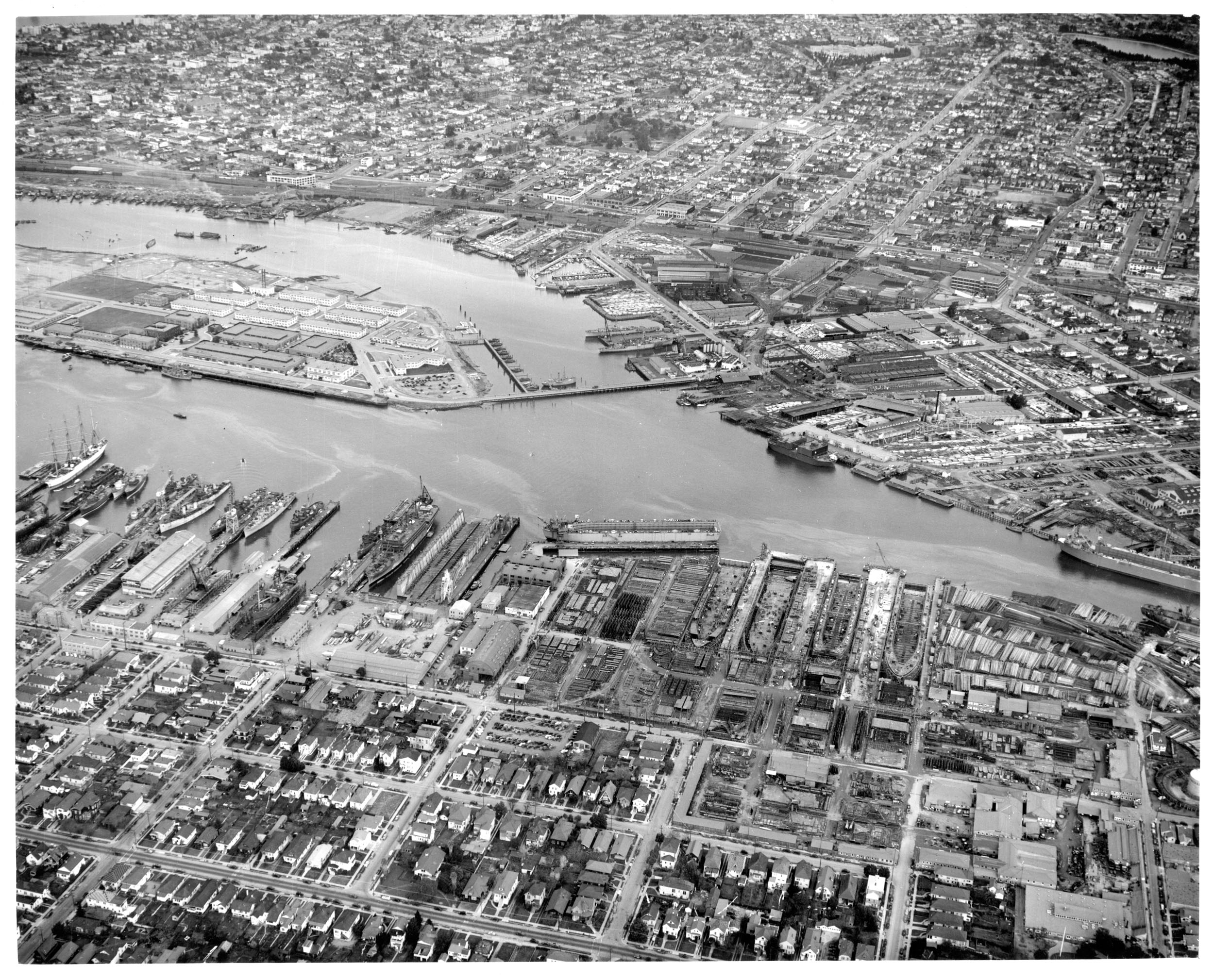
The General Engineering yard to the south of Coast Guard Island

General Engineering & Dry Dock Company was a shipbuilding and ship repair company in Alameda, California that was active from the 1920s through the 1940s. The company built ships for the Southern Pacific Railroad and the United States Coast Guard in the late 1920s and early 1930s and took part in the World War II shipbuilding boom, making diesel-propelled steel hulled auxiliaries for the United States Navy, primarily oceangoing minesweepers.

== History ==
At the beginning of World War II, the U.S.Navy started the program for expand the navy. The U.S.Navy used two separate shipbuilding and shiprepair sites to create the Naval Industrial Reserve Shipyard (NIRS) Alameda. The first was the General Engineering and Dry Dock Company. The company worked under contract NObs-344 and built small warships for the U.S. Navy. The shipyard had four shipbuilding ways, which were designed for the simultaneous construction of several ships. In 1946, the U.S. Navy ceased contract with company. The second portion of the Site was to the east of the shipbuilding company. It was purchased from March 24 to July 7, 1942.

General Engineering & Dry Dock Company shipbuilding company started in Oakland, California. To support the World War II demand for ships General Engineering built: minesweepers and Net laying ships. General Engineering was opened in 1919 as Barnes & Tibbitts shipyard by J. D. Barnes and W. G. Tibbitts. Mr. Barnes sold his interest to Tibbitts in 1922 and changed the company name to General Engineering & Dry Dock Company. Tibbitts purchased Hanlon Dry Dock and Shipbuilding in Oakland in 1928. By 1940 the site of the old Hanlon yard (foot of 5th Ave) was occupied by Hurley Marine Shipyard, but in 1933 it had still belonged to General Engineering. After World War II, the shipyards closed in 1948. The shipyard was located at 1805 Clement Ave, Alameda, California. The site is now the Alameda Marina and Island Yacht Club.

Office, machine shop and general repairs at 1100 Sansome Street, San Francisco. 37.80046°N 122.40253°W

On 14 March 1918 the Barnes and Tibbitts Shipbuilding and Dry Dock Co. was incorporated in California.

On 1 November 1922 the General Engineering and Dry Dock Company was incorporated in California.

On 11 March 1946 the General Engineering and Dry Dock Corporation was incorporated in Delaware.

== Notable ships built ==
1920s

- Five ferries for the Golden Gate Ferry Company
  - Golden State Yard#1
  - Golden Bear #3, launched 2 February 1927
  - Golden Poppy #4, diesel-electric ferry launched 2 April 1927
  - Golden Shore #5. diesel-electric ferry launched 30 April 1927
  - Golden Age #12 diesel-electric ferry launched 21 January 1928
- 1 of 6 Steel Electric class ferries
  - Santa Rosa #6 for Northwestern Pacific Railroad, launched 17 March 1927
- Catherine Paladini, 78ft, 200hp Atlas diesel wooden trawler delivered August 1928

1930s

- Lakes-class cutters (Oakland yard, contract ca. April 1929)
  - USCGC Itasca
  - USCGC Sebago
  - USCGC Saranac
  - USCGC Shoshone

1940s (World War II)

- General Engineering placed unsuccessful bids on C1 cargo ships in 1939
- 4 of 32 Aloe-class net laying ships (Yard #39 ... #42)
  - Buckthorn (AN-14), Ebony, Eucalyptus, Chinquapin (AN-17)
- 16 of 95 Auk-class minesweepers (#43 .. #58)
  - Sheldrake (AM-62), Skylark, Starling, Swallow (AM-65)
  - Heed (AM-100), Herald, Motive, Oracle (AM-103)
  - Champion (AM-314), Chief, Competent, Defense, Devastator, Gladiator, Impeccable (AM-320)
  - Ardent (AM-340)
- 7 of 123 Admirable-class minesweepers (#59 ... #65)
  - Ransom (AM-283), Rebel, Recruit, Reform, Refresh, Reign, Report (AM-289)

== In the press ==
| Date | Topic | Ref |
|---|---|---|
| Aug 1917 | Barnes & Tibbitts launch 125hp patrol boat Sentinel | |
| Mar 18 | B&T launched 170ft 3-masted schooner Carolyn Frances on 11 Feb | |
| Apr 18 | B&T are fitting out 2 NW-Pacific-built Hough-type ships for the EFC | |
| May 18 | George A. Armes appointed president of the Moore Shipbuilding Company | |
| Oct 21 | G. A. Armes has resigned as president and general manager of the Moore Shipbuilding Company | |
| Nov 21 | New Repair Firm; the General Engineering Company has been incorporated by Armes, J. F. Mooney and James Young (both formerly with Skinner & Eddy, then Hanlon) | |
| Dec 22 | The General Engineering Expansion; Barnes & Tibbits has been acquired, company renames to G.E.& D.D. Co, plant map + photographs | |
| Sep 28 | Announcing a Consolidation for Better Service; Hanlon Dry Dock and Shipbuilding now part of GEDDCO | |
| Apr 46 | Pioneer Dry Dock Company Changes Controls; Godfrey K. Waters new owner of GEDDCO | |
| Oct 1948 | GEDDCO Changes Hands; Delaware corp dissolved, new California corp (same name); Loyola University Foundation new owner | |

== See also ==
- California during World War II
- Maritime history of California
- List of ships built in Alameda, California
- Moore Dry Dock Company#Shipbuilding in Oakland and Alameda
