= Hanlon Dry Dock and Shipbuilding =

American shipbuilding company

Coordinates: 37.78894°N 122.26242°W

Hanlon was a shipyard in Oakland Inner Harbor on the north bank of the Oakland Estuary at the foot of 5th Ave. In 1919 the site had 5 slipways and occupied 13 acres.

Founded in 1915 by Dan Hanlon, a former longshoreman, the yard produced a few barges and the cargo ships Bacchus and Joplin for the Herules Powder Company as well as 11 cargo ships for the United States Shipping Board, with 2 being requisitions and 9 built under contract. Hanlon was the sole producer of Design 1043 ships.

- Governor John Lind, Major Wheeler in 1918 (all dates are delivery dates)
- 9 of 9 Design 1043 ships
  - Delfina, Delisle in 1918
  - Dellwood, Delrosa, Depere, Derblay, Jeptha (Denall), Medon in 1920
  - Memnon in 1921

Hanlon's workforce rose from 500 to 2,000 between 1916-1920 and utilized a pioneering electrically controlled drydock.

In 1928 the yard was bought by the nearby General Engineering & Dry Dock Company, in 1940 the Hurley Marine Shipyard repair facility operated on the site.

== See also ==
- Moore Dry Dock Company#Shipbuilding in Oakland and Alameda
- A. H. Bull Steamship Company#Baltimore Insular Line Inc. ships - John Lind, Major Wheeler, Delfina, Delisle
