= Long Beach Naval Shipyard =

Shipyard in Los Angeles

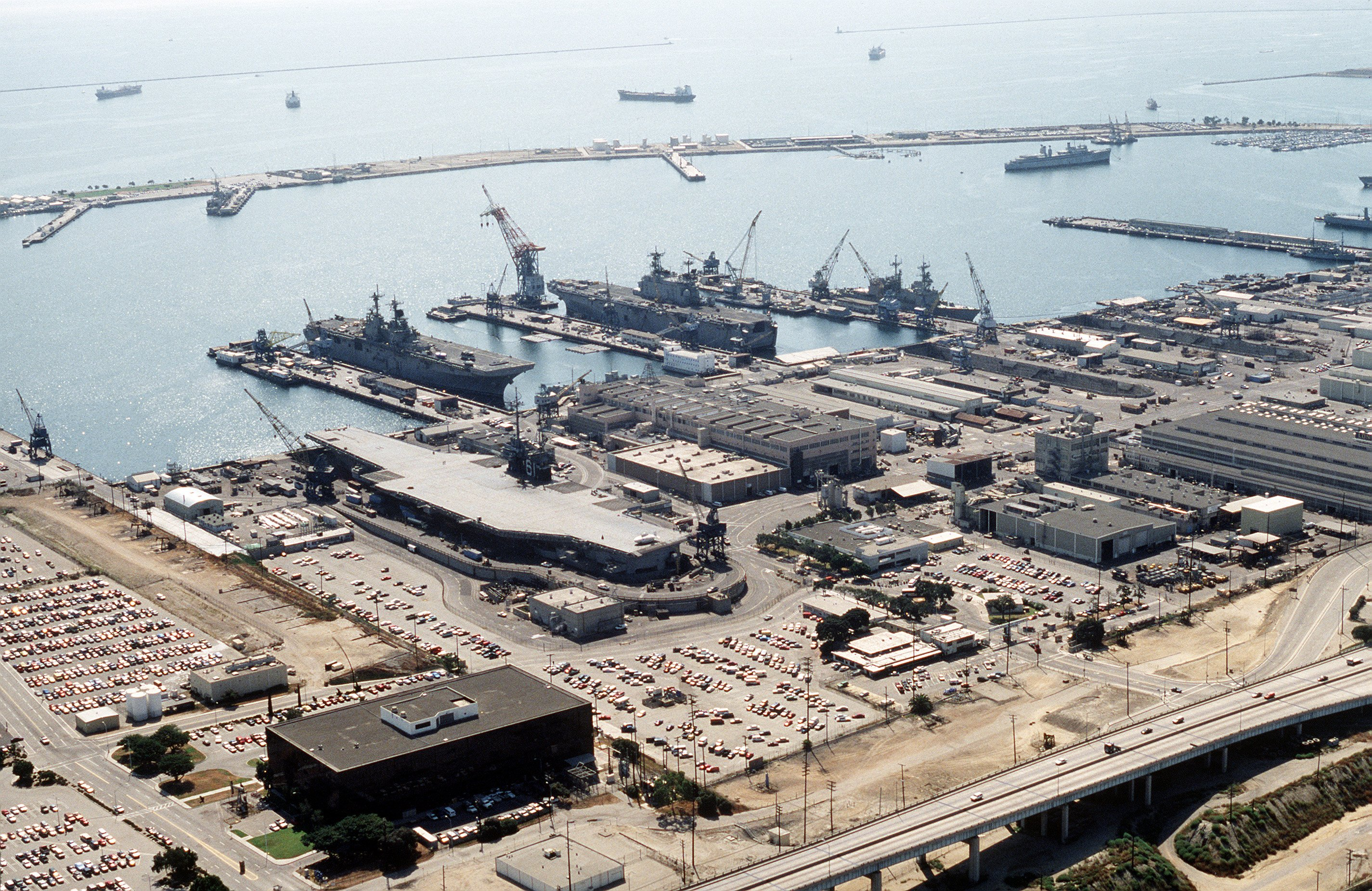
- Long Beach Naval Shipyard in 1993; USS Ranger can be seen in Dry Dock no. 1.

Site information
- Code: LBNSY

Location
- Coordinates: 33°45′26″N 118°13′52″W

Site history
- Built: February 1943
- In use: until 30 September 1997

The Long Beach Naval Shipyard (Long Beach NSY or LBNSY), which closed in 1997, was located on Terminal Island between the city of Long Beach and the San Pedro district of Los Angeles, approximately 23 miles south of the Los Angeles International Airport. The primary role of NSY Long Beach at the time of its closure was overhaul and maintenance of conventionally-powered US Navy surface ships, but it also had served as the homeport for several auxiliary ships during its operating history.

== LBNSY description ==
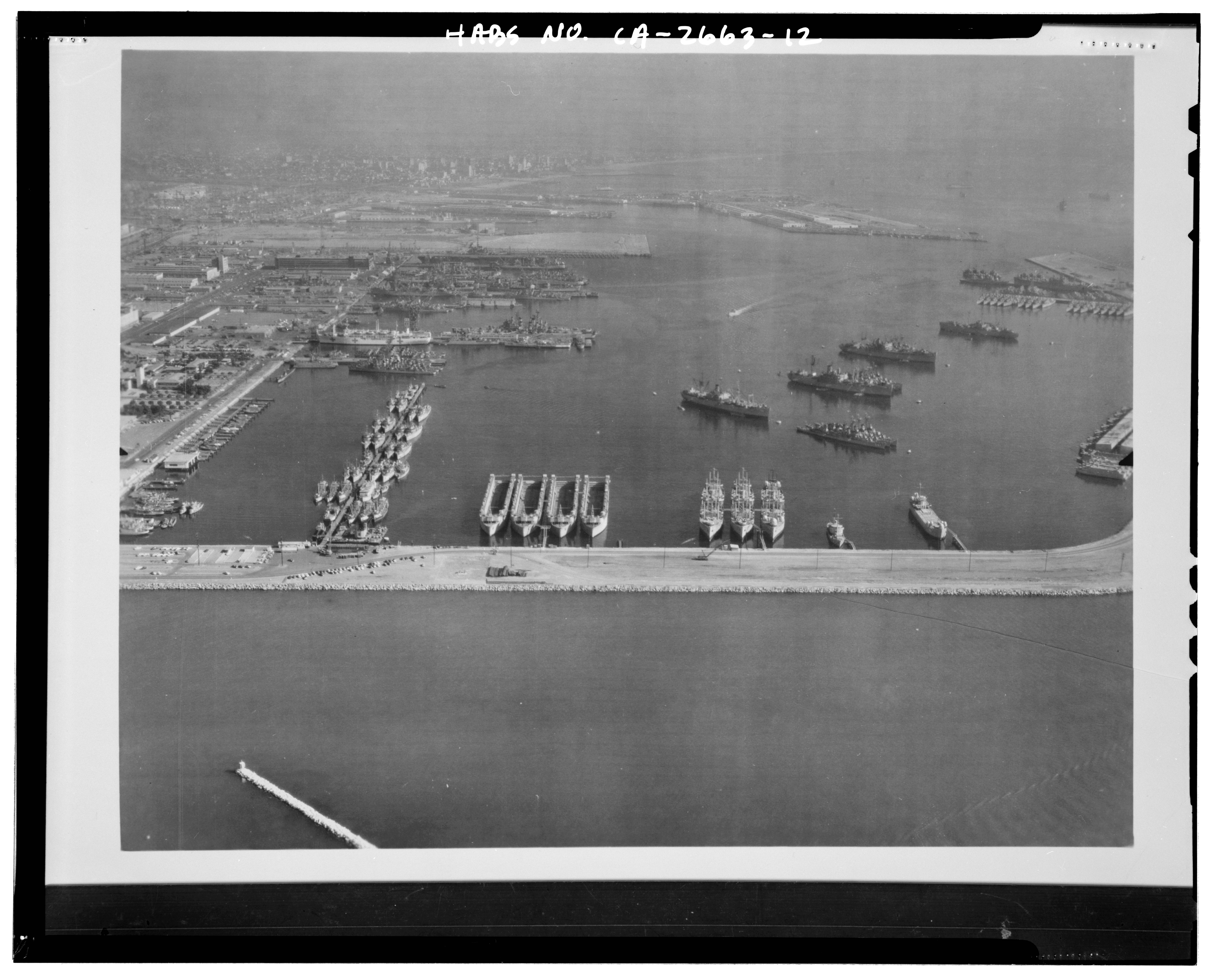
Undated aerial photo of the shipyard with downtown Long Beach in the background

The Long Beach NSY industrial area encompassed 119 acres (48 ha) of the total 214 acres (87 ha) owned. There were 120 permanent, 39 semi-permanent, and 6 temporary buildings, for a total of 165 buildings. There were 17 different shop work areas and 2,400,000 square feet (220,000 m^{2}) of covered building space. The shipyard had three graving docks, and five industrial piers. There were 12,307 feet (3.751 km) (measured linearly) of ship berthing space. Crane capacity ranged from 25 short tons (23 t) to 67 short tons (61 t) (portal) and from 25 short tons (23 t) to 112 short tons (102 t) (floating).

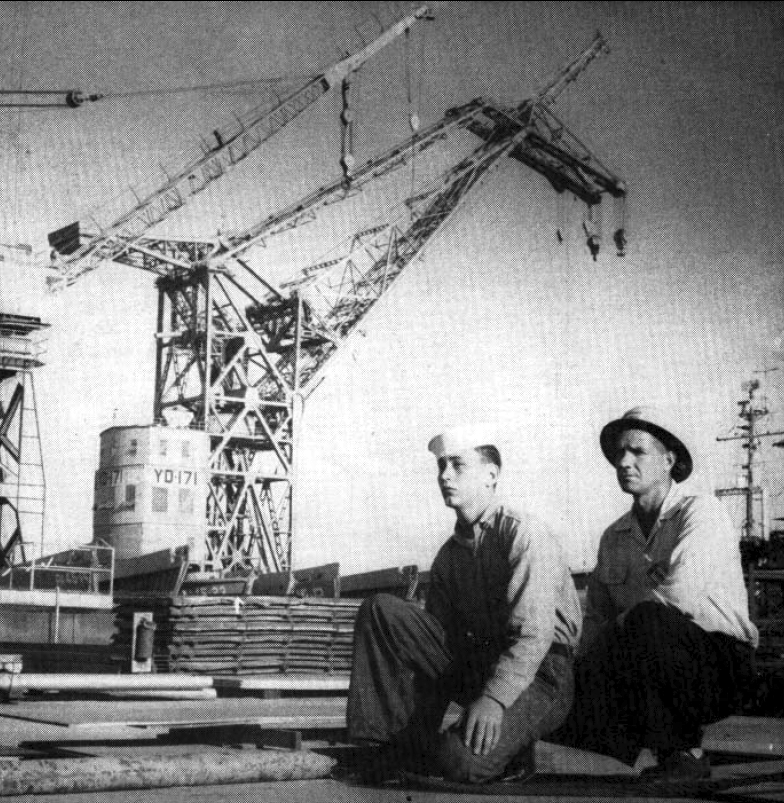
"Herman the German" (YD-171) at Long Beach NSY in 1957.

One of the large cranes at Long Beach NSY, YD-171, was nicknamed "Herman the German" based on its origin as a floating crane for the Kriegsmarine (one of four ships in the class). It is a large self-propelled crane standing 374 feet (114 m) tall with a lifting capacity of 385 short tons (349 t), and was claimed to be the largest floating crane in operation as of 1957. "Herman the German" was seized as a war prize following the end of World War II. "Herman" was dismantled and transported across the Atlantic through the Panama Canal to Long Beach, where it was reassembled and subsequently served at the Long Beach NSY from 1946 to 1996. While serving at Long Beach, it participated in the refurbishment of the battleships USS Missouri and New Jersey in the 1980s and lifted the Hughes H-4 ("Spruce Goose") from its original hangar in Long Beach when it was relocated to its geodesic dome from 1980 to 1982 for tourist display by the Wrather Corporation. Following the closure of the shipyard, the crane was sold to the Panama Canal Commission and was transported on the semi-submersible ship "Sea Swan" (IMO 8001000) to the Panama Canal Zone, where it currently serves as the floating crane "Titan".

Dry Dock 1 had plan dimensions of 143 by 1,092 feet (44 by 333 m), and Dry Docks 2 and 3 had plan dimensions of 92 by 693 feet (28 by 211 m).

The total naval presence on Terminal Island included two installations (Long Beach Naval Shipyard, 563 acres (228 ha) and Long Beach Naval Station, 928 acres (376 ha)), for a total of 1,095 acres (443 ha) on Terminal Island and 319 acres (129 ha) of off-base housing. Half to two-thirds of the area of the finished NSY was built on new fill, so structures were supported on piles.

== Dry Docks ==
Dock No.	Material of which dock is constructed	Length	Width	Depth	Date Completed	Source
1	Concrete	1,093 feet 6 inches (333.30 m)	155 feet (47 m)	44 feet 3 inches (13.49 m)	1942	
2	Concrete	687 feet 6 inches (209.55 m)	104 feet (32 m)	37 feet (11 m)	1943	
3	Concrete	687 feet 6 inches (209.55 m)	104 feet (32 m)	36 feet (11 m)	1943	

== History ==
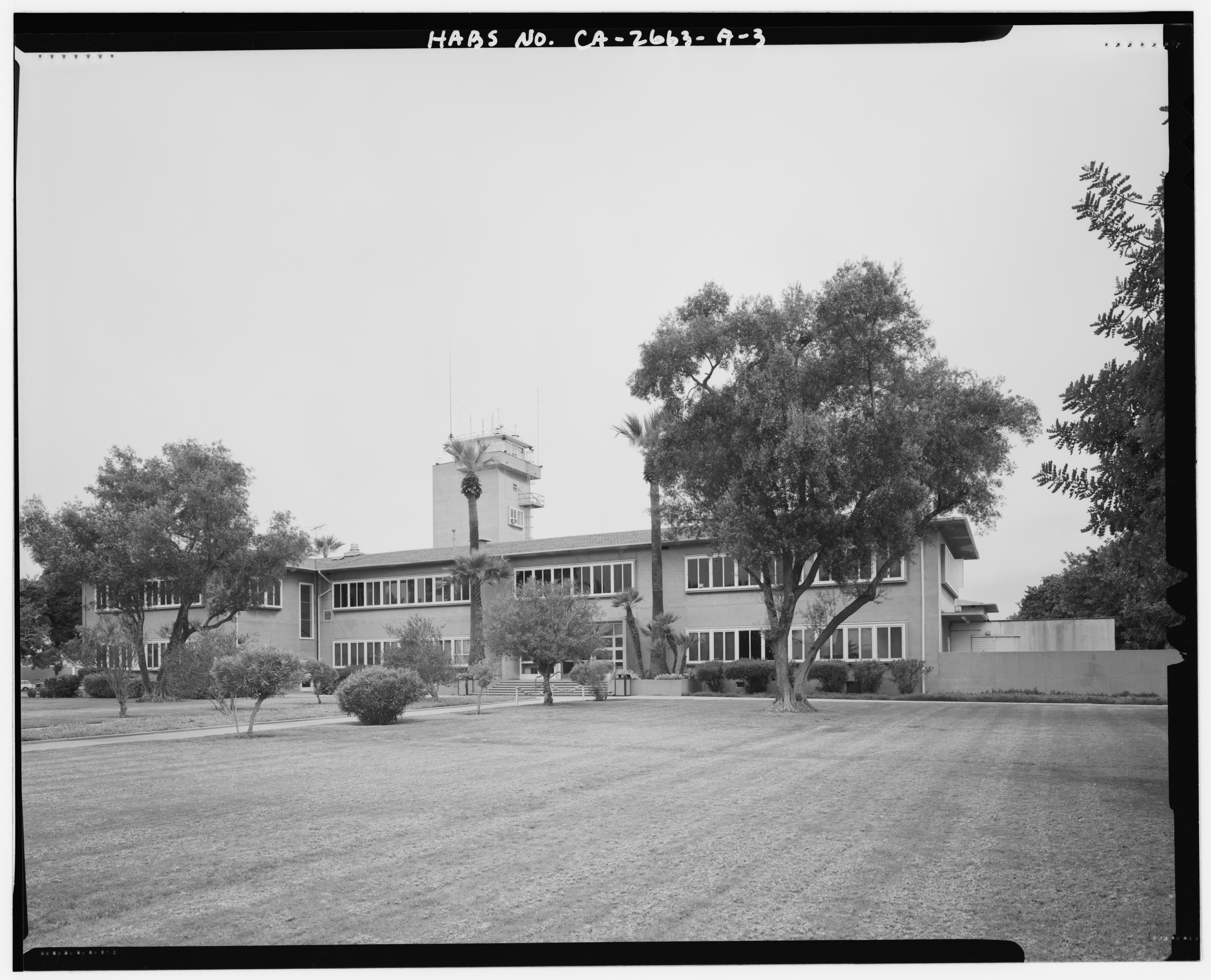
Roosevelt Base, Administration and Brig Building

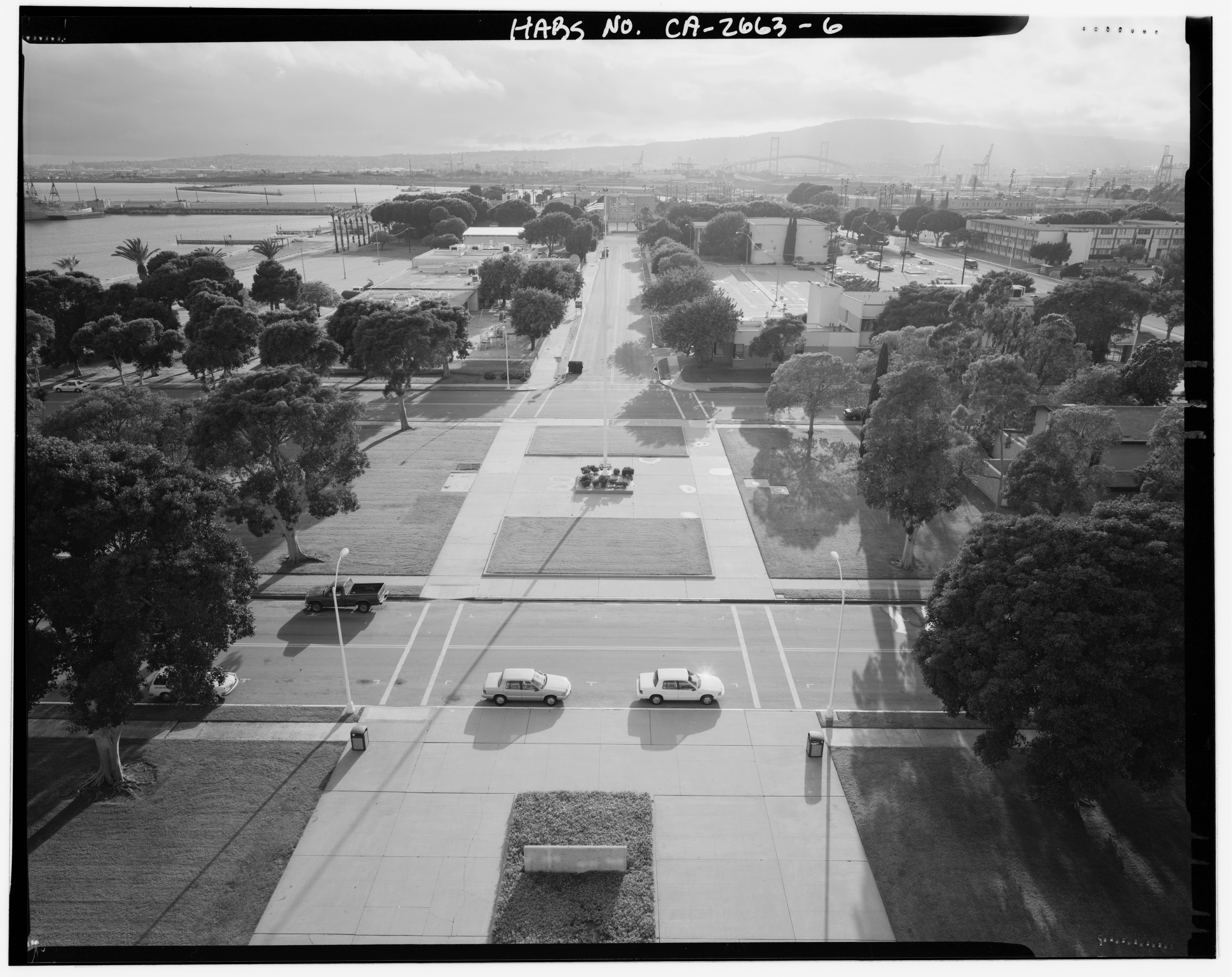
Roosevelt Base

Navy presence on Terminal Island started in 1938. The Terminal Island Naval Dry Docks were authorized in June 1940, and construction began in August 1940 on one large drydock and two smaller docks. Recreation facilities, personnel and shop buildings were ordered in February 1942, and work began on Drydocks 2 and 3 and several piers in April 1942. On 9 February 1943, the Secretary of the Navy established the facilities as the US Naval Dry Docks, Roosevelt Base, California. Also in 1943, a barrack for Marines was built, work began on another approach pier, a 50 short tons (45 t) drydock crane was erected, and several shop buildings were started. In 1944, work started on the pontoons destined to be used in a "temporary" bridge to Terminal Island. The pontoon bridge would not be removed until the opening of the Gerald Desmond Bridge in 1968. The name of this facility was changed to Terminal Island Naval Shipyard on 30 November 1945. On 15 November 1946, the adjoining Naval Station Long Beach was established. The shipyard was renamed Long Beach Naval Shipyard (NSY) in March 1948.

During World War II, the naval dry docks provided routine and battle damage repairs to a parade of tankers, cargo ships, troop transports, destroyers, and cruisers. Peak employment of 16,091 civilian employees was reached in August 1945.

Long Beach NSY was equipped with facilities and skills to perform all non-nuclear structural, sheet metal, boiler, rigging, electronics, electrical, insulating, lagging, ordnance, sandblasting, welding, machining, woodworking, painting, pipe fitting, and other work pertaining to the overhaul and repair of surface ships. The shipyard possessed complete design, engineering, combat systems, quality assurance, planning and public works capabilities to support its industrial work. Dry dock No. 1 was designated the West Coast nuclear powered aircraft carrier (CVN) emergency dry dock.

Long Beach NSY was placed in an inactive status on 1 June 1950. The Korean War began less than one month later, and the shipyard was reactivated on 4 January 1951.

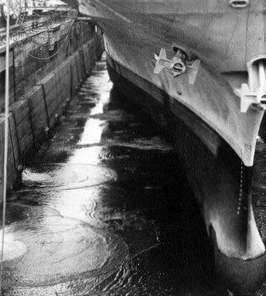
Bow of USS Kearsarge (CV-33) at Long Beach Naval Station, 1969

Through the years the shipyard accomplished several special projects in addition to its primary mission. These included support or scientific projects in conjunction with programs like POLARIS, POSEIDON, and SEALAB.

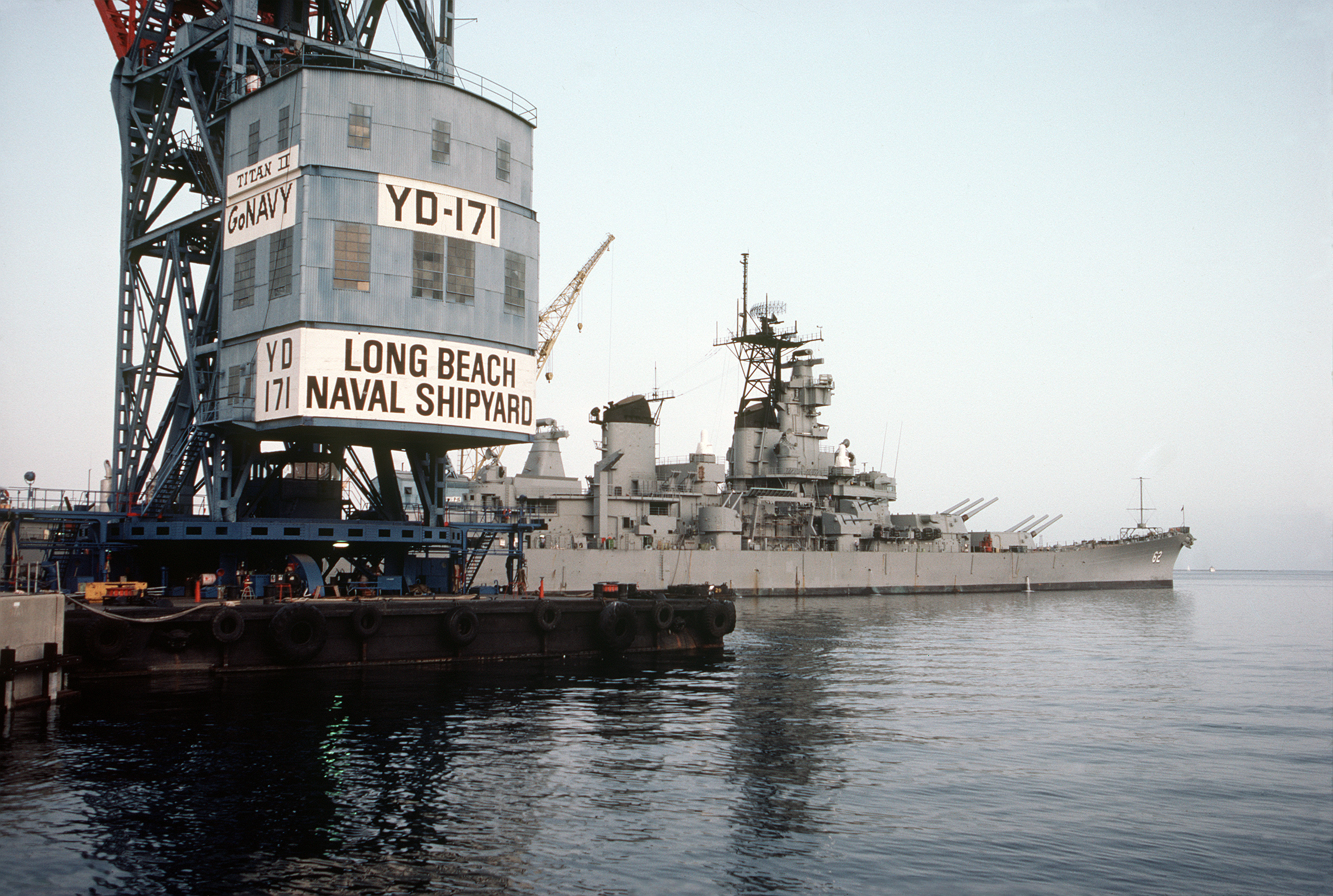
USS New Jersey (BB-62) with the "Herman the German" crane, circa 1982

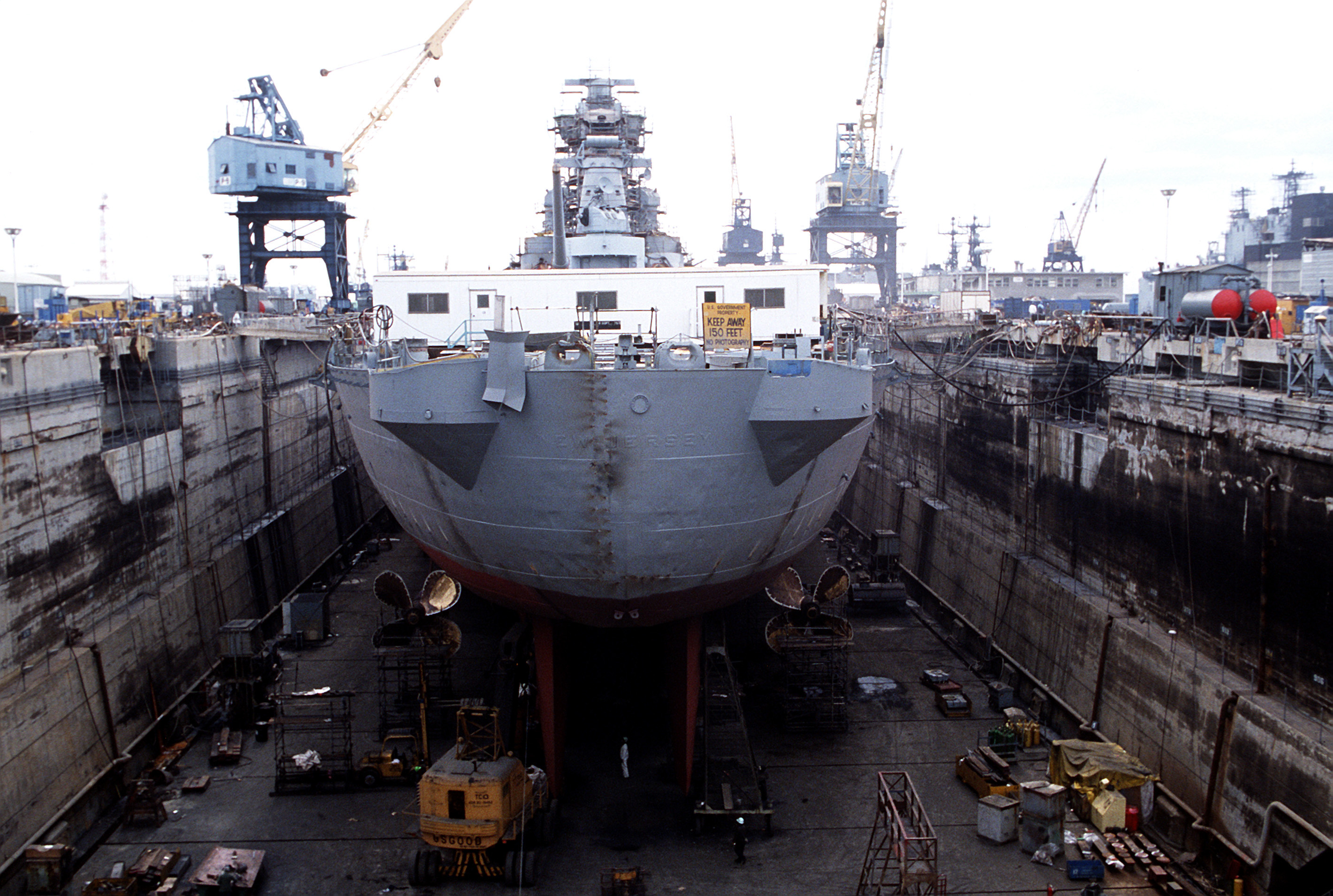
USS New Jersey (BB-62) in drydock, 1982

=== Closure ===
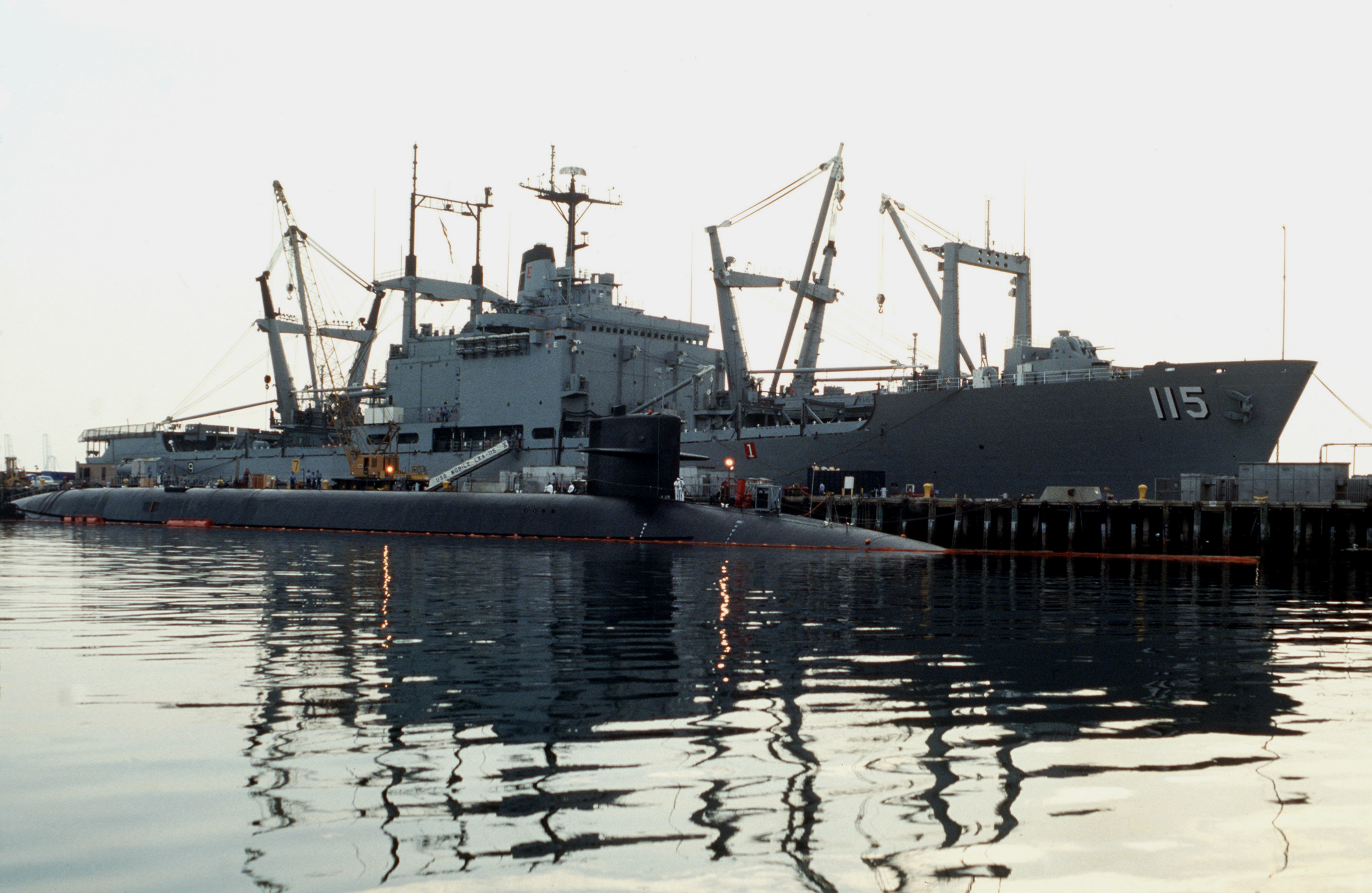
USS Nevada and Mobile at Long Beach Naval Shipyard, 1990

Long Beach NSY was evaluated under every round of Base Realignment and Closure (BRAC) for possible closure since the inception of the BRAC process in 1988. In 1993, California congressmen Horn and Rohrabacher cited the military value of the shipyard in a successful attempt to keep it open. Mare Island NSY was closed following the 1993 evaluations, and the vote in favor of keeping LBNSY open was narrowly decided by the BRAC Commission chairman's tiebreaking vote.

However, two years later, the naval shipyard was recommended for closure in the 1995 round of BRAC evaluations (BRAC IV) by then-Defense Secretary William Perry. Although the commission toured Long Beach NSY in April 1995, the BRAC Commission elected not to override the recommendation to close Long Beach NSY, and closure was completed on 30 September 1997. By 2004, 72% of the land had been turned over to the City of Long Beach by the military.

The shipyard appears in a 1995 episode of Visiting... with Huell Howser.

=== Civilian use ===
Lone Sailor statue in nearby Bluff Park, Long Beach

In 1997, COSCO (The China Ocean Shipping Company) wanted to lease the space from the City, including building a $400 million cargo terminal. It was opposed by Rush Limbaugh, as the company was owned by the Communist run People's Republic of China, and was being reviewed for national security by the Department of Defense.

After review by the DoD and CIA, the lease went through, at an agreed-upon payment of $14.5 million per year from the Chinese, with renewal scheduled after ten years. However, continued controversy and opposition by Republican lawmakers caused cancellation of the lease, and the new cargo terminal, which was in fact built by the Long Beach Harbor Department (Port of Long Beach), was leased to Hanjin Shipping, a South Korean firm. Hanjin was the majority partner in Total Terminals International (TTI), which was the primary tenant at Pier T until the financial collapse of Hanjin in August 2016. Hanjin entered talks to sell its stake in the Long Beach Terminal to its minority partner in TTI, Mediterranean Shipping Company in October 2016.

== Pacific Reserve Fleet, Long Beach ==
Pacific Reserve Fleet, Long Beach was opened at Long Beach Naval Shipyard for use as part of the United States Navy reserve fleets, also called a mothball fleet. The Pacific Reserve Fleet, Long Beach was used to store the now many surplus ships after World War II. Some ships in the Pacific Reserve Fleet, Long Beach were reactivated for the Korean War and Vietnam War. At its closing the ships stored at Pacific Reserve Fleet, Long Beach were either scrapped or moved to other reserve fleets. Three ships reactivated for the Korean War were three minesweepers on March 1, 1952 the: USS Competent (AM-316), USS Gladiator (AM-319) and USS Devastator (AM-318). USS Bucyrus Victory (AK-234) was placed in the fleet in August 1969 and sold for scrapping the same year. The USS Isle Royale (AD-29) was laid in the fleet and used as the headquarters of the Pacific Reserve Fleet, Long Beach, in June 1962 she was put back in service for the Vietnam War.
