= USS Recruit (AM-285) =

Minesweeper of the United States Navy

History

United States
- Name: USS Recruit (AM-285)
- Builder: General Engineering & Dry Dock Company, Alameda, California
- Laid down: 24 May 1943
- Launched: 11 December 1943
- Sponsored by: Miss Kathleen Merrit Jackson
- Commissioned: 8 November 1944
- Decommissioned: 15 August 1946
- Reclassified: MSF-285, 7 February 1955
- Stricken: 1 May 1962
- Fate: Transferred to Mexican Navy, 1963

History

Mexico
- Name: ARM DM-07
- Acquired: 1963
- Fate: unknown

General characteristics
- Class & type: Admirable-class minesweeper
- Displacement: 650 long tons (660 t)
- Length: 184 ft 6 in (56.24 m)
- Beam: 33 ft (10 m)
- Draft: 9 ft 9 in (2.97 m)
- Propulsion: 2 × ALCO 539 diesel engines, 1,710 shp (1,280 kW); Farrel-Birmingham single reduction gear; 2 shafts
- Speed: 15 knots (28 km/h)
- Complement: 104
- Armament: 1 × 3"/50 caliber (76 mm) DP gun; 2 × twin Bofors 40 mm guns; 1 × Hedgehog anti-submarine mortar; 2 × Depth charge tracks

Service record
- Part of: U.S. Pacific Fleet (1944–1946); Atlantic Reserve Fleet (1946–1962); Mexican Navy (from 1963)
- Operations: Battle of Okinawa
- Awards: 3 Battle stars

USS Recruit (AM-285) was an Admirable-class minesweeper built for the United States Navy during World War II. She was awarded 3 battle stars for service in the Pacific during World War II. She was decommissioned in August 1946 and placed in reserve. While she remained in reserve, Recruit was reclassified as MSF-285 in February 1955 but never reactivated. In 1963, she was sold to the Mexican Navy and renamed ARM DM-07. Although she is reported out of service, her ultimate fate is not reported in secondary sources.

== U.S. Navy career ==
Recruit was laid down by the General Engineering & Dry Dock Co., Alameda, California, 24 May 1943; launched 11 December 1943 sponsored by Miss Kathleen Merrit Jackson and commissioned 8 November 1944. Following shakedown off San Pedro, California, Recruit steamed 5 January 1945 for Pearl Harbor, whence she escorted two convoys to Eniwetok. From there she proceeded with the second convoy to Ulithi arriving 9 March. Ten days later Recruit departed Ulithi with task group TG 52.5 for Okinawa. From the 24th to the 27th, she conducted clearance sweeps south of Tokashiki Island, Kerama Retto, then shifted to Okinawa for a pre-invasion sweep off the western beaches. After the invasion she operated north of Ie Shima, then returned to the Kerama Retto area.

On 6 April, off the northern tip of Okinawa Shima, Recruit fought off several aerial attacks, splashing three planes, and rescuing crewmen from USS Rodman (DMS-21) and USS Emmons (DMS-22), damaged by kamikaze planes. The rest of April was spent in conducting clearance sweeps in the Kerama Retto and Tonachi Shima areas. On 4 May Recruit retired briefly to Ulithi, returning to Okinawa 4 June for screening operations around the transport areas off Okinawa, then conducted antisubmarine patrol off Zampa Misaki.

On 4 July, Recruit took part in one of the largest sweeping operations ever undertaken in Pacific waters, the 50-ship sweep in the Operation Juneau area of the East China Sea. Recruit swept 15 mines in this operation. In August she took part in a sweep of the Operation Skagway area of the northern East China Sea, sweeping 15 more mines.

On 31 August, after Japan had capitulated, Recruit, as part of task unit TU 95.4.31, departed Okinawa, en route to Tsugaru Strait, Northern Honshū and after sweeping a channel into Mutsu Kaiwan, moved on to Ominato Ko, anchoring there 8 September with other units of the North Pacific Force. From then until 20 October, the task group swept mines in the Tsugaru Strait.

On 20 October, Recruit, in company with TU 56.4.1, sailed for Sasebo, arriving on the 26th. On 3 November she proceeded to Hiro Wan, Honshū. Arriving two days later, she acted as pilot vessel between Hiro Wan and Kure Ko for the remainder of the month. On 1 December, Recruit returned to Sasebo, whence she got underway for the United States, 28 December.

She returned to San Pedro, California, 15 February by way of Saipan and Pearl Harbor, transited the Panama Canal Zone 24 March and reached Orange, Texas, 3 April, where she decommissioned 15 August 1946. Recruit earned three battle stars for World War II service.

While she remained in reserve, Recruit was reclassified MSF-285 on 7 February 1955. She was moved to Green Cove Springs, Florida, 29 May 1958 where she remained until struck from the Naval Vessel Register on 1 May 1962. In 1963, she was sold to Mexico.

== Mexican Navy career ==
The former Recruit was acquired by the Mexican Navy in 1963 and renamed ARM DM-07. Although she is reported out of service, her ultimate fate is not reported in secondary sources.
