= USS Rebel =

Minesweeper of the United States Navy

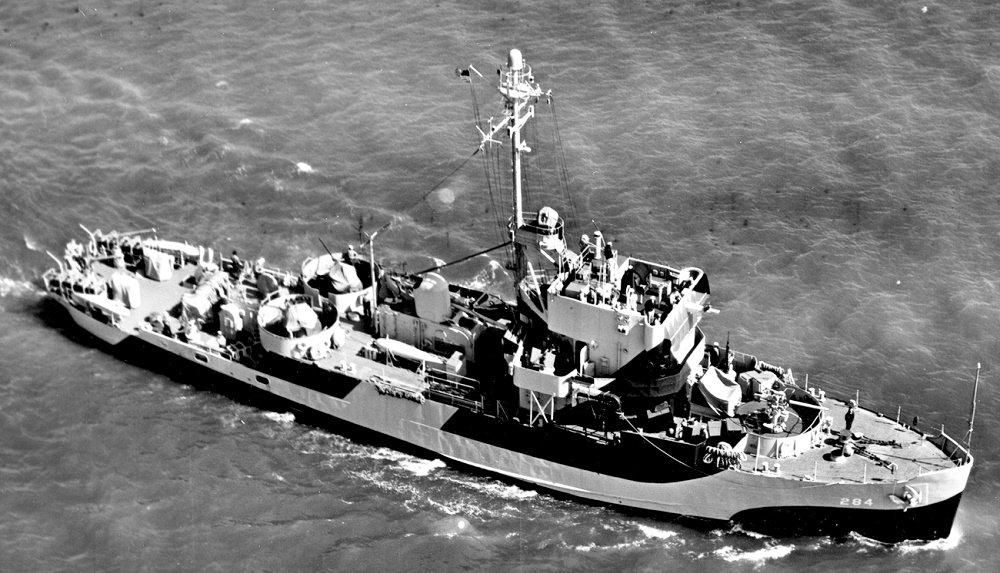
- Rebel underway in San Francisco Bay on 18 September 1944

History

United States
- Name: USS Rebel (AM-284)
- Builder: General Engineering & Dry Dock Company, Alameda, California
- Laid down: 10 May 1943
- Launched: 28 October 1943
- Sponsored by: Mrs. C. E. Guisness
- Commissioned: 12 September 1944
- Decommissioned: 12 June 1946
- Reclassified: MSF-284, 7 February 1955
- Stricken: 1 May 1962
- Fate: Transferred to Mexican Navy, October 1962

History

Mexico
- Name: ARM DM-14
- Acquired: October 1962
- Renamed: ARM Cadete Fernando Montes de Oca (C57), 1994
- Namesake: Fernando Montes de Oca
- Stricken: 16 July 2001
- Fate: unknown

General characteristics
- Class & type: Admirable-class minesweeper
- Displacement: 650 long tons (660 t)
- Length: 184 ft 6 in (56.24 m)
- Beam: 33 ft (10 m)
- Draft: 9 ft 9 in (2.97 m)
- Propulsion: 2 × ALCO 539 diesel engines, 1,710 shp (1,280 kW); Farrel-Birmingham single reduction gear; 2 shafts
- Speed: 15 knots (28 km/h)
- Complement: 104
- Armament: 1 × 3"/50 caliber (76 mm) DP gun; 2 × twin Bofors 40 mm guns; 1 × Hedgehog anti-submarine mortar; 2 × Depth charge tracks

Service record
- Part of: U.S. Pacific Fleet (1946–1946); Atlantic Reserve Fleet (1946–1962); Mexican Navy (1962–2001)
- Operations: Battle of Iwo Jima; Battle of Okinawa
- Awards: 4 Battle stars

USS Rebel (AM-284) was an Admirable-class minesweeper built for the United States Navy during World War II. She was awarded four battle stars for service in the Pacific during World War II. She was decommissioned in June 1946 and placed in reserve. While she remained in reserve, Rebel was reclassified as MSF-284 in February 1955 but never reactivated. In October 1962, she was sold to the Mexican Navy and renamed ARM DM-14. In 1994, she was renamed ARM Cadete Fernando Montes de Oca (C57). She was stricken in July 2001, but her ultimate fate is not reported in secondary sources.

== U.S. Navy career ==
Rebel was laid down by the General Engineering & Dry Dock Co., Alameda, California, on 10 May 1943 and launched on 28 October 1943, sponsored by Mrs. C. E. Guisness, (Note: While some sources give the sponsor's surname as Guiness, contemporary newspapers and archival documents list the Coast Guard commander's name as Carl E. Guisness.) wife of the commander of the Coast Guard base in Alameda. She was launched the same day and at the same facility as the USS Tawakoni. Rebel was commissioned on 12 September 1944. Following shakedown off the California coast, Rebel steamed for Pearl Harbor on 9 November 1944, arriving nine days later.

On 16 December, she began to escort Hawaii-Eniwetok convoys then proceeded via Tinian, to Iwo Jima where she conducted pre-invasion minesweeping and antisubmarine screening operations despite shore battery fire and plane attacks 16–28 February 1945. Rebel then returned to the Marianas, whence she sailed for Ulithi to stage for Operation Iceberg, the invasion of Okinawa. On 25 March, she arrived off Kerama Retto. She swept the approaches to that anchorage and to the Hagushi beaches until 1 April. Resuming minesweeping operations after the landings on Okinawa, she shot down three Japanese planes on the 6th and on the same day rescued 34 crewmen from USS Rodman (DMS-21) and USS Emmons (DMS-22), both damaged by kamikazes.

Steaming to Ulithi 17 April, Rebel returned to Okinawa 16 May and, for the remainder of the war, operated in the Ryukyus and the East China Sea. At the end of July, she participated in the Operation Juneau pre-invasion sweeps in the East China Sea, sweeping a total of 16 mines. During the Operation Skagway, sweeping operation in August, she swept 12 mines.

On 6 September 1945, Rebel rendezvoused with other ships of the Pacific Fleet 200 miles (320 km) off Honshū and arrived at Tsugaru Strait between Honshū and Hokkaidō the next day and commenced sweeping a channel into Mutsu Bay, Honshū, ahead of the occupation fleet. She anchored at Ominato Naval Base on the 8th. From 16 September to 8 October, Rebel with 11 other AM-class minesweepers, cleared the entrances to Tsugaro Strait and swept off southern Hokkaidō and northern Honshū, with Rebel sweeping 21 mines. She then proceeded to Sasebo, Hiro Wan, and Kochi Eria, Honshū, for further sweeping operations.

On 20 November, she departed Hiro Wan for the United States. Arriving at San Diego, California, on 18 December she continued on and transited the Panama Canal on 29 December, and arrived at New Orleans, Louisiana, on 4 January 1946 to prepare for inactivation. Shifting to Orange, Texas; 11 April 1946, Rebel decommissioned 12 June 1946, and joined the Atlantic Reserve Fleet.

Re-designated MSF-284 on 7 February 1955, Rebel was shifted to the Green Cove Springs, Florida, berthing area in June 1958 and returned to Orange in 1962. Her name was struck from the Navy list on 1 May 1962, and in October 1962 she was sold to Mexico. Rebel earned four battle stars for World War II service.

== Mexican Navy career ==
The former Rebel was acquired by the Mexican Navy in October 1962 and renamed ARM DM-14. In 1994, she was renamed ARM Cadete Fernando Montes de Oca (C57) after Fernando Montes de Oca. She was stricken on 16 July 2001, but her ultimate fate is not reported in secondary sources.
