= USS Impeccable (AM-320) =

Minesweeper of the United States Navy

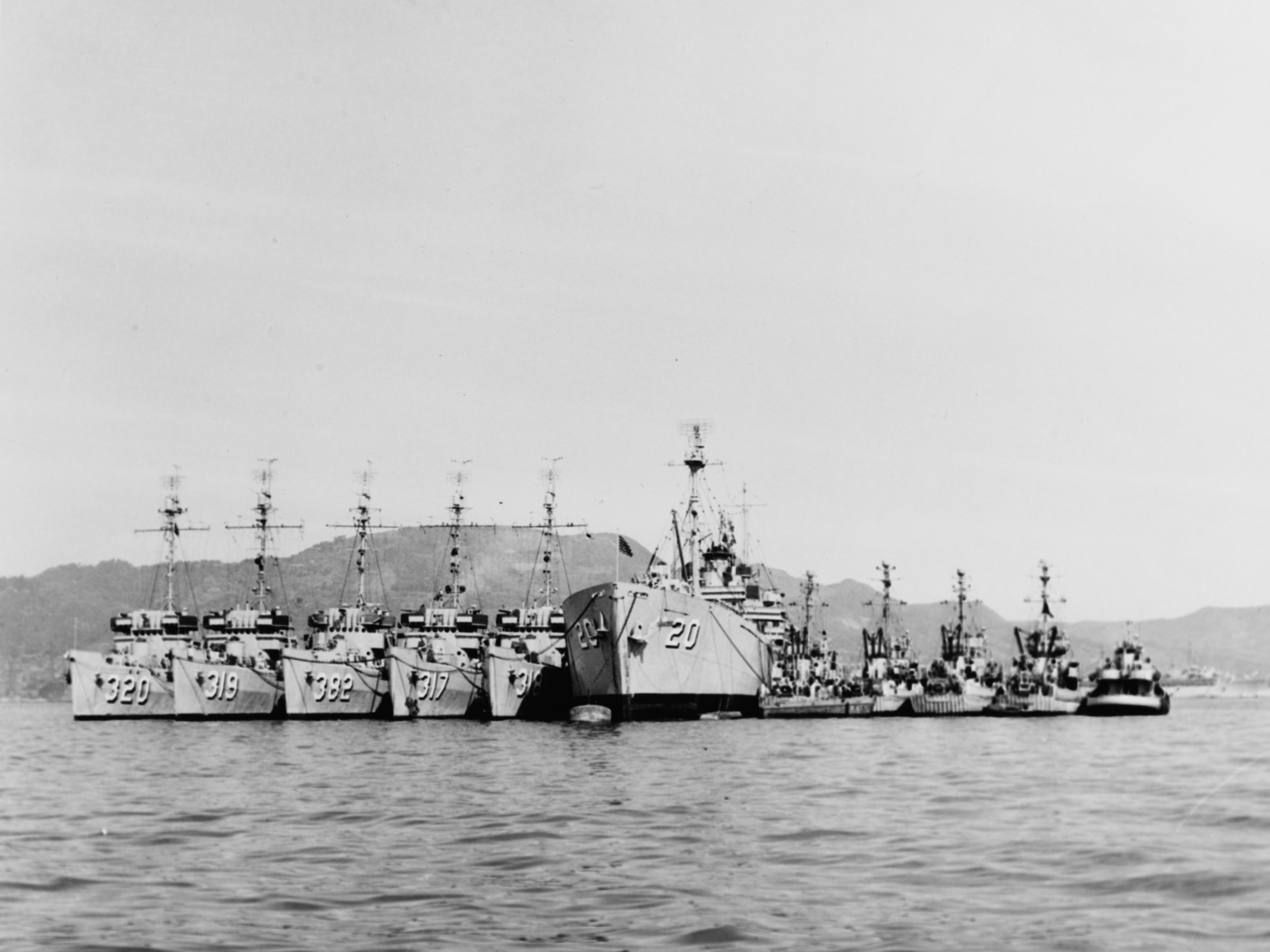
- USS Impeccable (last ship on the left) at Sasebo, Japan, 1952.

History

United States
- Name: HMS Brutus (BAM-7)
- Builder: General Engineering & Dry Dock Company, Alameda, California
- Renamed: USS Impeccable (AM-320), 23 January 1943
- Laid down: 1 February 1943
- Launched: 21 May 1943
- Sponsored by: Mrs. Agnes W. Hanson
- Commissioned: 24 April 1944
- Decommissioned: 27 March 1947
- Recommissioned: 12 March 1952
- Home port: Long Beach, California
- Reclassified: MSF-320, 7 February 1955
- Decommissioned: 14 October 1955, Astoria, Oregon
- Stricken: 1 July 1972
- Honors and awards: three battle stars for World War II service and two for Korean War service
- Fate: placed in reserve, 1955; sold for scrap, 1 April 1974

General characteristics
- Class & type: Auk-class minesweeper
- Displacement: 890 long tons (900 t)
- Length: 221 ft 2 in (67.41 m)
- Beam: 32 ft (9.8 m)
- Draft: 10 ft (3.0 m)
- Propulsion: Baldwin VO8 diesel electric drive engines, Westinghouse single reduction gear, two shafts; 2,976 shp (2,219 kW)
- Speed: 18 knots (33 km/h)
- Complement: 105 officers and enlisted
- Armament: one 3 in (76 mm) dual purpose gun mount, two twin 40 mm gun mounts, two twin 20 mm gun mounts, two depth charge tracks. five depth charge projectiles

USS Impeccable (AM-320) was an Auk-class minesweeper built for the United States Navy during World War II. She was originally ordered as HMS Brutus (BAM-7) for the United Kingdom's Royal Navy under Lend-Lease, but was acquired and renamed by the United States Navy before construction began. She was commissioned in 1944 and served in the Pacific before being decommissioned in 1947. After the outbreak of hostilities in Korea, Impeccable was recommissioned in 1952 and served off Korea through 1952. She was decommissioned for the final time in October 1955 and placed in reserve. She was sold for scrapping in 1974.

== Career ==
Impeccable (AM-320), originally ordered as Brutus (BAM-7) for the Royal Navy, was launched by General Engineering and Dry Dock Co., Alameda, California, 21 May 1943; sponsored by Mrs. Agnes W. Hanson; and commissioned 24 April 1944.

The new minesweeper conducted shakedown training off the California coast before sailing 3 July 1944 on Pacific escort duty. Until November she steamed between Pearl Harbor and the advance base at Eniwetok, and during the last two months of 1944 operated on this duty in the Palaus. After patrol and escort duty out of Ulithi in early 1945, Impeccable departed 19 March 1945 to take part in the amphibious assault on Okinawa.

Arriving off the island 24 March in advance of the landing group, the minesweeper began her critical job of sweeping the approach and transport areas. She underwent air attack 28 March and with the main assault 1 April moved to screening duties. As the Japanese hurled wave after wave of suicide planes at the invasion fleet in a desperate attempt to stop the capture of Okinawa, the crew of the Impeccable frequently manned their guns for long periods.

She underwent air attack at Kerama Retto 6 April, and in the long days that followed patrolled both off the Hagushi beaches and on picket station. On 20 May she went alongside to give assistance to USS Chase, damaged by a kamikaze attack. She also performed rescue duties when other screening and escort ships were damaged by enemy air action. Despite the heavy raids, Okinawa was won, and Impeccable sailed 1 July for Guam.

The veteran minesweeper returned to Okinawa with a resupply convoy from Guam and sailed again 16 August, the day after the surrender of Japan. Despite the end of hostilities, much necessary and dangerous work remained for units of the fleet. Impeccable returned to Okinawa 21 August; then in September and November swept the approaches to Wakayama, Japan, in support of occupation operations.

Impeccable departed Sasebo 20 November, sailing via Pearl Harbor to San Francisco, California, where she arrived 15 December 1945. She remained there until decommissioning at Terminal Island, California 27 March 1947.

Impeccable was recommissioned 12 March 1952 to strengthen American fleet units in Korea, and after shakedown sailed 3 September for Sasebo. She moved immediately to the Wonsan area to strengthen the naval siege and keep the harbor clear of mines. The ship also took part in the amphibious feint at Kojo 12 to 14 October, exchanging fire with shore batteries in the area. On 18 October 1952, USS Impeccable (AM 320) and USS Chief (AM 315) received fire from estimated 105 mm enemy shore batteries located in the vicinity of Sondok. A total of 18 splashes were observed. Sweep gear was cut, and recovered under cover of darkness. No personnel or material casualties were experienced.

During the months that followed Impeccable remained on the eastern coast, aiding the naval blockade and helping to maintain the U.S. position on the offshore islands. She drove a sampan ashore off Hungnam 17 November 1952, and fought with Wonsan batteries 20 February 1953 while covering USS Condor AMS 5 in a minesweeping operation.

Her tour in the Korean War having ended, Impeccable arrived at Pearl Harbor 31 March and her home-port, Long Beach, California, 10 April 1953. For the rest of the year the ship operated on training and readiness exercises off Mexico and the Panama Canal Zone. Impeccable remained on minesweeping and fleet maneuvers through the first half of 1955. Impeccable was reclassified MSF-320 on 7 February 1955.

Impeccable arrived at Astoria, Oregon on 16 August 1955; was decommissioned on 14 October; and entered the Pacific Reserve Fleet at Bremerton, Washington, where she remained until she was struck from the Navy list 1 July 1972 and sold for scrap 1 April 1974.

== Awards and honors ==
Impeccable received three battle stars for World War II service and two for Korean War service.
