= USS Swallow (AM-65) =

Minesweeper of the United States Navy

Coordinates: 26°10′N 127°12′E

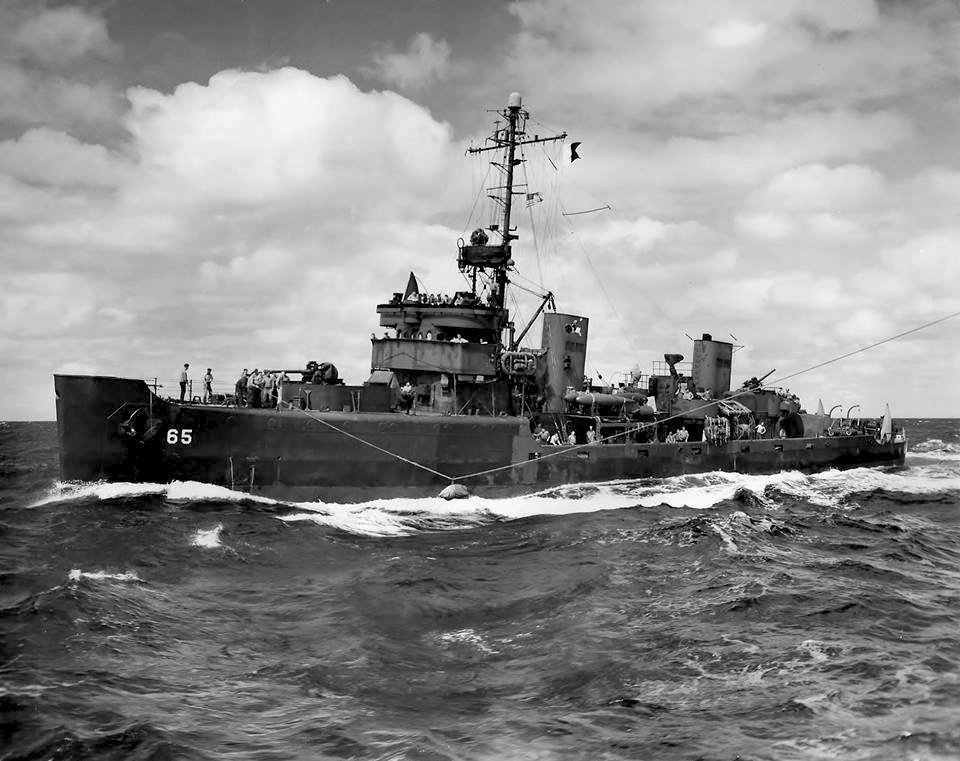

History

United States
- Name: USS Swallow (AM-65)
- Namesake: swallow
- Builder: General Engineering & Dry Dock Company, Alameda, California
- Laid down: 19 July 1941
- Launched: 6 May 1942
- Commissioned: 14 January 1943
- Stricken: 2 June 1945
- Honours and awards: 2 battle stars (World War II)
- Fate: Sunk by kamikaze aircraft near Okinawa, 22 April 1945

General characteristics
- Class & type: Auk-class minesweeper
- Displacement: 890 long tons (904 t)
- Length: 220 ft 3 in (67.13 m)
- Beam: 32 ft 2 in (9.80 m)
- Draft: 10 ft 9 in (3.28 m)
- Speed: 18 knots (33 km/h; 21 mph)
- Complement: 100 officers and enlisted
- Armament: 1 × 3"/50 caliber gun; 2 × 40 mm guns; 2 × 20 mm guns; 2 × Depth charge tracks

USS Swallow (AM-65) was an Auk-class minesweeper built for the United States Navy during World War II. The ship was the second U.S. Navy ship named after the swallow. Swallow earned two battle stars for World War II service. She was sunk by a kamikaze aircraft off Okinawa on 22 April 1945. She was struck from the Naval Vessel Register on 2 June 1945.

== Career ==
Swallow (AM-65) was laid down on 19 July 1941 by the General Engineering & Dry Dock Company of Alameda, California; launched on 6 May 1942; and commissioned on 14 January 1943.

Swallow completed fitting out at San Francisco, California, and, on 2 March, got underway for Pearl Harbor, where she arrived on the 13th. After almost a month of exercises in Hawaiian waters, she stood out of Pearl Harbor for the Central Pacific. On 7 May, she reached Ebon Atoll in the Marshall Islands. The minesweeper remained in the Marshalls until 24 May, when she sailed for New Caledonia. She entered the harbor at Noumea on 30 May. For the remainder of the year, she escorted convoys steaming among the various American bases in the South Pacific. During that period, she made several visits to Espiritu Santo in the New Hebrides Islands, and voyaged once each to Efate and Fiji.

On 17 December 1943, the minesweeper set out upon her first voyage to the Solomon Islands. She arrived in Purvis Bay, Florida Island, on 3 January 1944. Until April, she escorted supply echelons to and between the Solomon Islands, first concentrating on Guadalcanal, and then, as the American forces began to climb the Solomons ladder, branched out to the other islands, notably to the Russell Islands subgroup and to Bougainville. She also periodically made voyages back to Nouméa and Espiritu Santo. She underwent repairs there in April and returned to the Solomons on 10 May.

By late May, she was operating in the vicinity of Tassafaronga, whence she departed on 4 June. Swallow reached Kwajalein atoll on 8 June, joined Task Force 53, refueled, and got underway again on the 12th. The Southern Attack Force, otherwise known as Task Force (TF) 53, was assigned the job of retaking Guam during the Marianas operation. Originally the Guam assault was to have come several days after that upon Saipan. However, the invasion of the island was delayed by the Battle of the Philippine Sea and by the realization that additional troops would be needed for the operation. Thus, TF 53 steamed around in the ocean 150 to 300 miles east of Saipan until 25 June when Admiral Spruance ordered the bulk of it to Eniwetok to await additional forces from Hawaii. Swallow arrived in Eniwetok lagoon three days later.

She remained at Eniwetok until 17 July, when the task force sortied for Guam. Arriving off Apra Harbor on the 21st, Swallow took up her screening station and, for almost two months, screened ships and patrolled in the vicinity. On 3 September, she joined the escort of a convoy bound for Eniwetok. She arrived there on the 9th and sailed for Pearl Harbor two days later. She spent the night of 21/22 September at Pearl Harbor; then continued on to San Francisco, California, where she arrived on the 30th. She immediately commenced overhaul at the General Engineering & Dry Dock Co., Alameda, California, Swallow completed overhaul and trials a few days before Christmas, departed San Francisco, California on 22 December, and reached San Diego, California, on Christmas Eve. For a little more than a month, the minesweeper operated out of San Diego, California.

On 1 February 1945, Swallow headed back to the western Pacific. She spent ten days, 9 to 19 February, conducting exercises in Hawaiian waters in preparation for the invasion of Okinawa. On the 19th, Swallow stood out of Pearl Harbor and joined the screen of a convoy bound for Eniwetok. She entered the lagoon on 2 March and headed for the Marianas the following day. Following a brief stop at Saipan on the 6th, the minesweeper continued on to Ulithi, where she trained in preparation for the invasion of Okinawa.

On 19 March, Swallow and the rest of Task Group 52.3 sortied from Ulithi lagoon. Five days later, she arrived off Okinawa and commenced a week of mine-sweeping operations to clear the approach to the beaches for landing ships and craft. Each night she retired to a relatively safe area far offshore. On 1 April, when the assault waves rolled ashore, Swallow shifted from minesweeping duties to antisubmarine patrols and, but for two runs to Kerama Retto for supplies, continued that duty until 22 April. At 18:58 on that day, a Japanese kamikaze suicide plane swooped down out of heavy clouds and crashed into Swallow's starboard side, amidships, just above the waterline. Both engine rooms were flooded, and the minesweeper immediately took a 45° list to starboard. The order to abandon ship was given at 19:01. Three minutes later, she capsized and sank in 85 fathoms (510 ft; 155 m) of water. Swallow's name was struck from the Naval Vessel Register on 2 June 1945. She earned two battle stars during World War II.

On 10 July 1957, 12 years after Swallow's sinking, the Secretary of the Navy authorized the donation of her sunken hulk to the government of the Ryukyu Islands.
