= USS Reform =

Minesweeper of the United States Navy

History

United States
- Name: USS Reform (AM-286)
- Builder: General Engineering & Dry Dock Company, Alameda, California
- Laid down: 24 June 1943
- Launched: 25 January 1944
- Commissioned: 28 February 1945
- Decommissioned: 9 November 1946
- Fate: Transferred to the Republic of China, 15 June 1948
- Stricken: 13 July 1948

History

Taiwan
- Name: unknown
- Acquired: 15 June 1948
- Fate: Scrapped in 1950

General characteristics
- Class & type: Admirable-class minesweeper
- Displacement: 650 tons
- Length: 184 ft 6 in (56.24 m)
- Beam: 33 ft (10 m)
- Draft: 9 ft 9 in (2.97 m)
- Propulsion: 2 × ALCO 539 diesel engines, 1,710 shp (1,280 kW); Farrel-Birmingham single reduction gear; 2 shafts
- Speed: 14.8 knots (27.4 km/h)
- Complement: 104
- Armament: 1 × 3"/50 caliber gun DP; 2 × twin Bofors 40 mm guns; 1 × Hedgehog anti-submarine mortar; 2 × Depth charge tracks

Service record
- Part of: US Pacific Fleet (1945-1946)
- Awards: 3 Battle stars

USS Reform (AM-286) was an Admirable-class minesweeper built for the U.S. Navy during World War II. She was built to clear minefields in offshore waters, and served the Navy in the Pacific Ocean before voyaging to the U.S. East Coast for decommissioning. Post-war, her crew returned home with three battle stars to their credit. The ship itself, its wartime mission complete, was given to China.

== Career ==
Reform was laid down 24 June 1943 by the General Engineering & Dry Dock Company, of Alameda, California; launched 29 January 1944; sponsored by Mrs. Roland H. McCune of San Francisco, California; and commissioned 28 February 1945.

After shakedown out of San Pedro, Santa Barbara, and San Diego, California, she sailed for the forward area to join the fleet 28 April. Touching at Guam, she sailed 18 June for Ulithi, and thence escorted a convoy to Okinawa, arriving Buckner Bay 26 June. The first week of July she commenced minesweeping operations in the East China Sea.

In June she assisted in sweeping the approaches to Jinsen, Korea, and by September she was sweeping the approaches to Sasebo, Japan. Reform rode out two typhoons in Sasebo Harbor, suffering only minor damage to her port shaft and screw when she was driven into a mooring buoy. Repairs were completed by 5 November. After a check sweep in the Yellow Sea off Korea, she again took up operations off the southwestern coast of Kyūshū, and these continued until she was ordered home.

Departing Japan 12 February 1946, she arrived San Pedro, California, 28 March. Designated for transfer to the Chinese Navy, she sailed for Subic Bay, Philippine Islands, and decommissioned there 9 November 1946. She was delivered to the Chinese Navy 15 June 1948, and struck from the Navy list 13 July 1948. She was scrapped in 1950.

Reform received three battle stars for World War II service
