= USS Oracle =

Minesweeper of the United States Navy

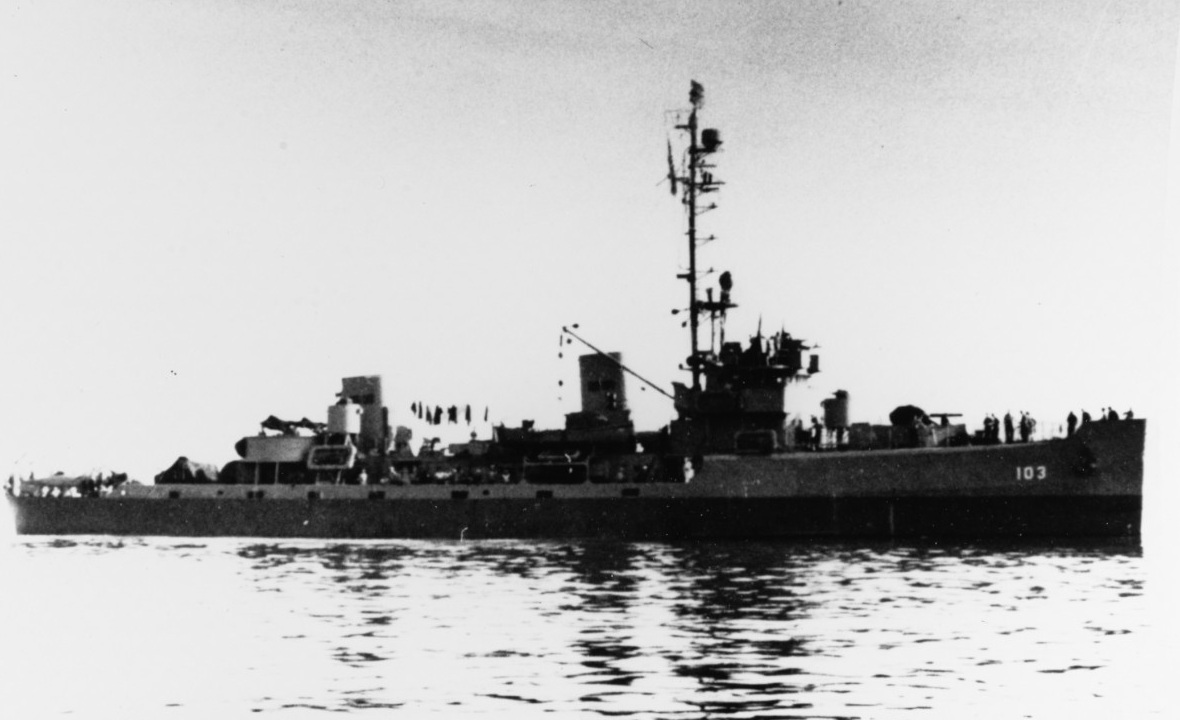

History

United States
- Name: USS Oracle (AM-103)
- Builder: General Engineering & Dry Dock Company, Alameda, California
- Laid down: 7 May 1942
- Launched: 30 September 1942
- Commissioned: 14 May 1943
- Decommissioned: 29 May 1946
- Reclassified: MSF-103, 7 February 1955
- Stricken: 1 December 1966
- Fate: Destroyed as a target, 1967

General characteristics
- Class & type: Auk-class minesweeper
- Displacement: 890 long tons (904 t)
- Length: 221 ft 3 in (67.44 m)
- Beam: 32 ft (9.8 m)
- Draft: 10 ft 9 in (3.28 m)
- Speed: 18 knots (33 km/h; 21 mph)
- Complement: 100 officers and enlisted
- Armament: 1 × 3"/50 caliber gun; 2 × 40 mm guns; 2 × 20 mm guns; 2 × Depth charge tracks

USS Oracle (AM-103) was an Auk-class minesweeper built for the United States Navy during World War II. She was commissioned in May 1943 and decommissioned in May 1946. She was placed in reserve and remained there until struck from the Naval Vessel Register in December 1966. She was sunk as a target in 1967.

== Career ==
Oracle was laid down by the General Engineering & Dry Dock Company of Alameda, California, 7 May 1942; launched 30 September 1942; sponsored by Mrs. Sadie L. Jones; and commissioned 14 May 1943.

Getting underway from Alameda, California on 27 June, Oracle steamed to Adak, Alaska, to spend the next five months in towing, escort, patrol, salvage, and survey operations in the Aleutians area. She furnished minesweeping and antisubmarine screening support for the occupation of Kiska 15 to 22 August.

Departing Adak 1 December, Oracle arrived at Pearl Harbor the 10th. On her first operation in the central Pacific Ocean, the invasion of Majuro Atoll, Marshalls, 31 January to 3 February 1944, she swept landing channels and took soundings for chart preparation. Oracle then proceeded to Kwajalein, arriving the next day for antisubmarine patrol until the 14th. On 15 February Oracle got underway in convoy for Eniwetok, arriving two days later to mark the channel for the landing craft assault that same day. She again patrolled against enemy submarines until she departed Eniwetok on 12 April for Pearl Harbor.

Following training from 20 April until 29 May for the invasion of Saipan, Oracle returned to the Marshalls to join a task group off Eniwetok on 14 June. The minesweeper arrived off Tanapag Harbor, Saipan, the next day for minesweeping and screening before moving on to Magicienne Bay. On 10 July Oracle rescued two Japanese survivors on a makeshift raft off Saipan. By the 24th the ship was off Tinian for the landings and mop-up operations to 4 August. She spent most of September patrolling off the southern Marianas before escorting the tanker Giraffe (IX-118) to Guam, arriving the 20th.

From 1 to 10 October Oracle was on emergency chemical smoke watch off Apra Harbor, Guam, to protect shipping from Japanese air attack. She continued service off Guam and in operations to Ulithi until proceeding to Okinawa. Patrolling there on 6 May she assisted in shooting down three Japanese planes. On 14 May Oracle departed Guam for the U.S. West Coast, via Pearl Harbor, arriving Seattle, Washington, 6 July. Fighting stopped during overhaul. Oracle got underway for Pearl Harbor on 29 August, arriving 5 September. Reporting to Sasebo, Japan, 5 November, she participated in the mine clearance of the Formosa Straits area, until 23 December when she reached Shanghai, China. On 3 January 1946 Oracle departed Shanghai for Pearl Harbor, via Sasebo, arriving the 31st.

The minesweeper Oracle steamed for home in the spring of 1946, arriving San Diego, California, to be decommissioned on 29 May and enter the Pacific Reserve Fleet there. On 7 February 1955 Oracle was redesignated MSF–103. On 1 December 1966 the Oracle was struck from the Naval Vessel Register. The fleet minesweeper was stripped and used as a target for the Pacific Fleet in the winter of 1967.
