= USS Competent (AM-316) =

Minesweeper of the United States Navy

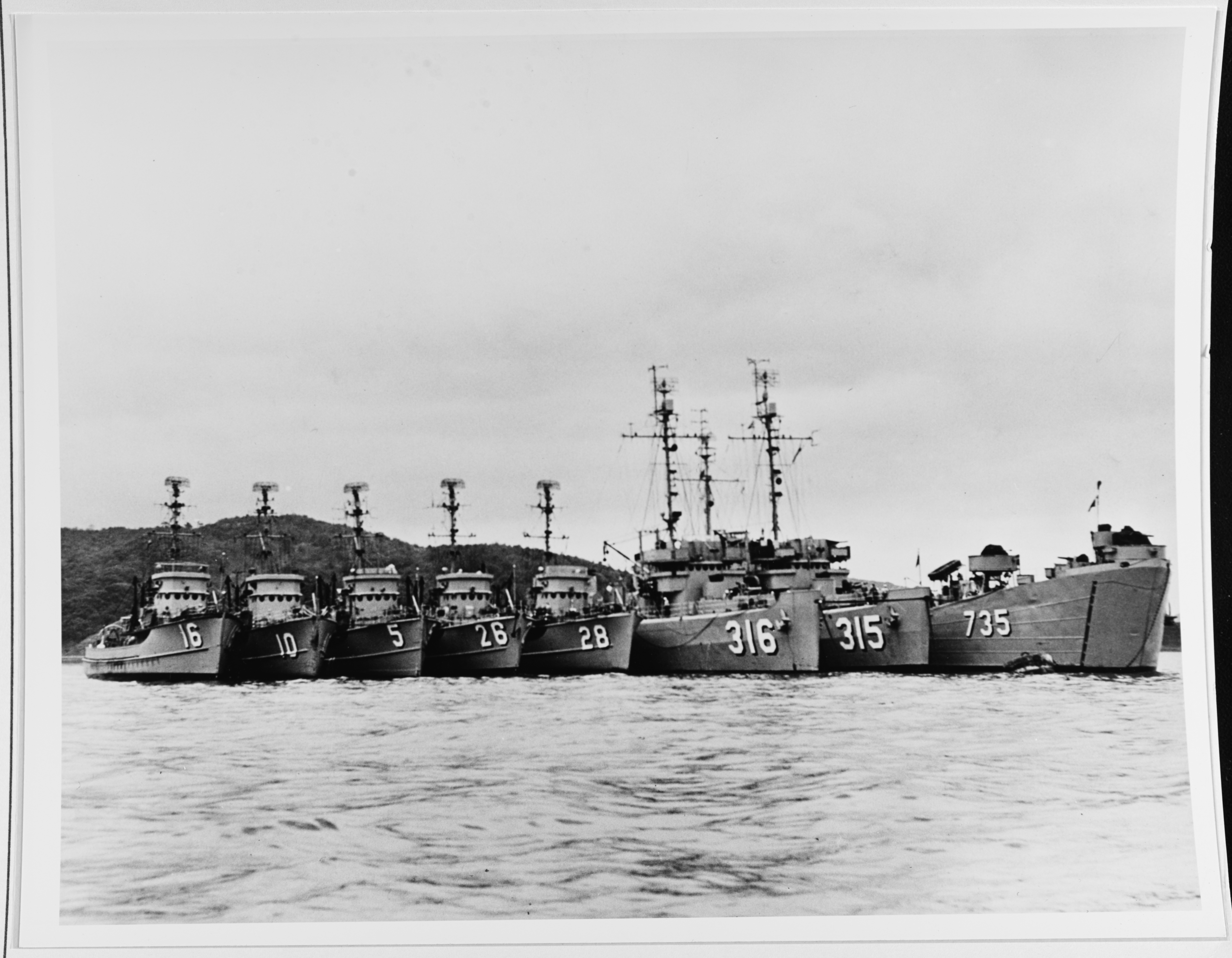
- Competent (third ship from right) among six other minesweepers and mothership LST-735.

History

United States
- Name: HMS Amelia (BAM-3)
- Builder: General Engineering & Dry Dock Company, Alameda, California
- Laid down: 19 August 1942
- Launched: 30 January 1943
- Renamed: USS Competent (AM-315), 23 January 1943
- Commissioned: 10 November 1943
- Decommissioned: 30 January 1947
- Recommissioned: 29 February 1952
- Reclassified: MSF-316, 7 February 1955
- Decommissioned: 15 April 1955
- Stricken: 1972
- Honors and awards: 5 battle stars (World War II); 2 battle stars (Korea)
- Fate: Sold to Mexico, September 1972

History

Mexico
- Name: ARM Ponciano Arriaga
- Namesake: Ponciano Arriaga
- Acquired: February 1973
- Reclassified: G04
- Stricken: 1988
- Fate: Unknown

General characteristics
- Class & type: Auk-class minesweeper
- Displacement: 890 long tons (904 t)
- Length: 221 ft 3 in (67.44 m)
- Beam: 32 ft (9.8 m)
- Draft: 10 ft 9 in (3.28 m)
- Speed: 18 knots (33 km/h; 21 mph)
- Complement: 100 officers and enlisted
- Armament: 1 × 3"/50 caliber gun; 2 × 40 mm guns; 2 × 20 mm guns; 2 × Depth charge tracks

USS Competent (AM-316/MSF-316) was an Auk-class minesweeper acquired by the United States Navy. Competent was a U.S. Navy oceangoing minesweeper, named after the word "competent", meaning adequate, capable, or fit.

HMS Amelia (BAM-3) was launched 30 January 1943 by General Engineering and Dry Dock Co., Alameda, California sponsored by Miss M. S. Upton; retained for use by the U.S. Navy; assigned the name Competent and reclassified AM-316, 23 January 1943; and commissioned 10 November 1943.

== Service history ==
=== World War II ===
Competent arrived in Pearl Harbor on 21 January 1944. Eight days later she departed to escort munitions carrier USS Sangay (AE-10) to Majuro, where Competent swept mines and acted as harbor entrance control and pilot ship from 5 February to 31 March. Returning to Pearl Harbor 7 April she continued to escort convoys to the Marshalls until 15 July. Competent reached Port Purvis on Florida Island, in the Solomons, on 24 August for exercises in the area until 8 September when she sailed to Kossol Passage to sweep and patrol the west entrance during the invasion of Peleliu. She escorted a convoy back to Port Purvis 13 October, and on 2 November departed for a U.S. West Coast overhaul.

On 8 April 1945 Competent cleared San Francisco, California, with a convoy bound for Okinawa. From her arrival 20 May she patrolled and screened the transports, then swept mines from 5 July to 25 August. During September she lay at Okinawa, then swept off Chusan Archipelago during October. She operated out of Sasebo, Japan, on various duties in support of the occupation until 6 March 1946 when she cleared for San Francisco, California, arriving 21 April. She operated on the west coast until placed out of commission in reserve 30 January 1947 at Pacific Reserve Fleet, Long Beach.

=== Korean War ===
Recommissioned 29 February 1952 as a result of the Korean War, Competent put to sea from Long Beach, California, 7 July and arrived at Sasebo, Japan, 7 August. From this port she swept and patrolled Korean waters until returning to Long Beach, California 5 February 1953. During her second Far Eastern tour from 5 October 1953 to 2 June 1954, she patrolled with task force TF 95 off Korea to preserve the truce.

=== Decommissioning and sale ===
Reclassified MSF-316, 7 February 1955, Competent operated along the west coast until she was decommissioned and placed in reserve 15 April 1955. After seventeen years in "mothballs", she was sold to Mexico in September 1972. She served in the Mexican Navy as ARM Ponciano Arriaga until 1988.

== Awards ==
Competent earned five battle stars for World War II service and two battle stars for the Korean War.
