= USS Ebony =

Ship from the US Navy

History

United States
- Name: USS Ebony (YN-10)
- Namesake: ebony
- Builder: General Engineering & Dry Dock Company, Alameda, California
- Launched: 3 June 1941
- Sponsored by: Mrs. Clara Valtey
- In service: 16 September 1941
- Commissioned: 22 May 1942
- Reclassified: AN-15, 20 January 1944
- Decommissioned: 23 March 1946, at Astoria, Oregon
- Stricken: 1 September 1962
- Fate: Scrapped, 1976

General characteristics
- Class & type: Aloe-class net laying ship
- Tonnage: 560 tons
- Displacement: 850 tons
- Length: 163 ft 2 in (49.73 m)
- Beam: 30 ft 6 in (9.30 m)
- Draft: 11 ft 8 in (3.56 m)
- Speed: 12.5 knots (23.2 km/h)
- Complement: 40 officers and enlisted
- Armament: one single 3 in (76 mm) gun mount, three 20 mm guns, one y-gun

USS Ebony (YN-10/AN-15) was an Aloe-class net laying ship built for the United States Navy during World War II. She was launched in June 1941, and completed in September 1941. Placed in service at that time without being commissioned, she was commissioned in May 1942, and decommissioned in March 1946. She was placed in reserve in 1946 and scrapped in 1976.

== Career ==
Ebony (YN-10) was launched 3 June 1941 by the General Engineering & Dry Dock Company of Alameda, California; sponsored by Mrs. Clara Valtey; placed in service 16 September 1941 for duty in the 12th Naval District; and commissioned 22 May 1942. Ebony sailed from San Francisco, California, 24 May 1942 for the South Pacific Ocean. After a brief period in the Fiji Islands, she arrived at Auckland, New Zealand, 27 July, to serve as net gate tender.

She sailed to Noumea in January 1943 to assist in towing a stranded vessel to safety and remained until May to salvage Shaw (DD-373). Ebony continued her net tending in the South Pacific, based primarily at Nouméa and Espiritu Santo, until the end of the war. During this time, she was reclassified AN-15 on 20 January 1944.

She returned to San Pedro, California, 8 October 1945, and was placed out of commission in reserve at Astoria, Oregon, 23 March 1946. She was struck from the Naval Vessel Register on 1 September 1962 and scrapped in 1976.
