= USS Reign =

Minesweeper of the United States Navy

History

United States
- Name: USS Reign (AM-288)
- Builder: General Engineering & Dry Dock Company, Alameda, California
- Laid down: 30 October 1943
- Launched: 29 May 1944
- Acquired: 11 October 1946
- Reclassified: MSF-288, 7 February 1955
- Stricken: 1 November 1959
- Fate: unknown

General characteristics
- Class & type: Admirable-class minesweeper
- Displacement: 650 tons
- Length: 184 ft 6 in (56.24 m)
- Beam: 33 ft (10 m)
- Draft: 9 ft 9 in (2.97 m)
- Propulsion: 2 × ALCO 539 diesel engines, 1,710 shp (1.3 MW); Farrel-Birmingham single reduction gear; 2 shafts
- Speed: 14.8 knots (27.4 km/h)
- Complement: 104
- Armament: 1 × 3"/50 caliber gun DP; 2 × twin Bofors 40 mm guns; 1 × Hedgehog anti-submarine mortar; 2 × Depth charge tracks

Service record
- Part of: Pacific Reserve Fleet (1944-1959)

Reign (AM-288) was an Admirable-class minesweeper built for the U.S. Navy during World War II. She was built at the General Engineering & Dry Dock Company, of Alameda, California and completed in 1946, but she was never commissioned. Reign remained in the Pacific Reserve Fleet until struck from the Navy list 1 November 1959. During that time, however, she was redesignated MSF-288 on 7 February 1955.
