= USAS Report =

Minesweeper of the United States Navy

History

United States
- Name: USS Report (AM-289)
- Builder: General Engineering & Dry Dock Company, Alameda, California
- Laid down: 14 December 1943
- Launched: 8 August 1944
- Completed: 12 July 1945
- Acquired: July 1945
- Commissioned: never commissioned; placed in reserve upon completion
- Reclassified: MSF-289, 7 July 1955
- Stricken: 1 April 1963; transferred to U.S. Army
- Renamed: USAS Report (AGP-289)
- Fate: returned to U.S. Navy, 1967; loaned to South Korea

History

South Korea
- Name: Kojin (PCE-50)
- Acquired: 1967
- Decommissioned: after 1970
- Fate: Scrapped, 1973

General characteristics
- Class & type: Admirable-class minesweeper
- Displacement: 650 tons
- Length: 184 ft 6 in (56.24 m)
- Beam: 33 ft (10 m)
- Draft: 9 ft 9 in (2.97 m)
- Propulsion: 2 × ALCO 539 diesel engines, 1,710 shp (1.3 MW); Farrel-Birmingham single reduction gear; 2 shafts
- Speed: 14.8 knots (27.4 km/h)
- Complement: 104
- Armament: 1 × 3"/50 caliber gun DP; 2 × twin Bofors 40 mm guns; 1 × Hedgehog anti-submarine mortar; 2 × Depth charge tracks

USAS Report (AGP-289) was an Admirable-class minesweeper built for the United States Navy during World War II as USS Report (AM-289). Although completed in July 1945, before the end of hostilities, she was placed in reserve and never commissioned into the U.S. Navy. She was reclassified as MSF-289 in February 1955, but remained in reserve until she was struck from the Naval Vessel Register in 1963. She was transferred to the United States Army and served U.S. Army Intelligence from 1963 to 1967 as a motor torpedo boat tender. Report was returned to U.S. Navy custody and loaned to South Korea. As ROKS Kojin (PCE-50) in Republic of Korea Navy service, she served through 1970 and was scrapped in 1973.

== Career ==
Report was laid down at the General Engineering & Dry Dock Company of Alameda, California, on 14 December 1943. She was launched on 8 August 1944, completed, and delivered to the U.S. Navy on 12 July 1945. Since the ship's construction was completed just before the end of World War II, she was found to be redundant and Report was never commissioned. She was reclassified as MSF-289 on 7 February 1955 while in reserve. She was struck from the Naval Register 1 April 1963.

After being struck by the Navy, she was loaned to the U.S. Army and reclassified by the Army as a Motor Torpedo Boat Tender, USAS Report (AGP-289). She was operated in Korean waters as the mother ship to a small flotilla of boats operated under the auspices of U.S. Army Intelligence. Comments by ex-crew members during this period are found at "Report 1966–1967".

She was returned to U.S. Navy custody in early 1967, and then transferred to South Korea, on loan, as Kojin (PCE-50). She served that country into 1970 and was scrapped in 1973.
