= USS Heed =

Minesweeper of the United States Navy

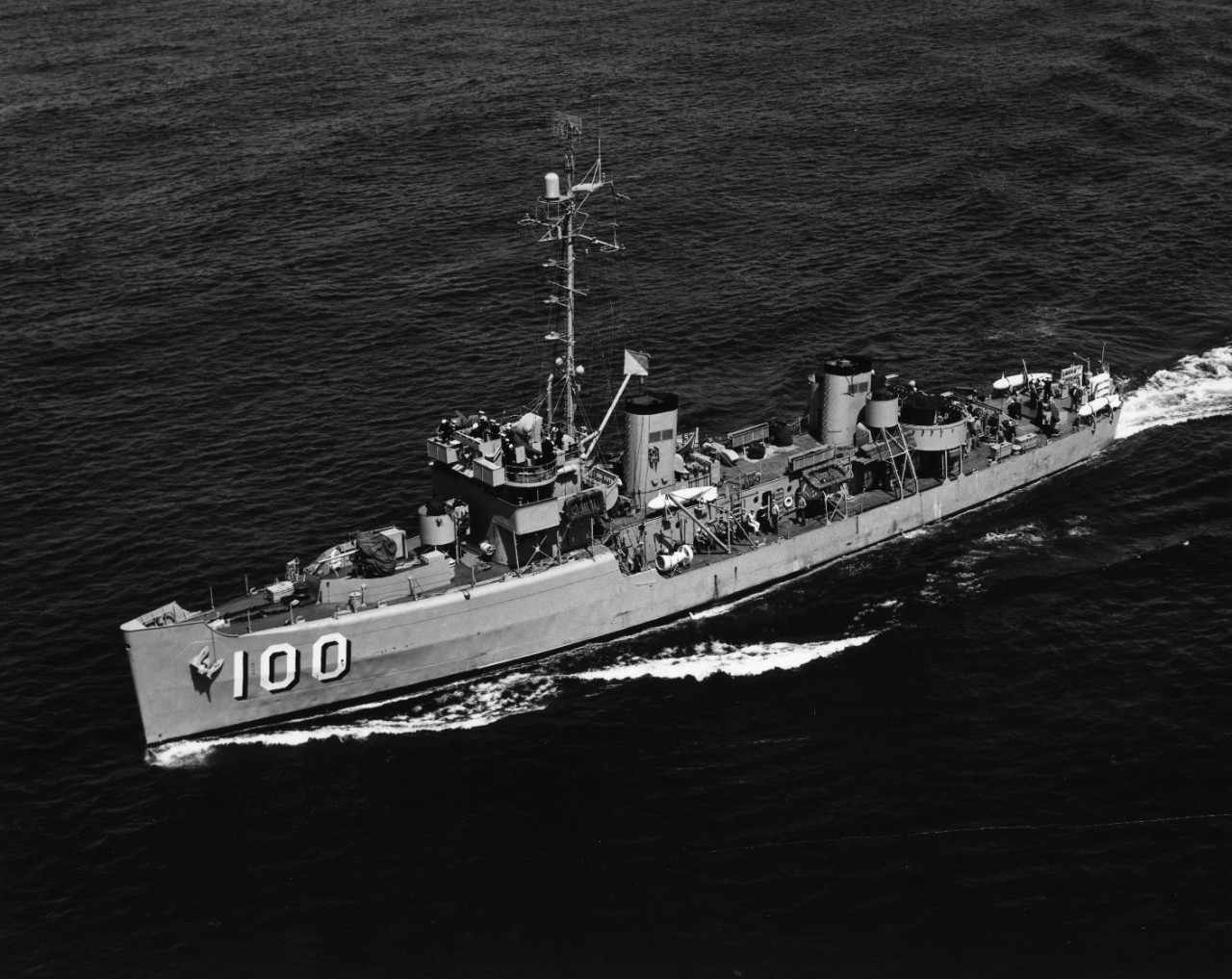
- USS Heed at an unspecified date

History

United States
- Name: USS Heed (AM-100)
- Builder: General Engineering & Dry Dock Company, Alameda, California
- Launched: 19 June 1942
- Commissioned: 27 February 1943
- Decommissioned: 15 January 1947
- Recommissioned: 5 March 1952
- Decommissioned: 27 January 1954
- Reclassified: MSF-100, 7 February 1955
- Stricken: 1 March 1967
- Honours and awards: 5 battle stars (World War II)

General characteristics
- Class & type: Auk-class minesweeper
- Displacement: 890 long tons (904 t)
- Length: 220 ft 3 in (67.13 m)
- Beam: 32 ft 2 in (9.80 m)
- Draft: 10 ft 9 in (3.28 m)
- Speed: 18 knots (33 km/h; 21 mph)
- Complement: 100 officers and enlisted
- Armament: 1 × 3"/50 caliber gun; 2 × 40 mm guns; 2 × 20 mm guns; 2 × Depth charge tracks

USS Heed (AM-100) was an Auk-class minesweeper built for the United States Navy during World War II. She earned five battle stars for her World War II service. She was recommissioned during the Korean War. She was placed in reserve in 1954 and remained there until struck from the Naval Vessel Register in 1967.

== Career ==
Heed was launched 19 June 1942 by the General Engineering & Dry Dock Company of Alameda, California; and commissioned 27 February 1943. After shakedown out of San Diego, California, Heed sailed on 24 April for the Aleutians where she took up patrolling station then acted as escort for convoys sailing to and from Alaskan ports. After minesweeping operations out of Dutch Harbor, Alaska, she sailed for Pearl Harbor on 1 December and took up duty there.

On 22 January 1944 she joined Rear Admiral Richard L. Conolly's Northern Attack Force for the Marshall Islands Operations (29 January–23 February 1944). Heed screened the transports until they entered Kwajalein Lagoon on 31 January for the initial landings then began her sweep of the anchorage areas. Screening, mine-sweeping operations and hydrographic work kept Heed busy until 31 March when she sailed for Pearl Harbor.

After escort duties at Pearl Harbor, Heed joined Vice Admiral Turner's Northern Attack Force as a unit of the Minesweeping and Hydrographic Survey Group for capture of Marianas' Saipan and Tinian (June–August 1944). After screening USS Louisville during fire support missions off the southern coast of Saipan, Heed patrolled between Saipan and Tinian and subsequently for the next seven months screened convoys between the Marshalls, the Carolines, and Marianas.

Heed sortied from Ulithi on 19 March 1945 as a unit of Admiral Blandy's Amphibious Support Force for the capture of Okinawa (14 March – 30 June 1945). After sweeping operations off Okinawa, she acted as patrol and escort ship until 28 April when she sailed for the United States via Pearl Harbor, arriving Seattle, Washington, 24 May. With the newest of sweep gear, Heed sailed again for the Western Pacific, arriving Eniwetok 9 October via Johnston Island. She carried out minesweeping operations at Okinawa, Sasebo, Formosa, and the East China Sea.

Heed returned to San Diego, California, 9 February 1946. Heed remained at San Diego, California and decommissioned there on 15 January 1947, joining the Pacific Reserve Fleet. Heed received five battle stars for World War II service.

Heed was recommissioned on 5 March 1952. Departing San Diego, California, 12 May 1952, Heed transited the Panama Canal and arrived Charleston, South Carolina, on 6 June. Between June 1952 and November 1953 Heed operated out of Charleston, South Carolina, and Norfolk, Virginia, making one deployment to the Mediterranean (6 January – 21 May 1953) and a cruise to Quebec, Canada (3–29 August 1953). Departing Charleston 16 November she sailed to Orange, Texas, and decommissioned there on 27 January 1954, and once again joined the Reserve Fleet. Reclassified MSF-100 on 7 February 1955, Heed remained at Orange, Texas, until struck from the Navy List on 1 March 1967.
