= USS Devastator (AM-318) =

Minesweeper of the United States Navy

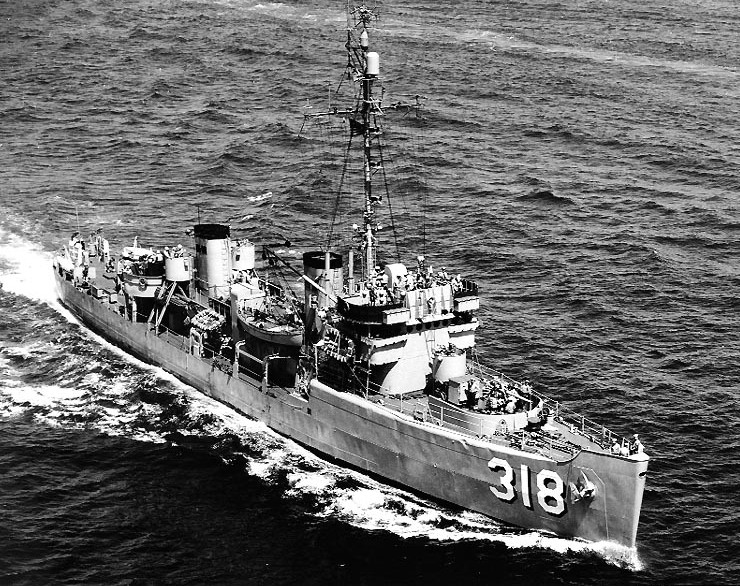
- USS Devastator

History

United States
- Name: as HMS Augusta (BAM-5)
- Builder: General Engineering & Dry Dock Company, Alameda, California
- Laid down: 15 December 1942
- Renamed: USS Devastator (AM-318)
- Launched: 19 April 1943
- Sponsored by: Mrs. D. A. Shaw
- Commissioned: 12 January 1944
- Decommissioned: 15 April 1955
- Recommissioned: 26 February 1952
- Reclassified: MSF-318, 7 February 1955
- Decommissioned: 15 April 1955
- Home port: Long Beach, California
- Honors and awards: three battle stars for World War II service and two for Korean War
- Fate: Sold to Mexico, 1973

History

Mexico
- Name: ARM Sebastián Lerdo de Tejada (C74)
- Namesake: Sebastián Lerdo de Tejada
- Acquired: 1973
- Reclassified: G06
- Reclassified: P105, 1993
- Decommissioned: retired from service by 2004
- Fate: unknown

General characteristics
- Class & type: Auk-class minesweeper
- Displacement: 890 tons
- Length: 221 ft 2 in (67.41 m)
- Beam: 32 ft 2 in (9.80 m)
- Draft: 10 ft 9 in (3.28 m)
- Propulsion: two 2,976 shp (2,219 kW) Baldwin VO8 diesel electric drive engines, Westinghouse single reduction gear, two shafts.
- Speed: 18 knots
- Complement: 105 officers and enlisted
- Armament: one 3 in (76 mm) dual purpose gun mount; two twin 40 mm gun mounts; two single 20 mm gun mounts; two depth charge tracks; five depth charge projectiles

USS Devastator (AM-318) was an Auk-class minesweeper acquired by the U.S. Navy for the dangerous task of removing naval mines from minefields laid in the water to prevent ships from passing.

== Construction history ==
Devastator was launched 19 April 1943 by General Engineering and Dry Dock Co., Alameda, California; sponsored by Mrs. D. A. Shaw; and commissioned 12 January 1944.

== World War II service ==
Devastator – the first ship in the U.S. Navy to bear that name—was an auxiliary ship of the United States Navy. She served as an escort vessel during the latter half of the Second World War, and later saw service in the Korean War.

Devastator arrived at Pearl Harbor 30 March 1944 as escort for a convoy. The next day she began convoy escort duty in Majuro and Kwajalein, which continued until 30 July. During 3 to 17 August she swept off French Frigate Shoals, and after one voyage to Eniwetok from 4 to 25 September, served at Pearl Harbor on training duty for the remainder of the year.

=== Iwo Jima and Okinawa operations ===
Devastator sailed from Pearl Harbor 27 January 1945 as escort for transports bound for the Battle of Iwo Jima. She participated in preinvasion minesweeping for 3 days before the invasion landings of 19 February, then escorted damaged vessels to Saipan, returning to Iwo Jima 1 March to patrol off the island until 7 March.

On 19 March 1945 Devastator got underway from Ulithi for preinvasion minesweeping at Okinawa. She patrolled during and after the invasion and in the heavy suicide attacks of 6 April downed a Japanese plane about 50 yards (46 m) off her port quarter. On 4 July she cleared Okinawa for minesweeping operations in conjunction with the U.S. 3rd Fleet raids on the Japanese mainland. She sailed from Okinawa 15 July for Seattle, Washington arriving 12 August for overhaul.

Devastator remained on the U.S. West Coast for operations except for two extended periods at Pearl Harbor for experiments in hull design development. She was placed out of commission 30 January 1947 into Pacific Reserve Fleet, Long Beach.

== Korean War-related service ==
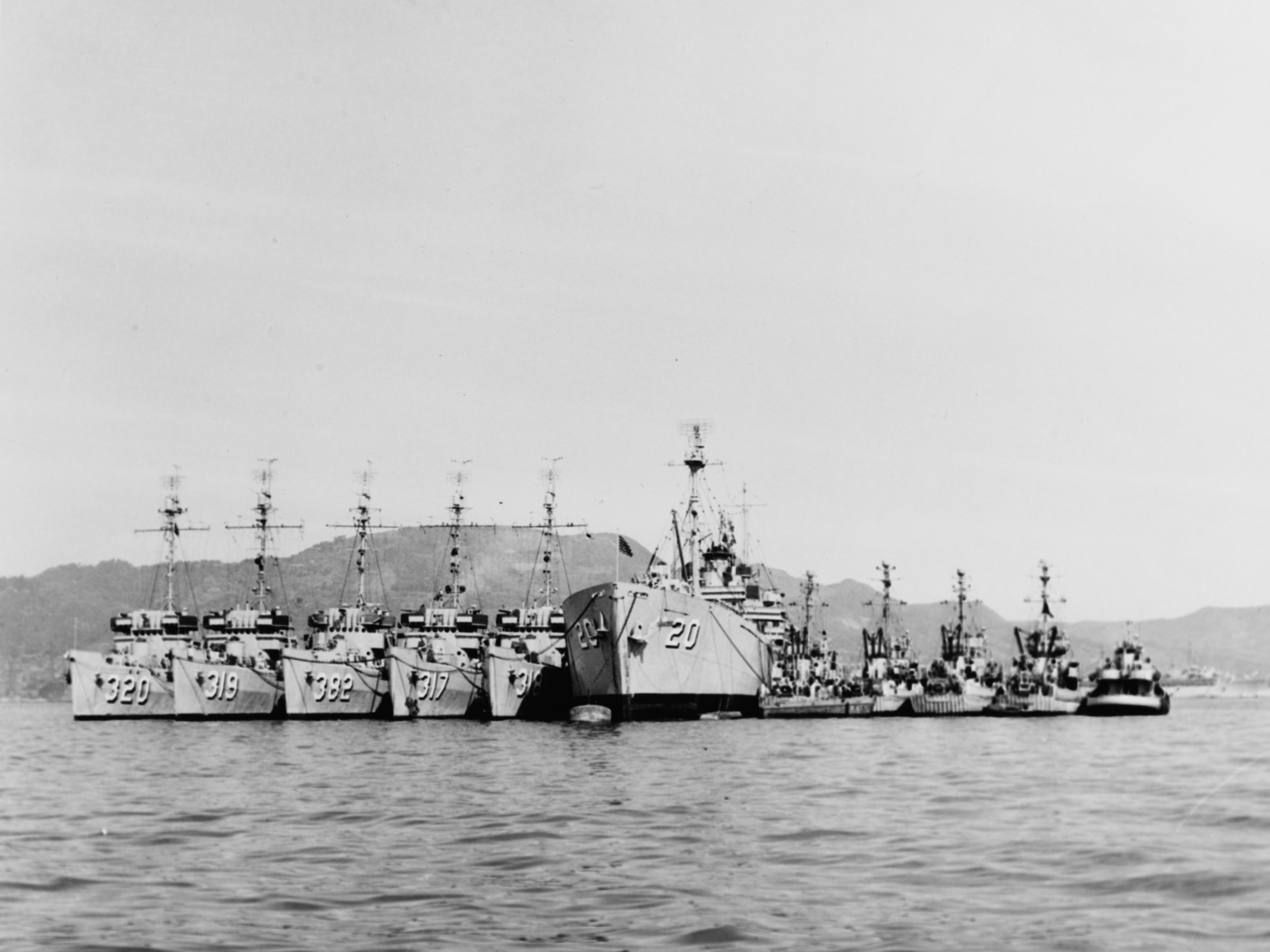
USS Devastator (second ship from left) at Sasebo, Japan, 1952

Recommissioned 26 February 1952 Devastator served in the Far East from 8 July 1952 to 5 February 1953 and again from 5 October 1953 to 2 June 1954 carrying out dangerous sweeps in Korean waters. She then operated on the U.S. west coast until again placed out of commission in reserve 15 April 1955. She was reclassified MSF-318, 7 February 1955.

== Decommissioning and disposal ==
Devastator was decommissioned 15 April 1955. She was sold to Mexico in 1973.

== Awards and honors ==
Devastator received three battle stars for World War II service and two battle stars for Korean War service.

== Mexican Navy service ==
The former Devastator was sold to the Mexican Navy in 1973 and renamed ARM Sebastián Lerdo de Tejada (C74). Her pennant number was later changed to G06, and again changed in 1993 to P105. Sabastian Lerdo de Tejada has been retired from service by 2004.
