= USS Gladiator (AM-319) =

Minesweeper of the United States Navy

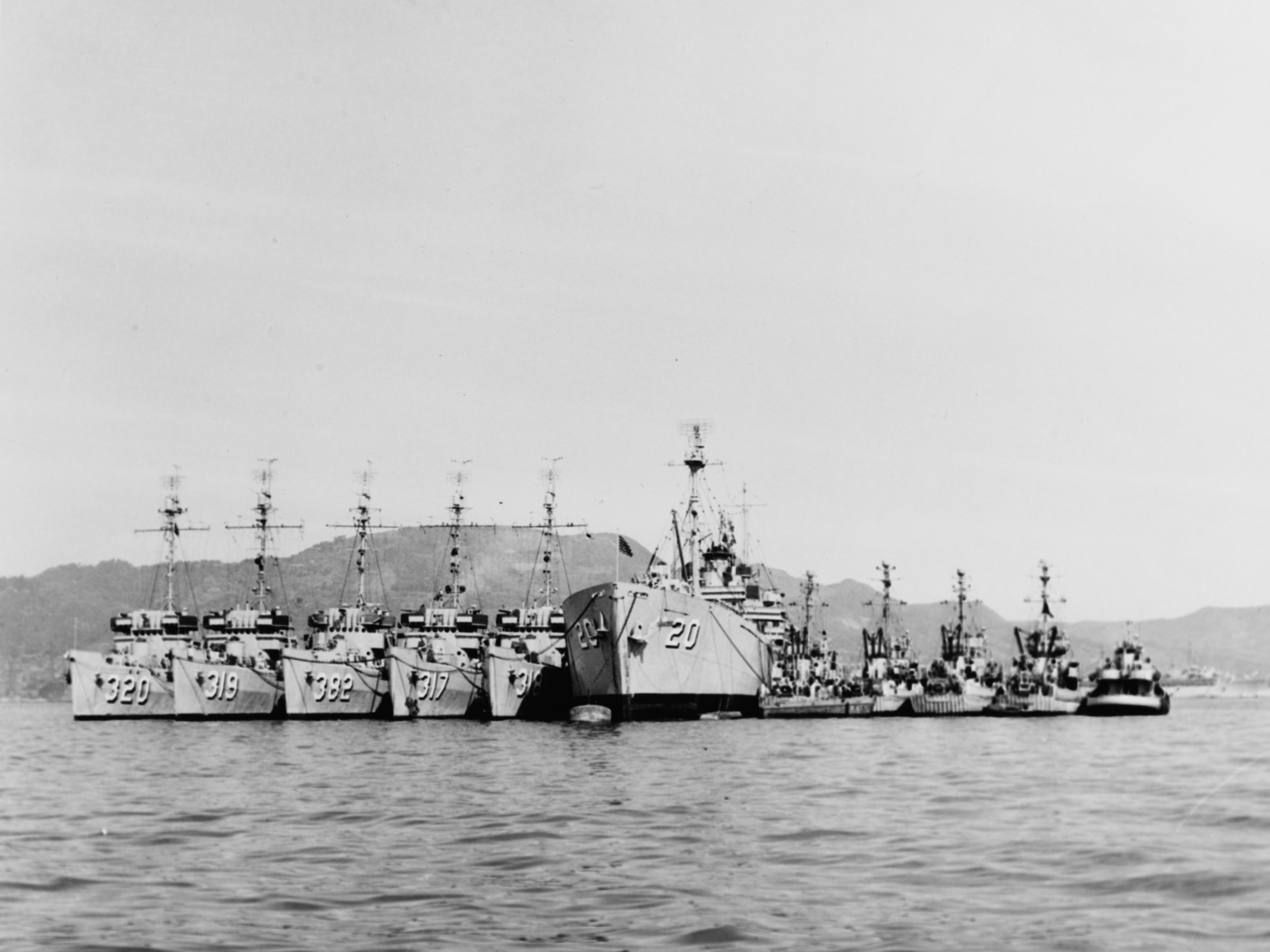
- USS Gladiator (second ship from left) at Sasebo, Japan, 1952.

History

United States
- Name: HMS Blaze (BAM-6)
- Builder: General Engineering & Dry Dock Company, Alameda, California
- Laid down: 7 January 1943
- Launched: 7 May 1943
- Sponsored by: Mrs. Madeline A. Silva
- Completed: 25 February 1944
- Commissioned: 25 February 1944
- Recommissioned: 29 February 1952, Long Beach, California
- Decommissioned: 4 October 1946, San Diego, California; 15 March 1955, Long Beach, California
- Renamed: USS Gladiator (AM-319)
- Reclassified: MSF-319, 7 February 1955
- Stricken: 1 July 1972
- Home port: Long Beach, California
- Honors and awards: two battle stars for World War II service
- Fate: Sold to Mexico, 1973

Mexico
- Name: ARM Santos Degollado (C75)
- Namesake: José Santos Degollado
- Acquired: 1973
- Reclassified: G07; P106, 1993
- Fate: Sunk as dive wreck 3 March 2022

General characteristics
- Class & type: Auk-class minesweeper
- Displacement: 890 tons
- Length: 221 ft 2 in (67.41 m)
- Beam: 32 ft (9.8 m)
- Draft: 10 ft (3.0 m)
- Propulsion: two 2,976shp Baldwin V08 diesel electric drive engines, Westinghouse single reduction gear, two shafts
- Speed: 18 knots
- Complement: 105 officers and enlisted
- Armament: one 3 in (76 mm) dual purpose gun; two twin 40 mm gun mounts; two single Oerlikon 20 mm cannon mounts; two depth charge tracks; five depth charge projectiles

USS Gladiator (AM-319) was an Auk-class minesweeper acquired by the U.S. Navy for the dangerous task of removing mines from minefields laid in the water to prevent ships from passing.

== Construction history ==
Gladiator was originally built as BAM-6, and was launched 7 May 1943 as AM-319 by the General Engineering & Drydock Co., Alameda, California; sponsored by Mrs. Madeline A. Silva; and acquired and simultaneously commissioned 25 February 1944.

== World War II service ==
Gladiator sailed from San Francisco, California, 1 May 1944 with a convoy for Pearl Harbor and subsequently made four round trip escort voyages from Hawaii—one to Kwajalein and three to Eniwetok—from 22 May-11 September 1944. Underway again 16 October, she reached Ulithi 12 November and commenced patrol and escort duty in those waters. Voyages to Eniwetok, Kossol Roads, and Saipan, were frequently made to shepherd merchantmen to and from those strategic ports until Gladiator sailed from Ulithi 19 March 1945 for combat at Okinawa.

Closing the beaches of Okinawa 24 March when Vice Admiral Willis A. Lee’ s battleships were bombarding the island, Gladiator began minesweeping operations and screening duties.

=== Under attack by Japanese aircraft ===
On 6 April she came under attack from a Japanese bomber and shot it down with the help of four American fighters that were on the bomber's tail during its approach. Another plane was splashed 6 days later when Gladiator's automatic weapons brought it down close aboard on the starboard beam; debris rained about the ship. A third enemy plane was shot down 22 April, crashing into the sea after passing just fifty feet above the ship's deck; but one man was killed and five wounded by the plane's strafing.

Gladiator continued minesweeping duties off Okinawa until sailing 19 May with a convoy for Saipan and Guam, subsequently returning to Okinawa 21 June. From 8–25 July 1945 she conducted minesweeping operations in the East China Sea, destroying six mines, and put in at Guam 11 August for major overhaul.

=== End-of-war operations ===
Gladiator departed Guam 24 November and reached San Francisco, California, 15 December 1945. She steamed to San Pedro, Los Angeles, 30 May 1946, and, after being towed to San Diego, California, 2 October 1946 she was decommissioned at that port 2 days later into Pacific Reserve Fleet, Long Beach.

== Korean War service ==
Recommissioned 29 February 1952 at Long Beach, California, Gladiator sailed 2 September for Japan, closing Sasebo 1 month later, and steaming to Wonsan, Korea, 27 October. She swept mines in those dangerous waters until returning to Sasebo 10 November and subsequently, until the spring of 1953, divided her time between mine-sweeping operations at Wonsan, Inchon, and Hungnam and replenishment and training exercises in Sasebo and Yokosuka, Japan.

== Post-Korean War activity ==
Gladiator departed Sasebo, Japan, 19 March 1953 and put in at Long Beach, California, 10 April. She engaged in peacetime activities: overhaul at San Francisco, training exercises off southern California, a round trip cruise from Long Beach to Acapulco, Mexico, and Balboa, Panama (15 January-12 February 1954), and a cruise to Bellingham, Washington, and return (28 June-10 July 1954).

== Decommissioning and disposal ==
Gladiator was decommissioned at Long Beach, California, on 15 March 1955. Redesignated MSF-319, Gladiator entered the reserve fleet berthed at Green Cove Springs, Florida. She was later transferred to the Pacific Reserve Fleet at San Diego, California. She remained in "mothballs" until 1973, when she was sold to Mexico and renamed Santos Degollado.

== Battle honors ==
Gladiator received two battle stars for World War II service.

== Mexican Navy service ==
The former Gladiator was sold in 1973 to the Mexican Navy, which renamed her ARM Santos Degollado (C75). Her pennant number was later changed to G07, before it was changed a final time to P106 in 1993. As of 2007, Santos Degollado was in active service with the Mexican Navy. As of February 3, 2022, P106 was donated by the Mexican Navy to the State of Sonora to be sunk in the Port of Guaymas and create an artificial reef and bring tourists for diving adventures. The Secretary of Tourism of the State of Sonora Celida Lopez alongside Mexican Navy Admiral Raul Perez Vazquez of the Fourth Naval Zone visited P106 and discussed final preparations before being scuttled on 3/2/2022. P106 was scuttled as a dive wreck and artificial reef on 3/3/2022 near San Carlos, Sonora, Mexico.
