= Adroit =

Adroit may refer to:

- Adroit class minesweeper, a U.S. Navy minesweeper class
- Adroitness, a personality trait related to agreeableness
- HMAS Adroit (P 82), an Attack-class patrol boat
- L'Adroit class destroyer, a group of fourteen French navy destroyers
- USS Adroit (AM-82), an Adroit-class minesweeper
- USS Adroit (MSO-509), an Acme-class minesweeper
- USS Adroit (SP-248), a steam yacht
