= List of ship commissionings in 1942 =

The list of ship commissionings in 1942 includes a chronological list of ships commissioned in 1942. In cases where no official commissioning ceremony was held, the date of service entry may be used instead.

Date	Operator	Ship	Class and type	Notes
March 2	Royal Navy	Avenger (D14)	Avenger-class escort carrier	ex-Rio Hudson
March 2	Royal Navy	Biter (D97)	Avenger-class escort carrier	ex-Rio Parana
March 3	United States Navy	Charger (AVG-30)	Charger-class escort carrier	ex-Rio de la Plata
March 4	United States Navy	Aaron Ward (DD-483)	Gleaves-class destroyer	under command of Commander Orville F. Gregor
March 20	United States Navy	South Dakota (BB-57)	South Dakota-class battleship	
March	Royal Navy	Maria	Wreck dispersal vessel	ex-German weather ship WBS 8 August Wriedt
April 30	United States Navy	Indiana (BB-58)	South Dakota-class battleship	
May 1	Luftwaffe	Bussard	Bussard-class seaplane tender	Completion date
May 12	United States Navy	Marcasite (PY-28)	Patrol yacht	ex-Ramfis
May 12	United States Navy	Massachusetts (BB-59)	South Dakota-class battleship	
June 3	Royal Navy	Invicta	Landing Ship, Infantry	ex-SS Invicta for Southern Railway, requisitioned on completion
June 15	United States Navy	Copahee (CVE-12)	Bogue-class escort carrier	ex-Steel Architect
June 22	Royal Navy	Anson (79)	King George V-class battleship	
July 1	Royal Navy	Dasher (D37)	Avenger-class escort carrier	ex-Rio de Janeiro
August 9	Kriegsmarine	Schnelles Geleitboot 1	Sans Souci-class sloop	SG 1
August 16	United States Navy	Alabama (BB-60)	South Dakota-class battleship	
August 20	United States Navy	Nassau (CVE-16)	Bogue-class escort carrier	
August 21	United States Navy	Chenango (ACV-28)	Sangamon-class escort carrier	recommissioned after conversion
August 25	United States Navy	Sangamon (ACV-26)	Sangamon-class escort carrier	recommissioned after conversion
August 29	Royal Navy	Howe (32)	King George V-class battleship	
August 31	United States Navy	Direct (AM-90)	Adroit-class minesweeper	
September 7	Kriegsmarine	Schnelles Geleitboot 2	Sans Souci-class sloop	SG 2
September 15	United States Navy	Altamaha (CVE-18)	Bogue-class escort carrier	
September 19	United States Navy	Chenango (ACV-28)	Sangamon-class escort carrier	recommissioned after conversion
September 24	United States Navy	Suwannee (ACV-27)	Sangamon-class escort carrier	recommissioned after conversion
September 26	United States Navy	Bogue (CVE-9)	Bogue-class escort carrier	ex-Steel Advocate
September 30	Royal Navy	Attacker (D02)	Attacker-class escort carrier	ex-USS Barnes, acquired through Lend-Lease
November 2	Kriegsmarine	Schnelles Geleitboot 3	Sans Souci-class sloop	SG 3
November 8	United States Navy	Card (CVE-11)	Bogue-class escort carrier	
November 15	Royal Navy	Battler (D18)	Attacker-class escort carrier	ex-USS Altamaha, acquired through Lend-Lease
November 22	Luftwaffe	Falke	Bussard-class seaplane tender	completion date
12 December	United States Navy	Apache (ATF-67)	Cherokee-class tugboat	
December 21	Royal Navy	Stalker (D91)	Attacker-class escort carrier	ex-USS Hamlin, acquired through Lend-Lease
December 10	United States Navy	Core (CVE-13)	Bogue-class escort carrier	
December 31	United States Navy	Essex (CV-9)	Essex-class aircraft carrier	
December	Luftwaffe	Boelcke	Karl Meyer-class seaplane tender	completion date
unknown date	Kriegsmarine	Kehdingen	Weather ship	WBS 6
