= USS Conflict =

Two ships of the United States Navy have been named USS Conflict:

- USS Conflict (AM-85) was launched on 18 April 1942 by the Commercial Iron Works, Portland, Oregon.
- USS Conflict (AM-426) was launched on 16 December 1952 by the Fulton Shipyard, Antioch, California.
