= USS Engage =

USS Engage is the name of two ships of the United States Navy.

- USS Engage (AM-93), an Adroit-class minesweeper, which dropped its name and was simply known by the designation PC-1597
- USS Engage (MSO-433), an Aggressive-class minesweeper that served from 1954 until 1992.
