= P110 =

P110 may refer to:

- ARM Valentin Gómez Farías (P110), a patrol boat of the Mexican Navy
- Papyrus 110, a biblical manuscript
- p110α through p110δ, class I catalytic phosphoinositide 3-kinases
- P110, a state regional road in Latvia
