= USS Daring =

Minesweeper of the United States Navy

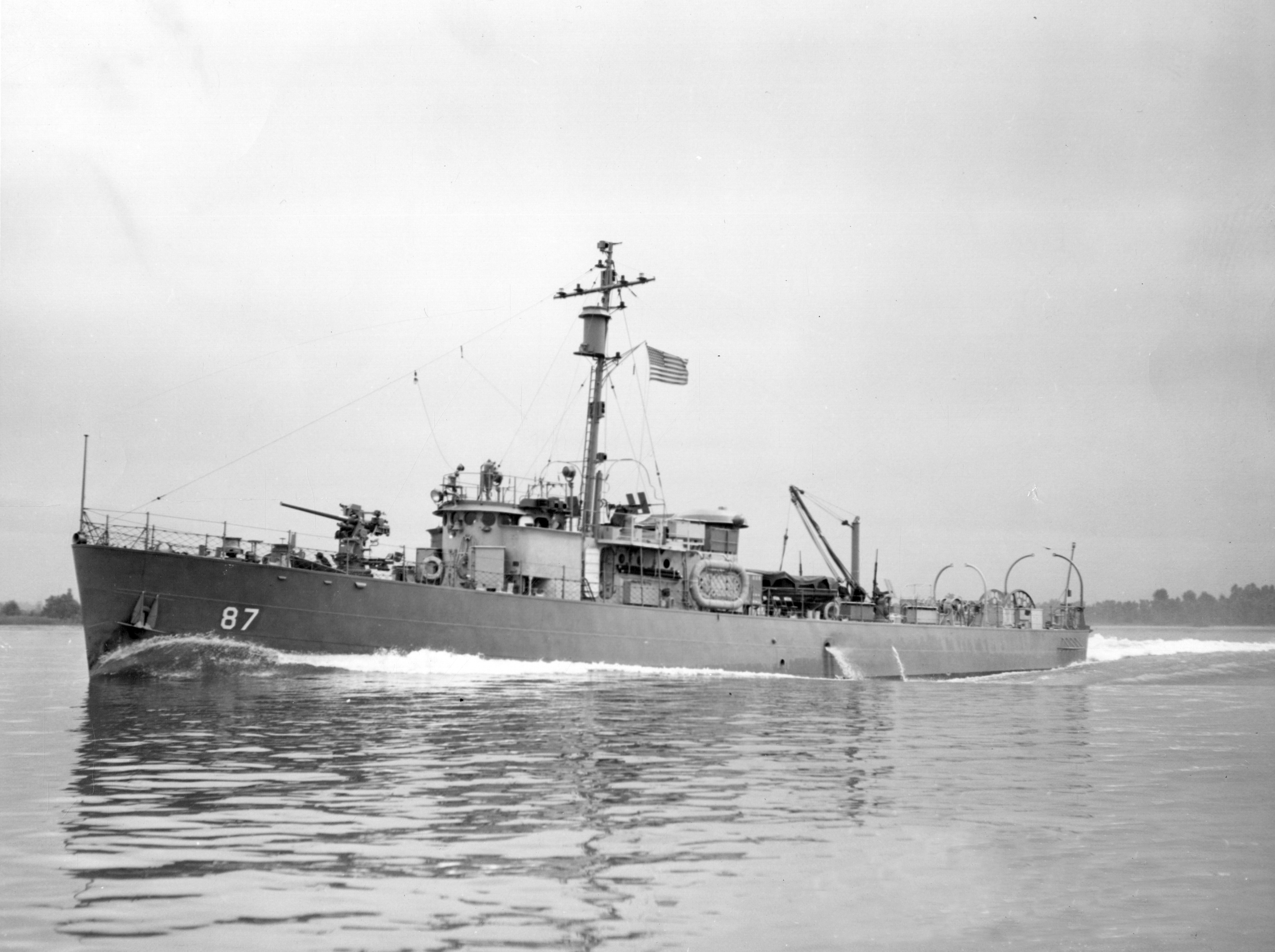
- Daring on 6 October 1942

History

United States
- Name: Daring
- Builder: Commercial Iron Works, Portland, Oregon
- Laid down: 12 March 1942
- Launched: 23 May 1942
- Commissioned: 10 October 1942
- Renamed: USS PC-1591, 1 June 1944
- Decommissioned: 22 January 1946
- Honours and awards: 1 battle star (World War II)
- Fate: Transferred to the Maritime Commission, 18 March 1948

General characteristics
- Class & type: Adroit-class minesweeper
- Displacement: 275 long tons (279 t)
- Length: 173 ft 8 in (52.93 m)
- Beam: 23 ft (7.0 m)
- Draft: 11 ft 7 in (3.53 m)
- Propulsion: 2 × 1,770 bhp (1,320 kW) Cooper Bessemer GNB8 diesel engines; Farrel-Birmingham single reduction gear; 2 shafts
- Speed: 17 knots (31 km/h)
- Complement: 65
- Armament: 1 × 3"/50 caliber gun; 1 × 40 mm gun

USS Daring (AM-87) was an Adroit-class minesweeper of the United States Navy.

Laid down on 12 March 1942 by the Commercial Iron Works of Portland, Oregon, the ship was launched on 23 May 1942, and commissioned on 10 October 1942. Daring was reclassified as a PC-461-class submarine chaser, PC-1591, on 1 June 1944.

== World War II Pacific Theatre Operations ==
Sailing from San Francisco, California, 2 February 1943, Daring arrived at Pearl Harbor 12 February for service as local escort and school ship, and sweeping mines until 5 March when she was underway for Nouméa. From 24 March 1943 until 25 November 1944 Daring remained in the southwest Pacific on inter-island escort duty and anti-submarine patrol, taking part in the invasion of the Treasury Islands on 6 November 1943. She was reclassified as the submarine chaser PC-1591 and her name cancelled 1 June 1944.

== As a submarine chaser ==
Arriving at Ulithi on 9 December 1944, PC-1591 escorted convoys to Guam, Saipan, Leyte, and the Palaus until 7 March 1945. She screened USS Pathfinder on a survey of Casiguran Bay, Luzon between 10 March and 5 April, then put into Saipan on 14 April. From 13 May to 24 August she escorted convoys between Saipan and Iwo Jima, and on 13 October cleared Saipan for the west coast, arriving at San Francisco, California, 13 November.

== Post-war deactivation ==
She was decommissioned at Mare Island, California on 22 January 1946 and transferred to the United States Maritime Commission for disposal 18 March 1948.

== Awards ==
PC-1591 received one battle star for World War II service.
