= USS Annoy =

Minesweeper of the United States Navy

History

United States
- Name: USS Annoy
- Builder: Commercial Iron Works, Portland, Oregon
- Laid down: 3 December 1941
- Launched: 6 April 1942
- Commissioned: 2 September 1942
- Renamed: USS PC-1588, 1 June 1944
- Decommissioned: 8 February 1946
- Stricken: 12 March 1946
- Honors and awards: 1 battle star (World War II)
- Fate: Transferred to the Maritime Commission, 6 May 1948

General characteristics
- Class & type: Adroit-class minesweeper
- Displacement: 330 long tons (335 t)
- Length: 173 ft 8 in (52.93 m)
- Beam: 23 ft (7.0 m)
- Draft: 6 ft 6 in (1.98 m)
- Propulsion: 2 × 1,770 bhp (1,320 kW) Cooper Bessemer GNB8 diesel engines, 2 shafts
- Speed: 16.8 knots (31.1 km/h)
- Complement: 65
- Armament: 1 × 3 in (76 mm)/50 cal; 1 × 40 mm gun; 5 × 20 mm cannons; 2 × rocket launchers; 2 × depth charge throwers; 2 × depth charge tracks

USS Annoy (AM-84) was an Adroit-class minesweeper of the United States Navy. She was laid down on 3 December 1941 at Portland, Oregon, by the Commercial Iron Works; launched on 6 April 1942; and commissioned on 2 September 1942. In 1944 she was reclassified as a patrol craft and renamed PC-1588.

== World War II Pacific Theatre operations ==
The newly commissioned minesweeper's first assignment took her to the Aleutian Islands to carry out antisubmarine warfare (ASW) patrols and escort assignments protecting various vessels as they moved between Unalaska, Adak, and Atka Islands. On 16 September 1943, USS Annoy departed Dutch Harbor to escort USS Oriole and her tow, Abner Read, to Seattle, Washington, where the convoy arrived on 5 October. The next day, Annoy entered the Puget Sound Navy Yard, Bremerton, Washington, for upkeep.

The vessel left the yard on 9 November, bound for San Pedro, California. Upon her arrival there, Annoy began a month of mine-sweeping and ASW exercises. On 11 December, she began escort duty out of San Francisco, California, to various points in the Pacific. Among her destinations were Pearl Harbor, Hawaii; Majuro Atoll, Marshall Islands; Funafuti, Ellice Islands; and Tarawa, Gilbert Islands.

== Pearl Harbor upkeep ==
USS Annoy entered the Pearl Harbor Navy Yard on 16 April 1944 for upkeep. Upon the conclusion of the work, she commenced operations with Submarine Squadron 4 based at Pearl Harbor. The ship served as a screening and escort vessel and acted as a target ship for submarines during their training routines.

== Conversion to patrol craft ==
The name Annoy was cancelled on 1 June and the ship's classification was changed to PC-1588. She was relieved of her training duties on 23 July and got underway for San Francisco. She entered a shipyard at Alameda, California, on 3 August, for availability. The ship emerged on 18 November and, the next day, began the return voyage to Hawaii.

== Return to the Pacific Theatre ==
PC-1588 reached Pearl Harbor on 28 November and was assigned patrol and ASW screening duties for various transport groups training in Hawaiian waters. On 24 January 1945, she sortied from Pearl Harbor in the screen of Task Group 51.5, bound, via Eniwetok and Guam, for the Volcano Islands. PC-1588 arrived off Iwo Jima on 20 February. During the next three months, the vessel acted as a control ship for various beaches on Iwo Jima, served as an air-sea rescue ship, operated in ASW screens, and took enemy aircraft under fire on three separate occasions.

The ship left Iwo Jima on 28 May to escort a convoy to Saipan. She returned to Iwo Jima on 16 June and resumed her ASW and air-sea rescue duties which she carried out through the end of the war. PC-1588 escorted two more convoys between Saipan and Iwo Jima—one in September and one in mid-October. On the latter trip, she continued on from Saipan and proceeded via Eniwetok and Pearl Harbor to San Francisco. The ship reached San Francisco Bay on 13 November and immediately began preparations for inactivation.

== End-of-War deactivation ==
On 29 January 1946, PC-1588 left San Francisco in tow en route to Richmond, California. She arrived there on 3 February and was decommissioned on 8 February 1946. Her number was struck from the Navy List on 12 March 1946, and she was transferred to the Maritime Commission for disposal on 6 May 1948.

== Awards ==
PC-1588 received one battle star for her World War II service.
