= USS Auk (AM-57) =

Minesweeper of the United States Navy

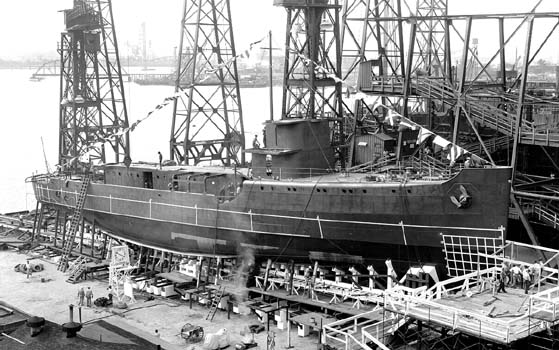

History

United States
- Name: USS Auk
- Builder: Norfolk Navy Yard, Portsmouth, Virginia
- Laid down: 15 April 1941
- Launched: 26 August 1941
- Commissioned: 15 January 1942
- Decommissioned: 1 July 1946
- Reclassified: MSF-57, 7 February 1955
- Stricken: 1 August 1956
- Honours and awards: 3 battle stars (World War II)

General characteristics
- Class & type: Auk-class minesweeper
- Displacement: 890 long tons (904 t)
- Length: 221 ft 3 in (67.44 m)
- Beam: 32 ft (9.8 m)
- Draft: 10 ft 9 in (3.28 m)
- Speed: 18 knots (33 km/h; 21 mph)
- Complement: 100 officers and enlisted
- Armament: 1 × 3"/50 caliber gun; 2 × 40 mm guns; 8 × 20 mm guns

USS Auk (AM-57) was an Auk-class minesweeper acquired by the United States Navy for the dangerous task of removing mines from minefields laid in the water to prevent ships from passing.

Auk was named after the auk, a diving bird native to the colder climates of the northern hemisphere.

The second warship of the U.S. Navy to be named Auk, the ship was laid down on 15 April 1941 at Portsmouth, Virginia, by the Norfolk Navy Yard; launched on 26 August; sponsored by Miss Priscilla Alden Hague, the daughter of Commander Wesley M. Hague; and commissioned on 15 January 1942.

== Participation in Operation Torch ==
After shakedown and training off the Virginia Capes, the new minesweeper operated along the Atlantic coast until October when she received orders to join the Western Naval Task Force for Operation Torch, the invasion of North Africa. She sortied from Norfolk, Virginia, on the 23rd of that month as a part of the Center Attack Group, bound for Fedhala Roads just off the Moroccan coast. Shortly before midnight on 7 November the task force arrived in position and began disembarking troops for the landing at dawn on the 8th. Just a few minutes after 0500, a little French steamer escorted by the trawler Victoria blundered into the columns of transports offshore.

Hogan (DMS-6) investigated the intruders, crossing the French trawler's bow and ordering him to reverse engines. For an answer, the scrappy little Frenchman tried to ram Hogan. The high speed minesweeper swept Victoria with 20-millimeter gunfire and stopped the trawler dead. Auk placed a prize crew on board, then continued screening the transport area.

At 1200, Miantonomah (CMc-5) began laying a minefield to the east as a protection for the Center Attack Group. While screening the minelayer, Auk and Tillman (DD-641) engaged the Vichy French patrol vessel W-43 which was escorting six merchant and fishing vessels through the transport area. They captured the corvette with a minimal amount of trouble and also took three of the other ships.

Auk worked out of Casablanca, French Morocco, operating as a convoy escort, a screening ship, and a harbor patrol boat until 11 April 1943, when she headed west with a homeward-bound convoy. Following her arrival at Charleston, South Carolina, on the 30th, the minesweeper proceeded to Norfolk, Virginia, for drydocking and overhaul. From June to April 1944, Auk escorted convoys from Norfolk and New York to ports in the Caribbean and along the U.S. Gulf coast.

== Participation in Operation "Overlord" ==
On 19 April, the minesweeper again headed eastward to prepare for Operation Overlord, the invasion of Europe. Proceeding via the Azores and Milford Haven, Wales, she reached Plymouth, England, on the 29th. While in British waters, Auk joined other units of Mine Squadron (MinRon) 21 in practice sweeping operations.

Early on 4 June, she got underway to sweep mines in the Baie de la Seine, France, to prepare the way for the assault on Utah Beach, Normandy, scheduled for the 5th. Weather forced the postponement of the landings until the following day, but one of Auk's sister ships, Osprey (AM-56), hit a mine and sank. The invasion began on 6 June, and Auk remained off the beaches until the 19th, sweeping nearby waters. She then returned to Plymouth, England, for supplies.

On 25 June, Auk returned to sweeping duties off Cherbourg, France, where she cleared a lane ahead of a major bombardment force including battleships Arkansas (BB-33), Texas (BB-35), and Nevada (BB-36). Shortly after midday, enemy shore batteries opened fire on the sweepers. By 1230, every minesweeper – including Auk – had been straddled by enemy salvos. Hampered by their five-knot top speed when streaming sweep gear, the minesweepers were ordered to retire out of range until the task force concluded its gunfire.

Between 29 June and 24 July, with the exception of brief runs to England for supplies, Auk continued sweeping operations in the Baie de la Seine. The sweeper sailed with MinRon 21 for Gibraltar on 1 August, transited the strait on the 5th, and briefly stopped at Oran, Algeria, on the 6th. From there, Auk proceeded to Naples, Italy, one of the staging points for the invasion of southern France.

== Participation in Operation "Dragoon" ==
When Operation Dragoon commenced on 15 August, Auk was off the designated beaches of Provence with Vice Admiral Hewitt's Control Force. She remained along the coast of southern France until 26 September, intermittently coming under fire by enemy coastal batteries while sweeping Baie de Cavalaire, Baie de Briande, Baie de Bon Porte, Marseille harbor, and waters off Toulon. Therefore, Auk continued minesweeping and patrol missions in the Mediterranean until 31 May 1945, when she headed for the United States.

== Post-World War II operations ==
Arriving in Norfolk, Virginia, on 15 June, she received an overhaul. The minesweeper remained in the Norfolk Navy Yard until 25 August. After leaving the yard, she conducted local training operations before sailing on 18 September. Proceeding through the Panama Canal, she reached San Pedro, California, on 9 October. However, instead of reporting for Pacific Fleet duty, Auk received orders for inactivation. She departed California on 26 November and headed for Portland, Oregon, where she was scheduled to undergo inactivation overhaul. Upon her arrival at that port, on 10 December, Auk found severely crowded conditions which resulted in new orders which sent the minesweeper back to San Diego, California where she moored on the last day of 1945.

Auk was decommissioned on 1 July 1946 and berthed with the reserve fleet at San Diego, California. In a general reclassification dated 7 February 1955, her hull designation was changed to MSF-57. Her name was struck from the Navy list on 1 August 1956.

== Awards ==
Auk earned three battle stars for her World War II activities.
