= USS Dynamic (AM-91) =

Minesweeper of the United States Navy

History

United States
- Name: USS Dynamic
- Builder: Dravo Corporation, Neville Island, Pittsburgh, Pennsylvania
- Laid down: 16 January 1942
- Launched: 26 May 1942
- Commissioned: 15 September 1942
- Decommissioned: 19 November 1945
- Renamed: USS PC-1595, 1 June 1944
- Honors and awards: 1 battle star (World War II)
- Fate: Transferred to the Maritime Commission, 21 October 1946

General characteristics
- Class & type: Adroit-class minesweeper
- Displacement: 295 long tons (300 t)
- Length: 173 ft 8 in (52.93 m)
- Beam: 23 ft (7.0 m)
- Draft: 11 ft 7 in (3.53 m)
- Propulsion: 2 × 1,770 bhp (1,320 kW) Cooper Bessemer GNB-8 diesel engines; 2 shafts
- Speed: 17 knots (31 km/h)
- Complement: 66
- Armament: 1 × 3"/50 caliber gun; 1 × 40 mm gun

USS Dynamic (AM-91) was an Adroit-class minesweeper of the United States Navy. It was laid down on 16 January 1942 by the Dravo Corporation, Neville Island, Pittsburgh, Pennsylvania, launched on 26 May 1942, and commissioned on 15 September 1942. The ship was reclassified as a submarine chaser PC-1595 on 1 June 1944.

== World War II North Atlantic Operations ==
Dynamic arrived at Norfolk, Virginia, on 22 November and was assigned to Local Defense Force, Bermuda. She joined the Royal Navy's HMS Evadne in patrolling off Bermuda and escorted convoys to Norfolk and Key West, Florida. On 1 June 1944 her name was canceled and her classification changed to PC-1595.

== As submarine chaser ==
PC-1595 sailed from Norfolk on 4 July 1944 for duty in the Mediterranean. Arriving at Bizerte, Tunisia, on 23 July, she got underway three days later to escort LST-995 to Naples. She screened an assault convoy to Ajaccio, Corsica, from which the group sortied on 14 August for the invasion of southern France. She covered the landings at Baie de Briande on 18 August, then sailed on the 22nd to escort convoys between Naples and Palermo. She arrived at Baie de Bon Porte on 4 September for escort duty along the coast of France and Italy.

PC-1595 arrived at Oran, Algeria, on 21 May 1945, and six days later sailed with 11 other PC's for Charleston, South Carolina, arriving 13 June after calling at the Azores and Bermuda.

== Post-war decommissioning ==
Two days later she reported to Jacksonville, Florida, where she was decommissioned on 19 November 1945 and transferred to the Maritime Commission on 21 October 1946 for disposal.

PC-1595 received one battle star for World War II service.
