= P103 =

P103 may refer to:

- ARM Mariano Escobedo (P103), a patrol boat of the Mexican Navy
- Dominican ship Cibao (P103), a patrol boat of the Dominican Navy
- Papyrus 103, a biblical manuscript
- P103, a state regional road in Latvia
