= USS Advent =

Minesweeper of the United States Navy

History

United States
- Name: USS Advent
- Builder: Commercial Iron Works, Portland, Oregon
- Laid down: 18 August 1941
- Launched: 12 March 1942
- Commissioned: 19 August 1942
- Renamed: USS PC-1587, 1 June 1944
- Decommissioned: 22 January 1946
- Stricken: 25 February 1946
- Fate: Transferred to the Maritime Commission for disposal, 18 March 1948

General characteristics
- Class & type: Adroit-class minesweeper
- Displacement: 295 long tons (300 t)
- Length: 173 ft 8 in (52.93 m)
- Beam: 23 ft (7.0 m)
- Draft: 6 ft 6 in (1.98 m)
- Propulsion: 2 × 1,770 bhp (1,320 kW) Cooper Bessemer GNB8 diesel engines; Farrel-Birmingham single reduction gear; 2 shafts
- Speed: 16 knots (30 km/h)
- Complement: 65
- Armament: 1 × 3"/50 caliber gun; 1 × 40 mm gun

USS Advent (AM-83) was an Adroit-class minesweeper of the United States Navy. The ship was laid down on 18 August 1941 at Portland, Oregon, by the Commercial Iron Works; launched on 12 March 1942; and commissioned on 19 August 1942.

== World War II Pacific theatre operations ==
Advent served on escort and patrol duty in the South and West Pacific throughout World War II. From 2 May until 8 October 1943, she operated out of Noumea, New Caledonia, on convoy screening duty. Her ports of call included Espiritu Santo; Sydney, Australia; Tongatapu; Efate, New Hebrides; and Guadalcanal.

The ship changed her base of operations to Guadalcanal in mid-October 1943. She made numerous runs to Espiritu Santo; the Treasury Islands; Noumea; Efate; Bougainville, Solomon Islands; Sydney; and Ulithi. On 1 June 1944, the name Advent was dropped, and the ship was designated as submarine chaser USS PC-1587.

Between late August and mid-October 1944, PC-1587 was based at Espiritu Santo. The highlight of her service during this period was her rescue on 11 October of the crew of a downed PBY aircraft. During November, the patrol craft operated from Guadalcanal; and, on 4 December, she shifted to Ulithi. By April 1945, PC-1587 had completed five convoy runs to Kossol Roads, Palau Islands, and one to Guam.

== Return to Stateside ==
In April, PC-1587 assumed patrol duty at Saipan. The ship also escorted convoys to Iwo Jima, the Bonin Islands, Guam, and Tinian. On 17 October, she set a course for the California coast, sailing via Eniwetok and Pearl Harbor. She dropped anchor in San Francisco Bay on 13 November 1945.

== Post-war deactivation ==
Preparations for her deactivation were begun soon after reaching the west coast, and PC-1587 was decommissioned on 22 January 1946. Her name was struck from the Navy list on 25 February 1946, and she was transferred to the Maritime Commission on 18 March 1948 for disposal.
