= Despite =

Despite may refer to:

- A common preposition
- Despite (band), A Swedish metal band
- USS Despite (AM-89), an Adroit-class minesweeper of the United States Navy
