= USS Starling =

Minesweeper of the United States Navy

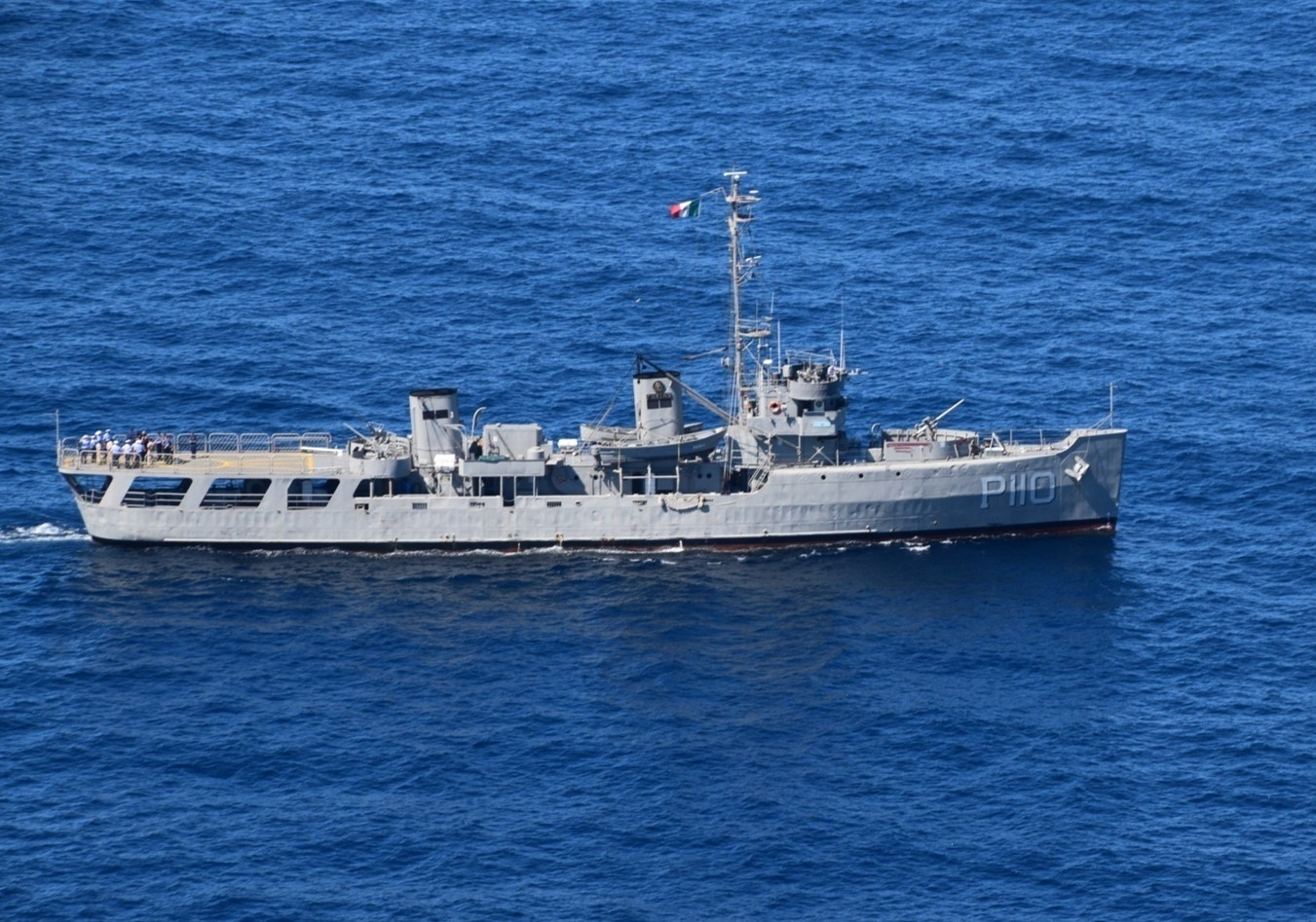
- ARM Valentín Gómez Farías (P110) underway in 2015.

History

United States
- Name: USS Starling (AM-64)
- Builder: General Engineering & Dry Dock Company, Alameda, California
- Laid down: 1 July 1941
- Launched: 11 April 1942
- Commissioned: 21 December 1942
- Decommissioned: 15 May 1946
- Reclassified: MSF-64, 7 February 1955
- Stricken: 1 July 1972
- Honours and awards: 3 battle stars (World War II)
- Fate: Sold to Mexico, 16 February 1973

Mexico
- Name: ARM Valentín Gómez Farías (C79)
- Namesake: Valentín Gómez Farías
- Acquired: 16 February 1973
- Reclassified: G11; P110, 1993
- Status: in active service, as of February 2026

General characteristics
- Class & type: Auk-class minesweeper
- Displacement: 890 long tons (904 t)
- Length: 221 ft 3 in (67.44 m)
- Beam: 32 ft (9.8 m)
- Draft: 10 ft 9 in (3.28 m)
- Speed: 18 knots (33 km/h; 21 mph)
- Complement: 100 officers and enlisted
- Armament: 1 × 3"/50 caliber gun; 2 × 40 mm guns; 2 × 20 mm guns; 2 × Depth charge tracks

USS Starling (AM-64) was an Auk-class minesweeper acquired by the United States Navy for the dangerous task of removing mines from minefields laid in the water to prevent ships from passing.

Starling was named after the starling, which is any passerine bird of the genus Sturnus or of the family, Sturnidae.

The second Starling to be so named by the Navy, AM-64 was laid down on 1 July 1941 by the General Engineering and Drydock Co., Alameda, California; launched on 11 April 1942; and commissioned on 21 December 1942.

== World War II Pacific operations ==
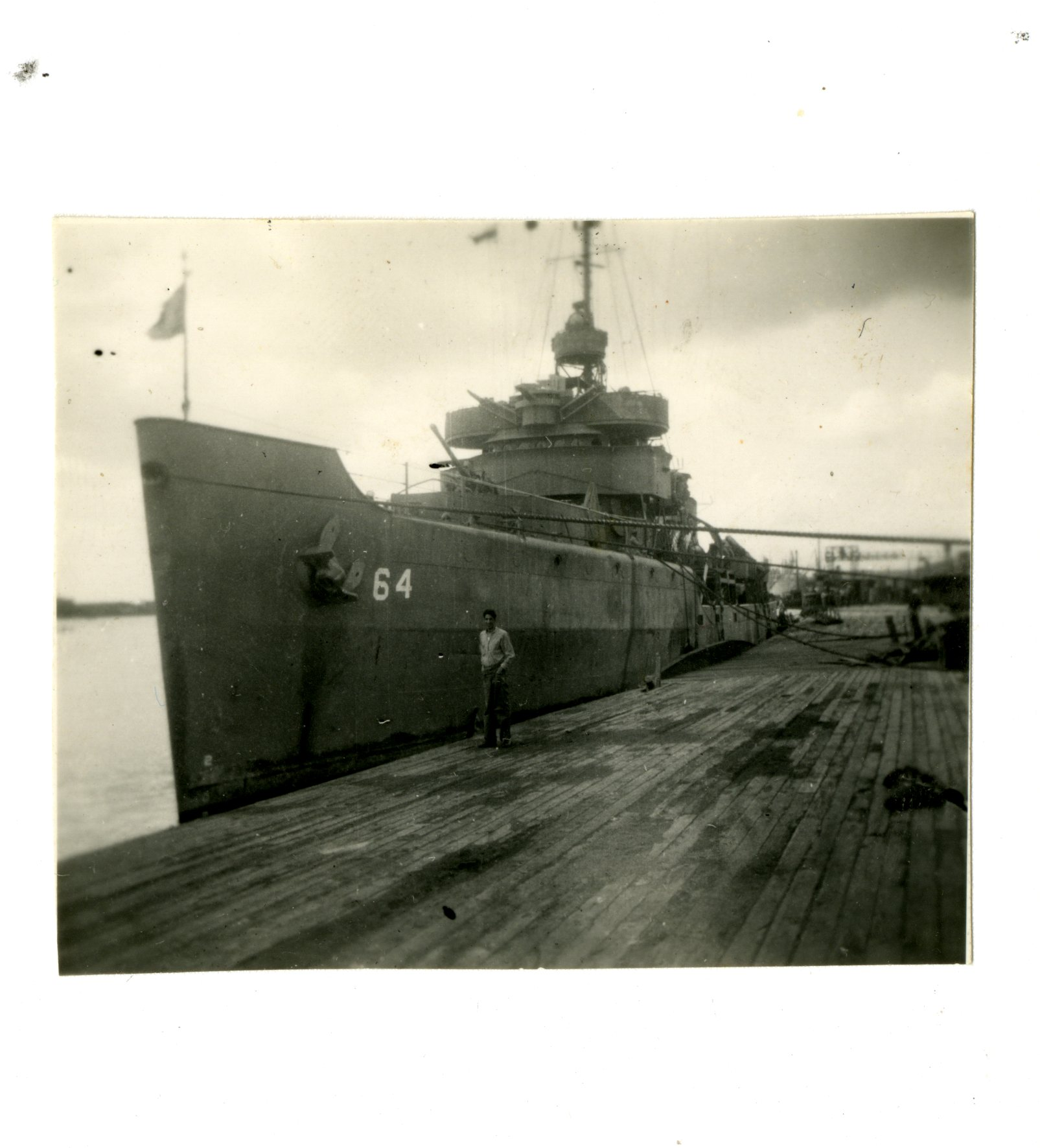
USS Starling Docked in Shanghai.

After fitting out and a short shakedown period, Starling sortied from San Francisco, California, on 22 January 1943 with a convoy bound for Hawaii and arrived at Pearl Harbor on 1 February. On 16 April, she sailed for the South Pacific. From 25 April to early July, the minesweeper shuttled between Fiji, Samoa, New Zealand, the New Hebrides, and New Caledonia. She escorted a convoy from Noumea to Guadalcanal on 2 July and, from the 5th to the 16th, patrolled in the Solomon Islands between Lunga and Tulagi. She then resumed inter-island convoy duty which occupied her until mid-October.

Starling, with Dash (AM-88) and Constant (AM-86), swept the Ferguson Passage off Kolombangara from 23 to 27 October, and they destroyed 135 mines. From, 29 October to 1 November, they cleared the minefield in Kula Gulf and then swept Vella Gulf from 3 to 6 November. Starling next sailed for New Zealand and arrived at Auckland on 30 November 1943.

Starling resumed convoy duty until 10 May 1944, when she was assigned to assist in transporting the V Amphibious Corps from the Guadalcanal staging area. This was the Southern Attack Force for the amphibious assault against Guam. Later in the month, the force held practice landings off Cape Esperance and finally departed on 4 June for the Marshall Islands. The minesweeper left Kwajalein on 17 July with Task Group (TG) 53.9, the Minesweeping and Hydrographic Unit, for Guam. She performed antisubmarine and patrol duty and remained in the Marianas until sailing for Eniwetok on 19 September.

Starling steamed from Eniwetok to Hawaii and departed Pearl Harbor on 7 October for the U.S. West Coast and a yard overhaul. She arrived at San Francisco, California on 14 October 1944 and remained on the west coast until 1 February 1945 when she sailed, via Pearl Harbor, for the Marshall Islands. The minesweeper arrived in the Marshall Islands on 28 February and was assigned to Minesweeper Group I, TG 52.4, for the invasion of the Ryukyus. She operated off Okinawa from 6 April to 4 May and then sailed for the Philippines. From Leyte, the ship moved to Iwo Jima and back to Okinawa which she reached on 18 August, three days after hostilities ended.

Starling swept mines in the Chu Shan archipelago, off the China coast, from 7 September to 30 October before calling at Shanghai. She sailed from that port on 17 November for Japan and arrived at Sasebo, Japan, two days later. The ship operated in Japanese waters until 28 December 1945 when she steamed for the U.S. west coast via Saipan, Eniwetok, Johnston Island, and Pearl Harbor. She arrived at Pearl Harbor on 5 February 1946 and at San Diego, California, nine days later.

== Decommissioning ==
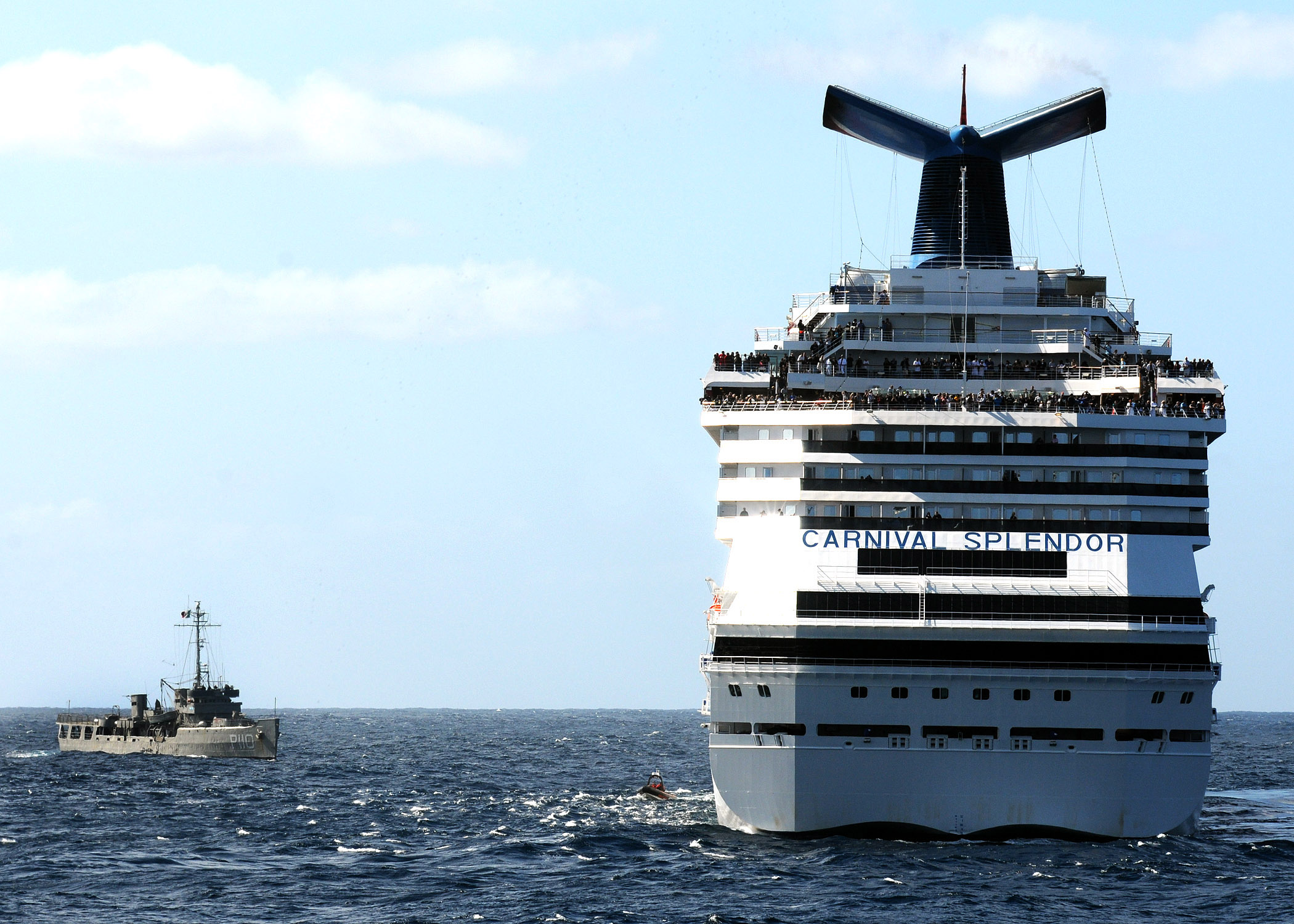
Mexican navy vessel ARM Valentín Gómez Farías (P110) next to the cruise ship Carnival Splendor.

Starling was placed in reserve, out of commission, on 15 May 1946. In October 1948, she was towed to a berthing area at Long Beach, California. On 7 February 1955, the ship was reclassified MSF-64. She was struck from the Navy list on 1 July 1972 and sold to the government of Mexico on 16 February 1973, renamed ARM Valentín Gómez Farías (C79). Her pennant number was later changed to G11, and changed again in 1993 to P110. As of February 2026, Valentín Gómez Farías was in active service with the Mexican Navy.

== Awards ==
Starling received three battle stars for World War II service.
