= USS Firm (AM-98) =

Minesweeper of the United States Navy

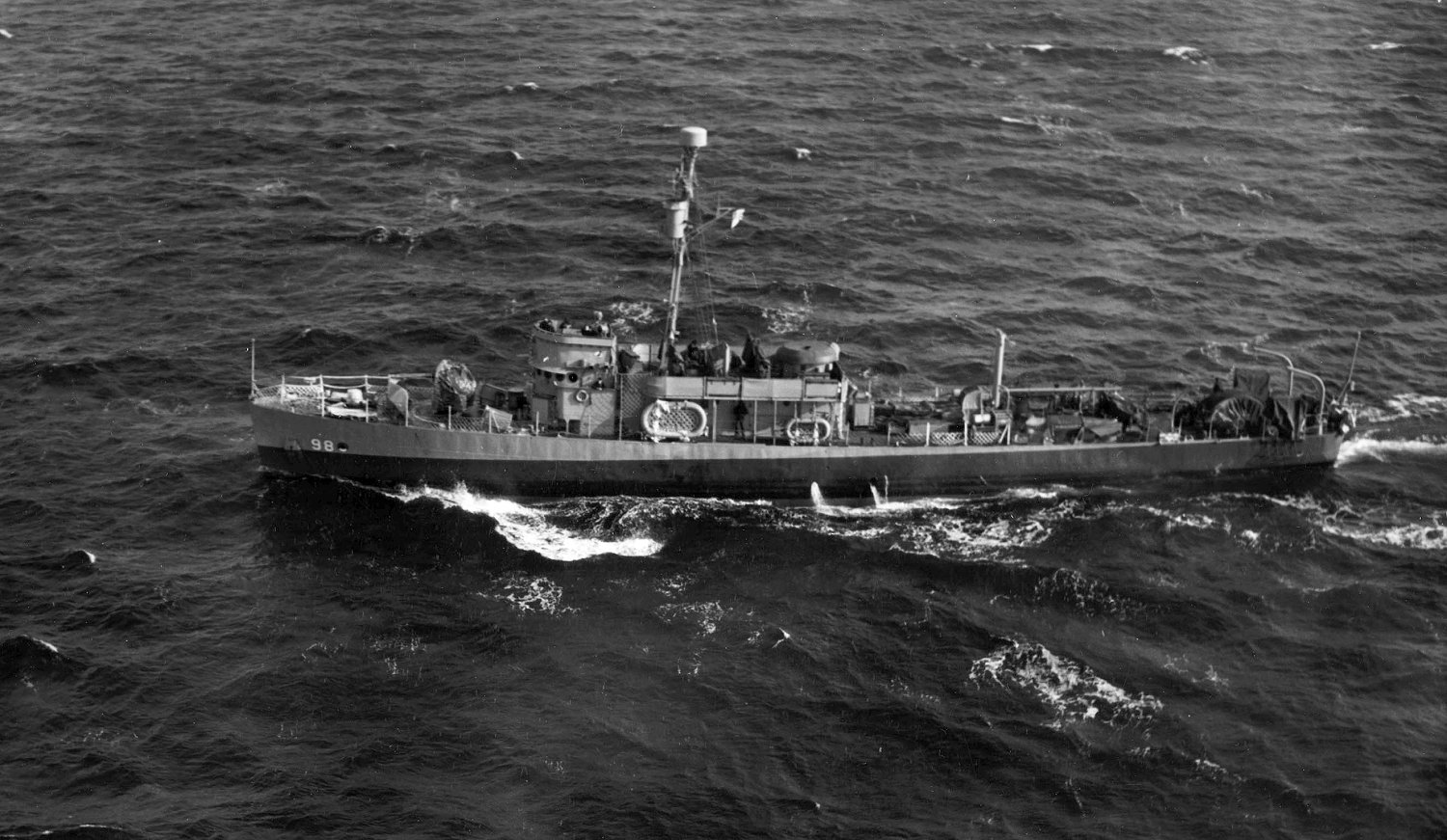
- Firm off Boon Island Light, near York, Maine on 14 February 1944

History

United States
- Name: USS Firm
- Builder: Penn-Jersey Corporation, Camden, New Jersey
- Laid down: 21 October 1941
- Launched: 29 May 1942
- Commissioned: 10 April 1943
- Renamed: USS PC-1602, 1 June 1944
- Renamed: USS PCC-1602, 1 August 1945
- Fate: Transferred to the Maritime Commission, 15 June 1948

General characteristics
- Class & type: Adroit-class minesweeper
- Displacement: 295 long tons (300 t)
- Length: 173 ft 8 in (52.93 m)
- Beam: 23 ft (7.0 m)
- Draft: 11 ft 7 in (3.53 m)
- Propulsion: 2 × 1,440 bhp (1,074 kW) Busch-Sulzer BS 539 diesel engines (Serial Nos. BS1145 & BS1146); Farrel-Birmingham single reduction gear; 2 shafts
- Speed: 17 knots (31 km/h)
- Complement: 65
- Armament: 1 × 3"/50 caliber gun; 1 × 40 mm gun

USS Firm (AM-98) was an Adroit-class minesweeper of the United States Navy. Laid down on 21 October 1941 by the Penn-Jersey Corp., Camden, New Jersey, launched on 29 May 1942, and commissioned on 10 April 1943. The vessel was reclassified as a submarine chaser PC-1602 on 1 June 1944; it was later reclassified as a control submarine chaser PCC-1602 on 1 August 1945. Very little information is available about the activities of this vessel while operating as a submarine chaser. PC-1602 was transferred to the Maritime Commission for disposal on 15 June 1948, and sold to Walter H. Wilms. Fate unknown.
