= USS PC-1603 =

Submarine chaser of the United States Navy during World War II

History

United States
- Name: USS Force
- Builder: Penn-Jersey Corp., Camden, New Jersey
- Laid down: 19 November 1941
- Launched: 7 September 1942
- Commissioned: 16 June 1943
- Renamed: USS PC-1603, 1 June 1944
- Decommissioned: 21 June 1945
- Honors and awards: 3 battle stars (World War II)
- Fate: Destroyed, 24 October 1945

General characteristics
- Class & type: Adroit-class minesweeper
- Displacement: 295 long tons (300 t)
- Length: 173 ft 8 in (52.93 m)
- Beam: 23 ft (7.0 m)
- Draft: 7 ft 7 in (2.31 m)
- Propulsion: 2 × 1,440 bhp (1,074 kW) Busch-Sulzer BS 539 diesel engines (Serial Nos. BS1147 & BS1148); Farrel-Birmingham single reduction gear; 2 shafts
- Speed: 17 knots (31 km/h)
- Complement: 65
- Armament: 1 × 3 in (76 mm)/50 cal; 2 × 40 mm gun; 8 × 20 mm cannons; 5 × depth charge projectors; 2 × depth charge tracks

USS PC-1603 was a submarine chaser of the United States Navy during World War II. She was originally built and commissioned as USS Force (AM-99), an Adroit-class minesweeper. On 1 June, she was renamed PC-1603 and earned three battle stars for service in the Pacific during the war. The ship was damaged by a pair of kamikaze aircraft on 26 May 1945 and later scuttled.

== Career ==
Force was laid down on 19 November 1941 by the Penn-Jersey Corp., Camden, New Jersey, launched on 7 September 1942, and commissioned on 16 June 1943. The ship was reclassified a submarine chaser PC-1603 on 1 June 1944.

On 26 May 1945, while anchored in Kimmu Wan, Okinawa, PC-1603 was struck by two Kawasaki Ki-61 "Tony" kamikaze aircraft. The first hit the bow at the water line and the second hit the bow at deck level. Three people died and 15 wounded mostly from burns.

On 21 June 1945 PC-1603 was decommissioned and towed to the ship graveyard at Kerama Retto. The hulk was ordered destroyed on 24 October 1945. The hull was incorporated in the building of a breakwater/dock and officially donated to the Government of the Ryukyu Islands on 10 July 1957.

PC-1603 was awarded three battle stars for the Leyte, Luzon and Okinawa landings.
