= USS Fidelity (AM-96) =

Minesweeper of the United States Navy

History

United States
- Name: USS Fidelity
- Builder: Nashville Bridge Company, Nashville, Tennessee
- Laid down: 15 October 1941
- Launched: 28 February 1942
- Commissioned: 9 September 1942
- Renamed: USS PC-1600, 1 June 1944
- Honors and awards: 2 battle stars (World War II)
- Fate: Transferred to the Maritime Commission, 15 June 1948

General characteristics
- Class & type: Adroit-class minesweeper
- Displacement: 295 long tons (300 t)
- Length: 173 ft 8 in (52.93 m)
- Beam: 23 ft (7.0 m)
- Draft: 11 ft 7 in (3.53 m)
- Propulsion: 2 × 1,440 bhp (1,074 kW) Busch-Sulzer BS 539 diesel engines (Serial Nos. BS1141 & BS1142); 2 shafts
- Speed: 17 knots (31 km/h)
- Complement: 66
- Armament: 1 × 3"/50 caliber gun; 1 × 40 mm gun

USS Fidelity (AM-96) was an Adroit-class minesweeper of the United States Navy. Laid down on 15 October 1941 by the Nashville Bridge Company of Nashville, Tennessee, launched on 28 February 1942, and commissioned on 9 September 1942. The ship was reclassified as a submarine chaser USS PC-1600 on 1 June 1944.

PC-1600 was decommissioned, (date unknown), and transferred to the Maritime Commission on 15 June 1948, and sold to Charles Weaver. Struck from the Naval Register, (date unknown). Fate unknown. PC-1600 earned two battle stars for World War II service.
