= La Croix-Valmer =

- Commune
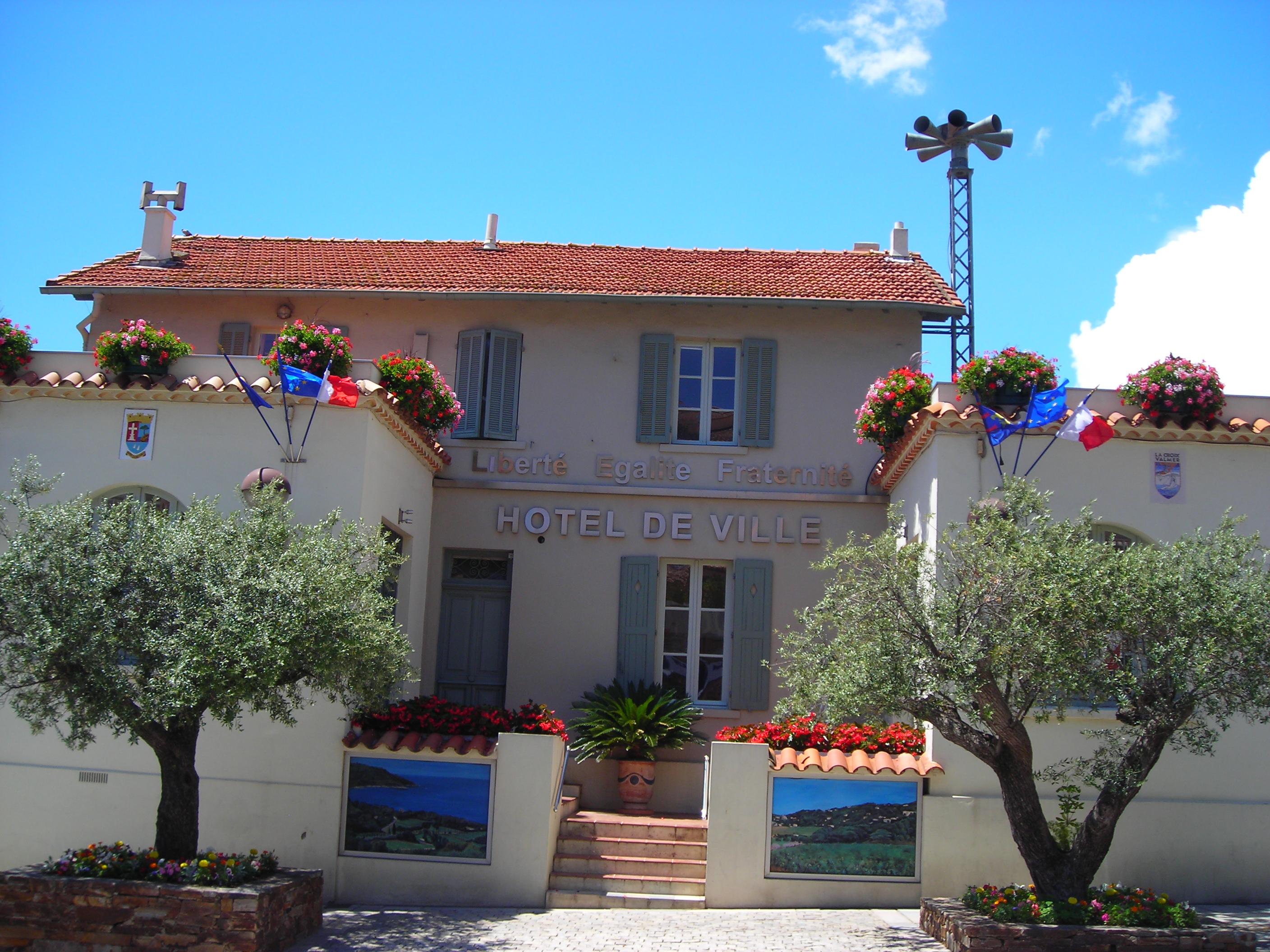
- The town hall of La Croix-Valmer

- Coat of arms
- Location of La Croix-Valmer
- Location within France Location within Provence-Alpes-Côte d'Azur
- Coordinates: 43°12′31″N 6°34′08″E
- Country: France
- Region: Provence-Alpes-Côte d'Azur
- Department: Var
- Arrondissement: Draguignan
- Canton: Sainte-Maxime

Government
  - Mayor (2020–2026): Bernard Jobert
- Area^{1}: 22.28 km^{2} (8.60 sq mi)
- Elevation: 100 m (330 ft)
- Highest elevation: 369 m (1,211 ft)
- Lowest elevation: 0 m (0 ft)
- Population (2023): 3,855
  - Density: 173.0/km^{2} (448.1/sq mi)
- Time zone: UTC+01:00 (CET)
  - Summer (DST): UTC+02:00 (CEST)
- INSEE/Postal code: 83048 /83420
- ^{1} French Land Register data, which excludes lakes, ponds, glaciers > 1 km^{2} (0.386 sq mi or 247 acres) and river estuaries.

La Croix-Valmer (French pronunciation: [la kʁwa valmɛʁ]; Occitan: La Crotz Valmer) is a commune in the Var department in the Provence-Alpes-Côte d'Azur region in southeastern France.

== Geography ==
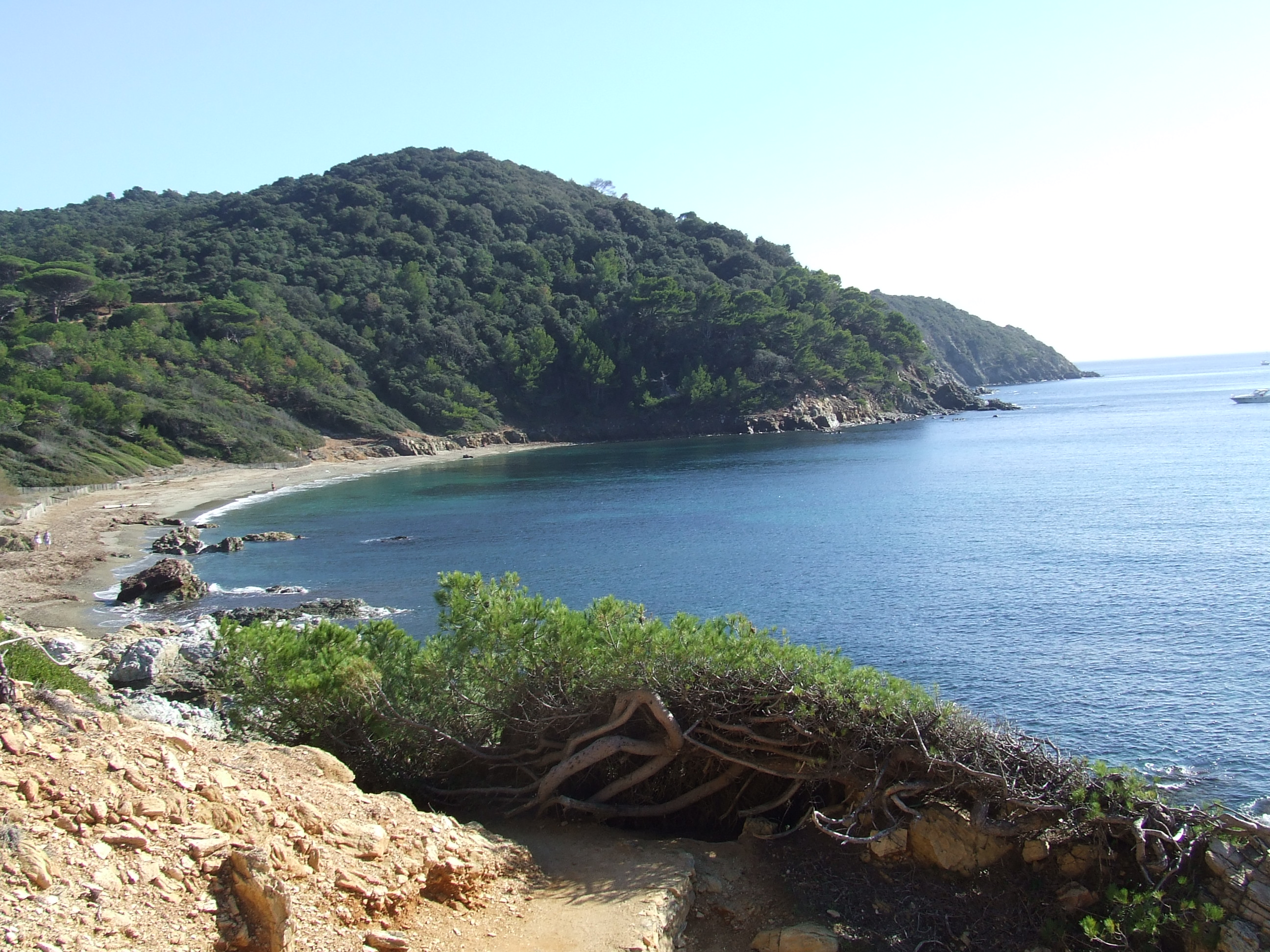

La Croix-Valmer is at the foot of the Massif des Maures hills in the Bay of Cavalaire-sur-Mer, halfway between Le Lavandou and Saint-Tropez.

== History ==
The Emperor Constantine the Great, on the way to wage war against his brother-in-law Maxentius in 312 AD, is said to have had a vision of a cross in the sky stating "in hoc signo vinces" (by this sign you will conquer) at the location where La Croix-Valmer is now situated. On April 16, 1893, a stone cross was erected on the site where tradition holds this vision occurred. La Croix-Valmer became a commune on 6 April 1934, separating from the commune of Gassin.

The area has been inhabited since ancient times, as demonstrated by the discovery of remains such as prehistoric tools, cists, and the Roman farm of Pardigon (dating from the third century BC).

During the Second World War, the beaches of La Croix-Valmer were part of the Allied invasion of Provence during Operation Dragoon. The name of one of the local beaches, Plage du Débarquement ("Landing Beach"), bears witness to this.

Abel Faivre (1853-1945), a French painter, lived in La Croix Valmer, near the Gigaro beach.

== Population ==
Historical population
Year	Pop.	±% p.a.
1968	1,380	—
1975	1,759	+3.53%
1982	2,064	+2.31%
1990	2,634	+3.10%
1999	2,734	+0.41%
2007	3,194	+1.96%
2012	3,509	+1.90%
2017	3,780	+1.50%
2023	3,855	+0.33%
Source: INSEE

== See also ==
- Communes of the Var department
- Baie de Briande
