= Abel Faivre =

French artist (1867–1945)

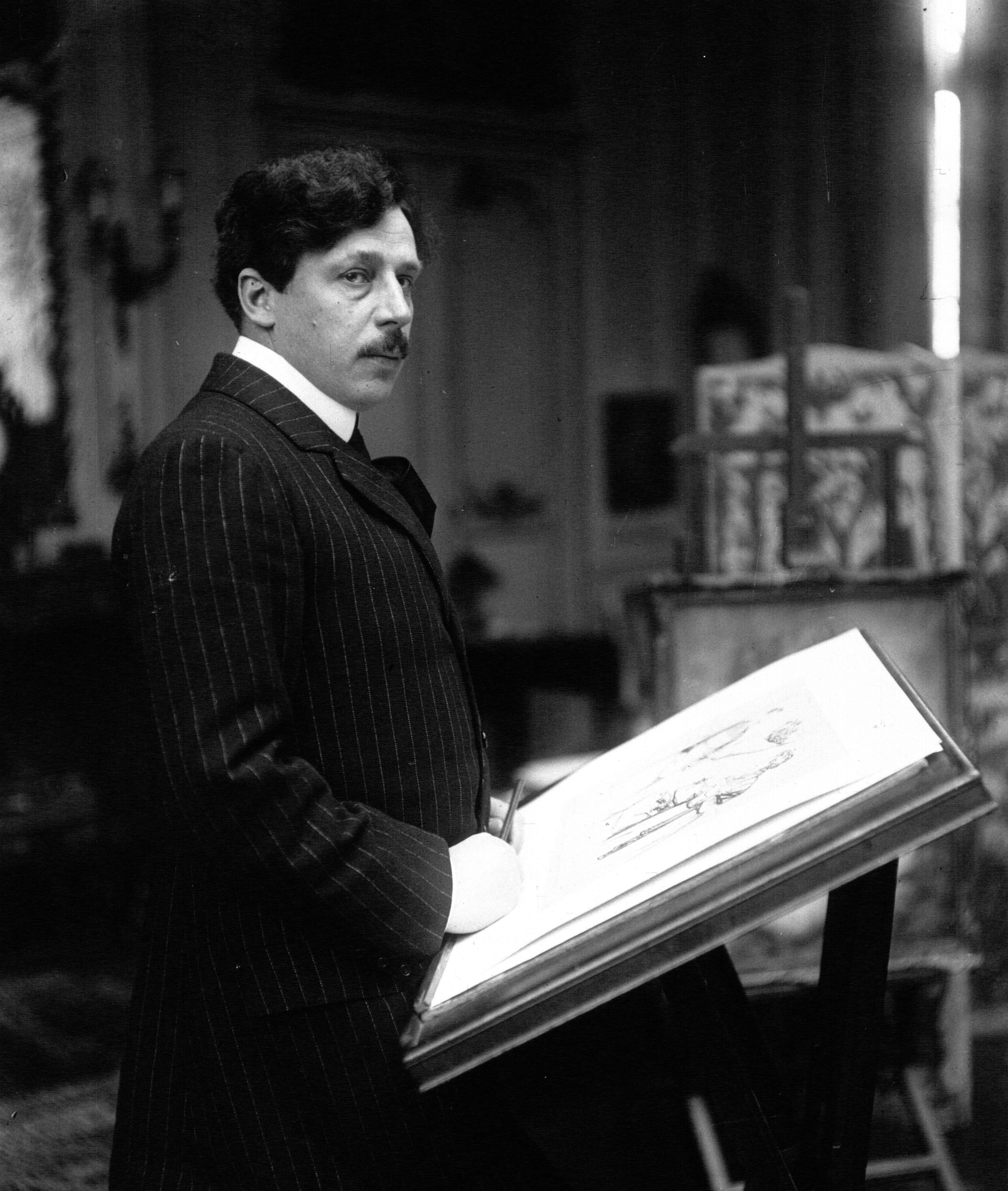
- Faivre in 1913
- Born: Jules Abel Faivre; 30 March 1867; Lyon, France
- Died: 13 August 1945 (aged 78); Nice, France
- Education: École nationale supérieure des beaux-arts de Lyon; Société Nationale des Beaux-Arts; Académie Julian
- Occupations: Painter; illustrator; cartoonist

Jules Abel Faivre (30 March 1867 – 13 August 1945) was a French painter, illustrator and cartoonist.

== Early life and work ==
Jules Abel Faivre was born in Lyon, France. He attended École nationale des beaux-arts de Lyon for three years. He then attended the Société Nationale des Beaux-Arts and Académie Julian. He was a member of the Société des Artistes Français. He lived in La Croix-Valmer. Professionally, he created propaganda posters for the French Army in World War I. He drew comics for Le Rire, L'Écho de Paris, and Le Figaro.

== Later life and legacy ==
Faivre died on 13 August 1945 in Nice, France. A boulevard is named after Faivre in La Croix-Valmer. His work is held in the collections of the National Library of Medicine, the University of Michigan, the Museum of Modern Art, the Stedelijk Museum Amsterdam, the Louvre Museum in Paris, Milwaukee Art Museum, and the Brooklyn Museum.

== Collections ==
- Musée d'Orsay, La Femme à l'éventail, Nature morte à l'aiguière et aux fruits
- British Museum
- Chicago Art Institute

== Gallery ==
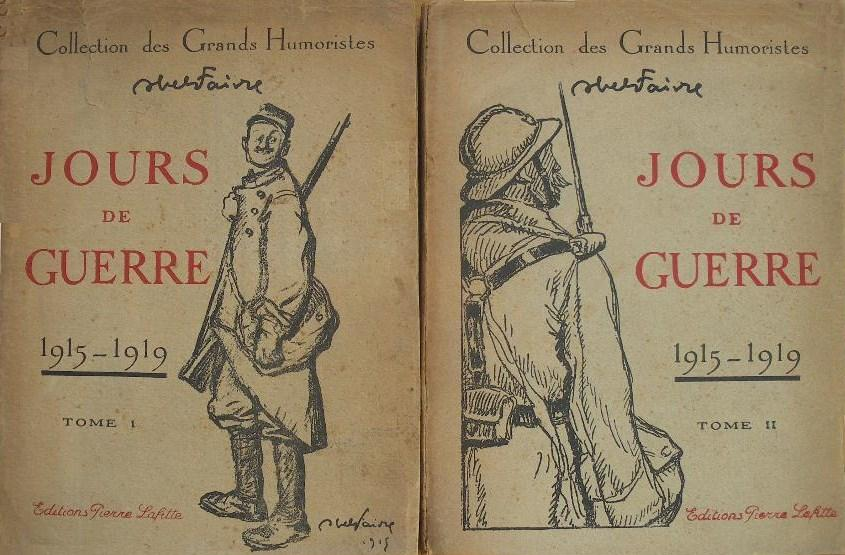
Cover art for a French comic book

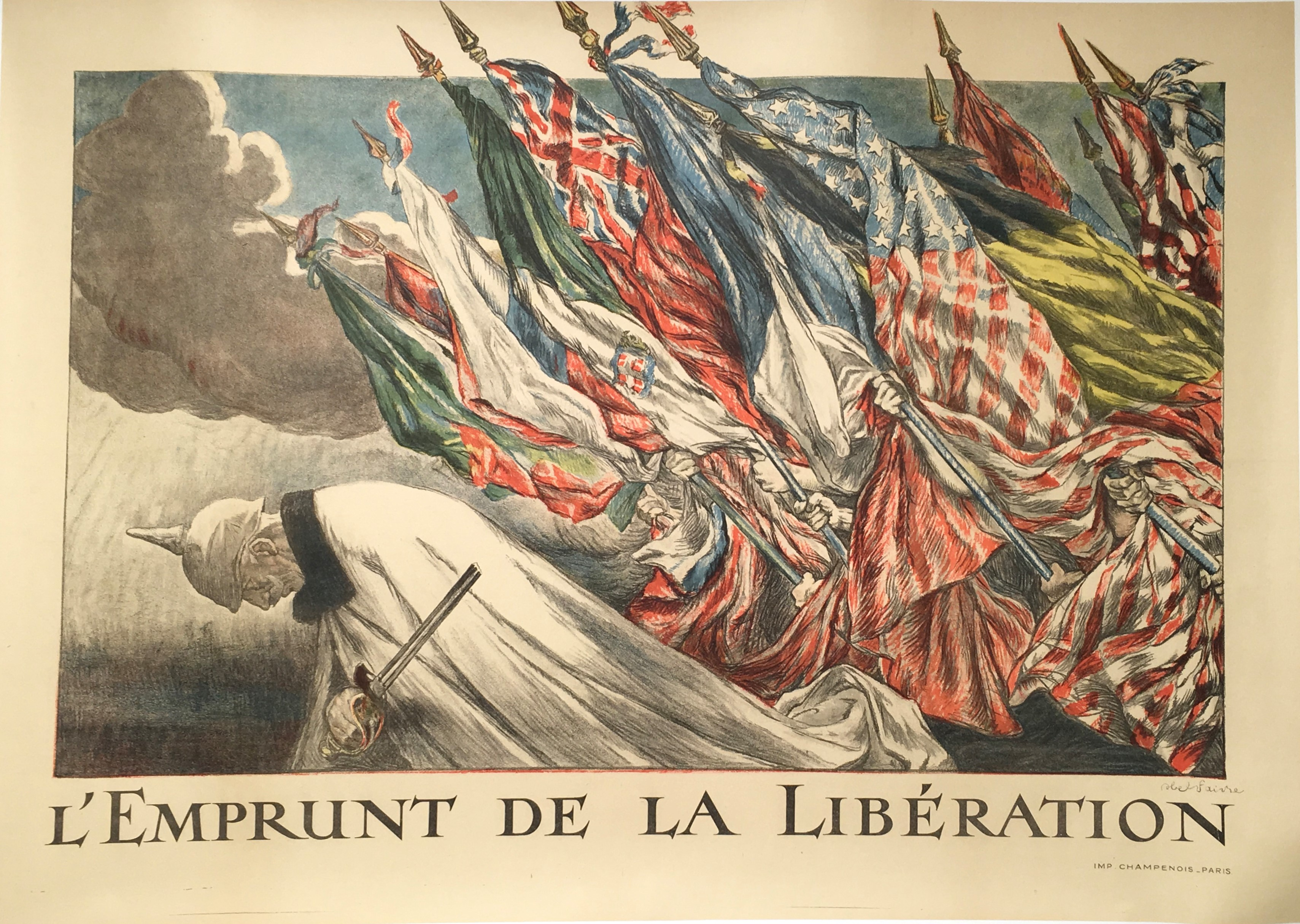
Poster requesting donations for "Loan For Freedom" to help beat Germany in World War One
