= USS Exploit (AM-95) =

Minesweeper of the United States Navy

History

United States
- Name: USS Exploit
- Builder: Jacobson Shipyard, Inc., Oyster Bay, Long Island, New York
- Laid down: 11 May 1942
- Launched: 7 September 1942
- Commissioned: 5 February 1943
- Renamed: USS PC-1599, 1 June 1944
- Renamed: USS PCC-1599, 20 August 1945
- Decommissioned: 14 December 1945
- Honors and awards: 2 battle stars (World War II)
- Fate: Transferred to the Maritime Commission, 18 March 1949

General characteristics
- Class & type: Adroit-class minesweeper
- Displacement: 275 long tons (279 t)
- Length: 173 ft 8 in (52.93 m)
- Beam: 23 ft (7.0 m)
- Draft: 7 ft 7 in (2.31 m)
- Propulsion: 2 × 1,770 bhp (1,320 kW) Cooper Bessemer GNB-8 diesel engines (Serial No. 1987 & 1988); Farrel-Birmingham single reduction gear; 2 shafts
- Speed: 18 knots (33 km/h)
- Complement: 65
- Armament: 1 × 3"/50 caliber gun; 1 × 40 mm gun

USS Exploit (AM-95) was an Adroit-class minesweeper of the United States Navy. Laid down on 11 May 1942 by the Jakobson Shipyard, Inc., Oyster Bay, Long Island, New York, launched on 7 September 1942, and commissioned on 5 February 1943. The ship was reclassified as a submarine chaser, PC-1599, 1 June 1944, and reclassified again as a control submarine chaser, PCC-1599, 20 August 1945.

== East Coast operations ==
Between 25 February and 12 May 1943, Exploit served on patrol, swept mines, and joined in amphibious exercises in Chesapeake Bay, based at Norfolk, Virginia. She performed similar duty in Casco Bay, Maine until 13 May 1944, when she returned to Norfolk for conversion to a submarine chaser.

== Operating as a submarine chaser ==
PC-1599 sailed from Norfolk on 9 June 1944 on escort duty, bound for the Pacific. She arrived at Eniwetok on 1 October, and for the next five months served on local escort and patrol in the Marshalls and Marianas, arriving at Iwo Jima on 6 March escorting an LST. Sailing from Ulithi on 25 March to escort a convoy bound for Okinawa, she served as primary control vessel for "Yellow Beach" during the initial landings on 1 April. PC-1599 continued to patrol off Okinawa and screen shipping lying off the island until 1 June.

After a brief overhaul, PC-1599 cleared Kerama Retto on 24 June 1945, bound for the west coast. The ship was reclassified as a Control Submarine Chaser, PCC-1599 on 20 August 1945.

== Decommissioning ==
PC-1599 was decommissioned on 14 December 1945 at San Francisco, California; transferred to the Maritime Commission for disposal on 18 March 1949, and sold the same day to the California Co., New Orleans, Louisiana. The ship was resold in 1961 to the Submarex Corp., Santa Barbara, California, and retained the name Exploit. Fate unknown.

PC-1599 received two battle stars for World War II service.
