= USS Effective (AM-92) =

Minesweeper of the United States Navy

History

United States
- Name: USS Effective
- Builder: Dravo Corporation, Neville Island, Pittsburgh, Pennsylvania
- Laid down: 9 January 1942
- Launched: 13 June 1942
- Commissioned: 1 October 1942
- Renamed: USS PC-1596, 1 June 1944
- Decommissioned: 9 November 1945
- Honors and awards: 1 battle star (World War II)
- Fate: Transferred to the Maritime Commission, 30 July 1946

General characteristics
- Class & type: Adroit-class minesweeper
- Displacement: 295 long tons (300 t)
- Length: 173 ft 8 in (52.93 m)
- Beam: 23 ft (7.0 m)
- Draft: 11 ft 7 in (3.53 m)
- Propulsion: 2 × 1,770 bhp (1,320 kW) Cooper Bessemer GNB-8 diesel engines (Serial No. 1975 & 1976); 2 shafts
- Speed: 17 knots (31 km/h)
- Complement: 66
- Armament: 1 × 3"/50 caliber gun; 1 × 40 mm gun

USS Effective (AM-92) was an Adroit-class minesweeper of the United States Navy. Laid down on 9 February 1942 by the Dravo Corporation, Neville Island, Pittsburgh, Pennsylvania, launched on 12 June 1942, and commissioned on 1 October 1942. The ship was reclassified as a submarine chaser, PC-1596 on 1 June 1944.

== World War II Atlantic Operations ==
Effective sailed from New Orleans, Louisiana, on 11 November 1942, and called at Key West, Florida, and Charleston, South Carolina, before arriving at Norfolk, Virginia, 8 January 1943. After intensive training, she arrived in Bermuda in February. She remained there on patrol and local escort, with occasional escort voyages to ports on the east coast, until 7 July 1944. Sailing from Bermuda she rendezvoused with a convoy bound for the Mediterranean.

== As submarine chaser PC-1596 ==
On 15 August 1944 PC-1596 saw action in the invasion of southern France. She continued to support the operation by escorting convoys among various Mediterranean ports, training and patrol. She departed Oran 27 May 1945 for the east coast and arrived at Jacksonville, Florida, in June.

She was decommissioned on 9 November 1945 at Jacksonville, Florida, transferred to the Maritime Commission for disposal on 30 July 1946, and sold to Mechanical Equipment, New Orleans, Louisiana. Fate unknown.

PC-1596 received one battle star for World War II service.
