= USS Conflict (AM-85) =

Minesweeper of the United States Navy

History

United States
- Name: USS Conflict
- Builder: Commercial Iron Works, Portland, Oregon
- Launched: 18 April 1942
- Commissioned: 7 September 1942
- Renamed: USS PC-1589, 1 June 1944
- Decommissioned: 31 May 1946
- Honours and awards: 2 battle stars (World War II)
- Fate: Transferred to War Assets Administration, 3 December 1947

General characteristics
- Class & type: Adroit-class minesweeper
- Displacement: 295 long tons (300 t)
- Length: 173 ft 8 in (52.93 m)
- Beam: 23 ft (7.0 m)
- Draft: 11 ft 7 in (3.53 m)
- Propulsion: 2 × 1,770 bhp (1,320 kW) Cooper Bessemer GNB8 diesel engines; Farrel-Birmingham single reduction gear; 2 shafts
- Speed: 16 knots (30 km/h)
- Complement: 65
- Armament: 1 × 3 in (76 mm)/50 cal; 1 × 40 mm gun

USS Conflict (AM-85) was an Adroit-class minesweeper of the United States Navy. The ship was launched on 18 April 1942 by Commercial Iron Works, Portland, Oregon; and commissioned 7 September 1942.

== World War II Pacific Theatre Operations ==
Clearing Seattle, Washington, 7 December 1942, Conflict called at San Francisco, California, and Pearl Harbor before arriving at Espiritu Santo, New Hebrides, 29 January 1943. From this base she sailed on antisubmarine patrols in the Solomons and escorted convoys throughout the Solomons and the Florida Islands until 2 July 1945.

== Converted to Submarine Chaser PC-1589 ==
On 1 June 1944 her name was canceled and her classification changed to PC-1589.

Arriving at Nouméa, New Caledonia 4 July 1945 PC-1589 visited Auckland, New Zealand, from 10 to 21 July, then escorted U.S. Navy crash boats to the Ellice, Wallis, Fiji, and New Hebrides Islands. After the end of the war she remained in New Caledonia serving as pilot ship until 7 March 1946 when she got underway for an overhaul at Pago Pago, Samoa, sailing on to arrive in Pearl Harbor 1 May.

== Post-War Deactivation ==
She decommissioned 31 May 1946, and transferred to the War Assets Administration for disposal 3 December 1947.

== Awards ==
PC-1589 received two battle stars for World War II service.
