= USS Fierce =

Minesweeper of the United States Navy

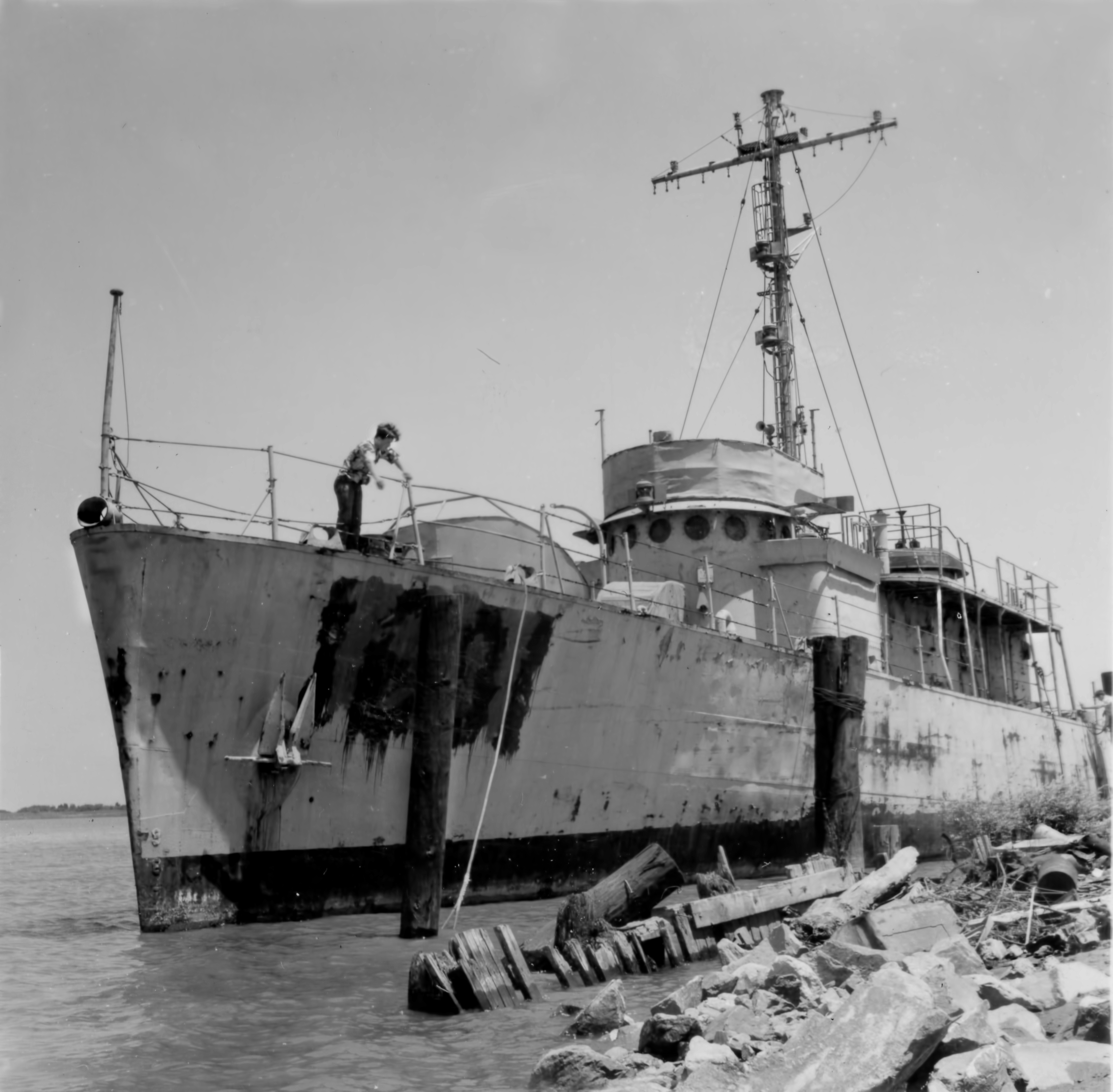

History

United States
- Name: USS Fierce
- Builder: Nashville Bridge Company, Nashville, Tennessee
- Laid down: 18 October 1941
- Launched: 5 March 1942
- Commissioned: 12 October 1942
- Renamed: USS PC-1601, 1 June 1944
- Renamed: USS PCC-1601, 20 August 1945
- Decommissioned: December 1945
- Honors and awards: 2 battle stars (World War II)
- Fate: Transferred to the Maritime Commission, 15 June 1948

General characteristics
- Class & type: Adroit-class minesweeper
- Displacement: 295 long tons (300 t)
- Length: 173 ft 8 in (52.93 m)
- Beam: 23 ft (7.0 m)
- Draft: 11 ft 7 in (3.53 m)
- Propulsion: 2 × 1,440 bhp (1,074 kW) Busch-Sulzer BS 539 diesel engines (Serial Nos. BS1143 & BS1144); Farrel-Birmingham single reduction gear; 2 shafts
- Speed: 16.8 knots (31.1 km/h)
- Complement: 65aa
- Armament: 1 × 3"/50 caliber gun; 1 × 40 mm gun

USS Fierce (AM-97) was an Adroit-class minesweeper of the United States Navy. It was laid down on 18 October 1941 by the Nashville Bridge Co., Nashville, Tennessee; launched on 5 March 1942, and commissioned on 12 October 1942. The ship was reclassified as a submarine chaser, PC-1601 on 1 June 1944, and reclassified as a control submarine chaser PCC-1601 on 20 August 1945.

PC-1601 was decommissioned in December 1945 at San Francisco, California and transferred to the Maritime Commission for disposal on 15 June 1948. Sold to John K. Seaborn and converted into a twin-engined tug and named Seaborn II. Fate unknown. PCC-1601 earned two battle stars for World War II military action.
