= L'Écho de Paris =

Daily newspaper in Paris from 1884 to 1944

L'Écho de Paris (French pronunciation: [leko d(ə) paʁi]) was a daily newspaper in Paris from 1884 to 1944.

The paper's editorial stance was initially conservative and nationalistic, but it later became close to the French Social Party. Its writers included Octave Mirbeau, Henri de Kérillis, Georges Clemenceau, Henry Bordeaux, François Mitterrand, Jérôme Tharaud, and Jean Tharaud. Its editors included Franc-Nohain. Abel Faivre provided illustrations for the publication.

The paper merged with Le Jour in 1933 and changed its name to Jour-Écho de Paris.
