= USS Constant (AM-86) =

Minesweeper of the United States Navy

History

United States
- Name: USS Constant
- Builder: Commercial Iron Works, Portland, Oregon
- Laid down: 21 February 1942
- Launched: 9 May 1942
- Commissioned: 21 September 1942
- Renamed: USS PC-1590, 1 June 1944
- Decommissioned: 19 June 1946
- Recommissioned: 20 March 1951
- Decommissioned: 22 October 1954
- Fate: Sunk as a target ship

General characteristics
- Class & type: Adroit-class minesweeper
- Displacement: 275 long tons (279 t)
- Length: 173 ft 8 in (52.93 m)
- Beam: 23 ft (7.0 m)
- Draft: 7 ft 7 in (2.31 m)
- Propulsion: 2 × 1,770 bhp (1,320 kW) Cooper Bessemer GNB8 diesel engines (Serial No. 1978 & 1979); 2 shafts
- Speed: 18 knots (33 km/h)
- Complement: 65
- Armament: 1 × 3"/50 caliber gun; 1 × 40 mm gun

USS Constant (AM-86) was an Adroit-class minesweeper of the United States Navy. Laid down on 21 February 1942 by the Commercial Iron Works, Portland, Oregon, and launched on 9 May 1942, the ship was commissioned on 21 September 1942.

== World War II Pacific Theatre operations ==
From 20 December 1942 to 4 March 1943 Constant escorted convoys between San Francisco, California, and Pearl Harbor. She sailed from Pearl Harbor 8 March for Espiritu Santo, arriving 25 March for local escort duty, operating from Espiritu Santo and Noumea in support of the Guadalcanal operation.

On 3 September 1943 she arrived at Tulagi and remained in the Solomons on inter-island escort and minesweeping duty with occasional convoy voyages to Nouméa and Espiritu Santo until 3 April 1944, when she steamed to Auckland, New Zealand, for a brief overhaul. She returned to Port Purvis on Florida Island in the Solomons 13 May.

== Reclassified as a submarine chaser ==
On 1 June 1944 her name was canceled and she was reclassified as a submarine chaser PC-1590. She continued her service at Espiritu Santo, Nouméa, Samoa and Tongatapu until 6 May 1946.

== Post-war activity ==
She then returned to Pearl Harbor, where she was decommissioned 19 June 1946. Assigned to the 14th Naval District for Naval Reserve training 28 October 1946, PC-1590 was placed in commission in reserve 5 May 1950, and in full commission from 20 March 1951 until decommissioned 22 October 1954. She was sunk as a target.
