= USS Nahant (AN-83) =

Coordinates: 33.878547°S 58.422440°W

History

United States
- Name: USS Nahant
- Namesake: Nahant
- Builder: Commercial Iron Works, Portland, Oregon
- Laid down: 31 March 1945
- Launched: 30 June 1945
- Commissioned: 24 August 1945
- Decommissioned: 31 July 1946
- Recommissioned: 14 February 1952
- Decommissioned: 30 September 1968
- Stricken: 1 October 1968
- Fate: Sold to Uruguay, 15 October 1968

Uruguay
- Name: ROU Huracan
- Namesake: Huracan
- Acquired: 15 October 1968
- Decommissioned: 25 January 1993
- Identification: BT-30
- Fate: Sold to private owner, converted to a barge
- Status: Extant as a floating workshop/office

General characteristics
- Class & type: Cohoes-class net laying ship
- Displacement: 855 long tons (869 t)
- Length: 169 ft (52 m)
- Beam: 34 ft (10 m)
- Draft: 15 ft (4.6 m)
- Propulsion: Diesel-electric, 2,500 hp (1,864 kW)
- Speed: 12 knots (22 km/h; 14 mph)
- Complement: 54
- Armament: 1 × single 3"/50 caliber gun; 4 × single 20 mm AA gun mounts

USS Nahant (YN-102/AN-83) was the third ship to be named Nahant. Originally the ship was authorized as YN-102, Nahant was reclassified AN–83 on 20 January 1944; laid down 31 March 1945 by the Commercial Iron Works, Portland, Oregon; launched 30 June 1945; sponsored by Mrs. Hazel H. Childs; and commissioned 24 August 1945.

== Service history ==
Commissioned too late for action in World War II, Nahant removed net moorings in the San Francisco Bay area and tested experimental nets until 31 October 1945. She then departed the west coast and steamed to Orange, Texas. Arriving 21 November, she planted moorings, removed pilings and performed tug services for the growing Reserve Fleet until decommissioning and joining the moth ball fleet herself, 31 July 1946.

Recommissioned 14 February 1952 and assigned to the 5th Naval District, Nahant installed and tended harbor defense nets within that district until 1 March 1954, when she temporarily assumed duties as a salvage vessel. By 28 May, however, diving equipment and a decompression chamber had been permanently installed and Nahant was converted into a ship of dual mission: salvage ship and net tender. From that time until 1968, Nahant participated in Mine Hunting Unit operations, harbor clearance projects, NATO and Atlantic Fleet training operations, mining operations, torpedo net laying and recovery operations, fleet service mine tests, harbor defense operations and training exercises, and experimental mine and net test and evaluation exercises. Such operations took Nahant, homeported first at Little Creek, Virginia, and later at Charleston, South Carolina, as far north as Naval Station Argentia and as far south as Cuba. Nahant decommissioned on 30 September 1968 and was struck from the Naval Register 1 October.

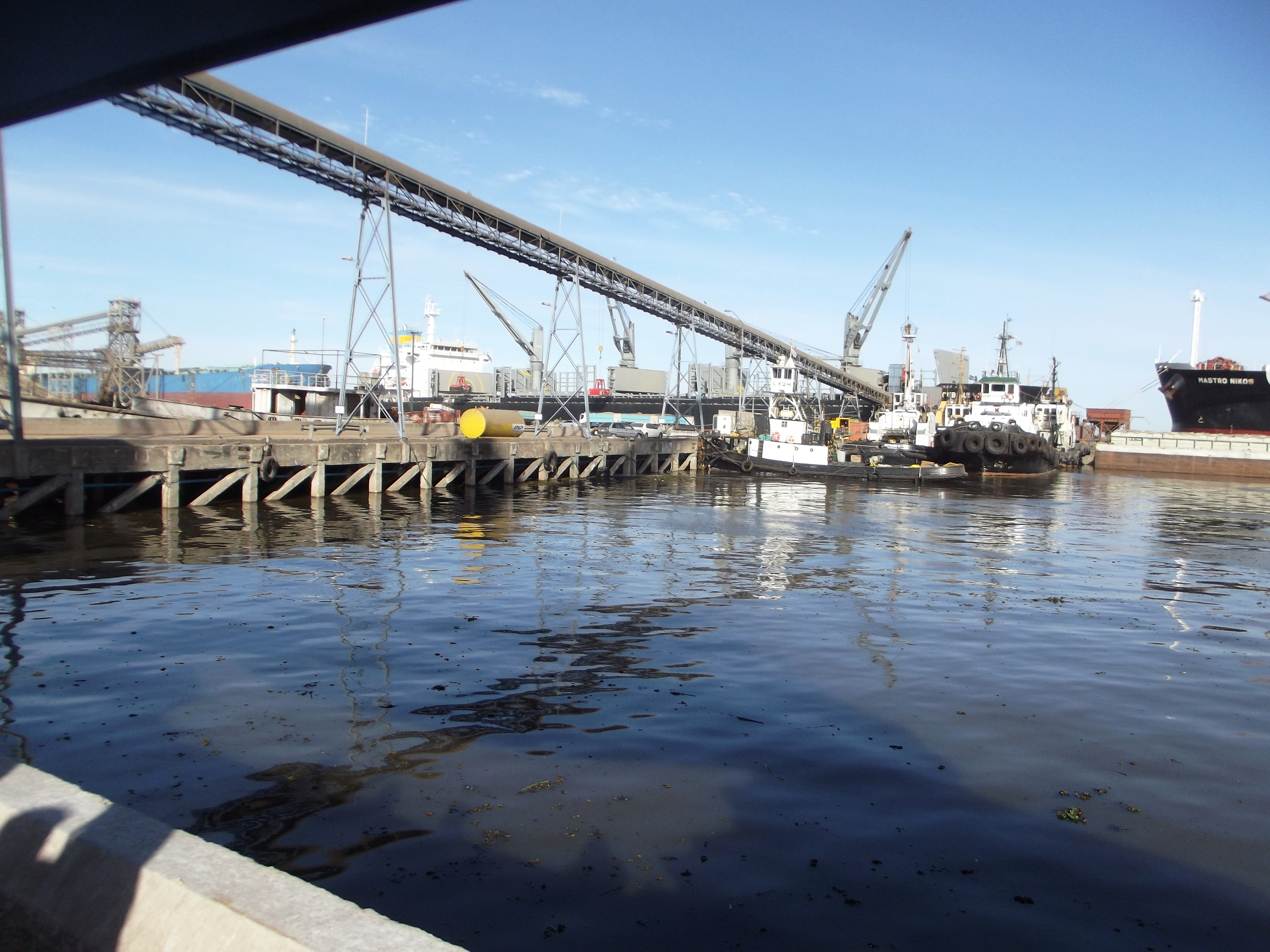
Nuestra Señora De Los 33 in the port of Nueva Palmira, just visible on the opposite side of the dock at left-center of the photo.

On 15 October 1968 she was sold to Uruguay, and renamed ROU Huracan (BT-30). Huracan served a number of auxiliary roles in the National Navy of Uruguay until she was decommissioned on 25 January 1993. She was then acquired by a fishing club in Paysandú and based on the Uruguay River. She was later sold to a private owner, who renamed her Nuestra Señora De Los 33 and converted her into a barge, removing her propulsion. As of October 2020 she remains extant as a floating workshop and office in Nueva Palmira.
