= USS Adroit (SP-248) =

Patrol vessel of the United States Navy

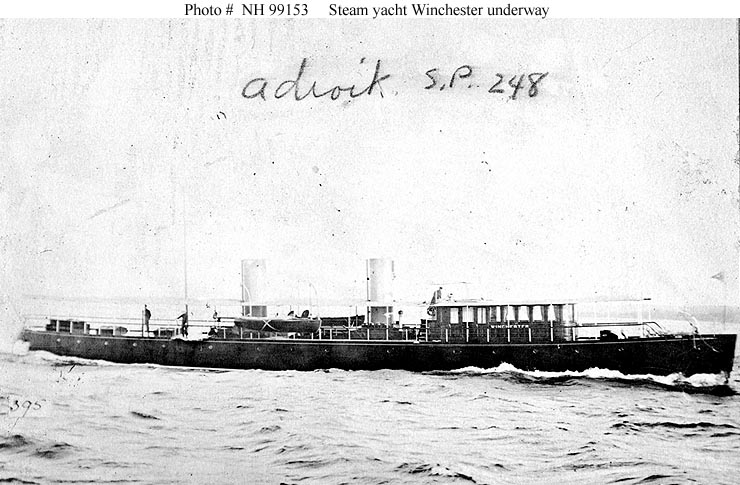
- USS Adroit, USN Special Patrol 248

History

United States
- Name: Winchester (1907–1916); Adroit (1916–1928); Aera (1928–)
- Owner: Peter W. Rouss (original owner); F. H. McAdoo (owner at time of acquisition)
- Builder: Robert Jacob Shipyard, City Island, Bronx, New York
- Launched: 1907
- Fate: Acquired by the USN in 1917

History

United States
- Name: Adroit
- Acquired: 1917
- Fate: Returned to owner 30 April 1918

General characteristics
- Type: Yacht
- Displacement: 147 long tons (149 t)
- Length: 141 ft (43 m)
- Beam: 15 ft 6 in (4.72 m)
- Draft: 5 ft 6 in (1.68 m)
- Speed: 17.5 kn (32.4 km/h; 20.1 mph)
- Complement: 23

USS Adroit (SP-248) was a steam yacht brought into the United States Navy, but never commissioned.

== Service history ==
Adroit was built as Winchester at City Island, New York in 1907 by the Robert Jacobs Shipyard. The first of a series of fast yachts of that name, her owner replaced her with a larger vessel after several years. She was sold and renamed Adroit in about 1916. She was acquired by the Navy in April 1917 from Mr. F. H. McAdoo of New York City.

After she had begun fitting out under the direction of Lt. H. B. Peschau, NNV, Adroit was found to be highly unseaworthy and of extremely short cruising range. Consequently, she was never commissioned and was returned to her owner on 30 April 1918. Presumably, her name—which had appeared on the Navy list— was stricken from that list soon thereafter.

Her subsequent career as a pleasure craft extended for more than another two decades. She was renamed Aera in 1928 and remained listed in yachting registers until the early 1940s.

== Bibliography ==
- Winchester American Steam Yacht, 1907
- "Adroit I (Yacht)". Dictionary of American Naval Fighting Ships. Naval History and Heritage Command. 19 January 2016.
