= Baie de Briande =

Coordinates: 43°10′N 6°38′E

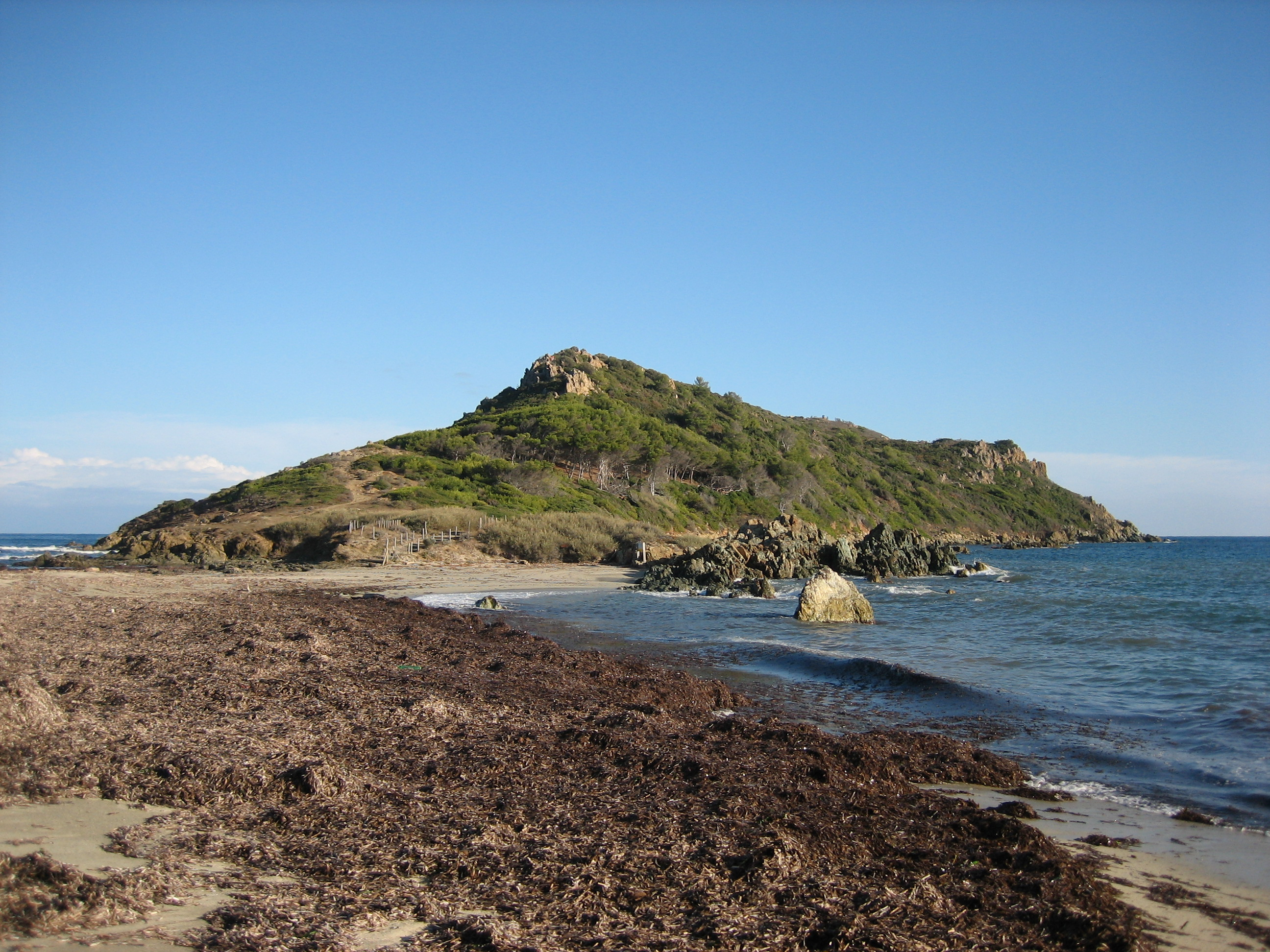
Cap Taillat, at the eastern end of Baie de Briande

Baie de Briande is a bay in La Croix-Valmer, on the French Riviera 12 km (7.5 mi) south of Saint-Tropez. The bay is used by tourists.

The bay and the adjacent land are protected as an aire maritime adjacente and an aire d'adhésion of the Port-Cros National Park.

== History ==
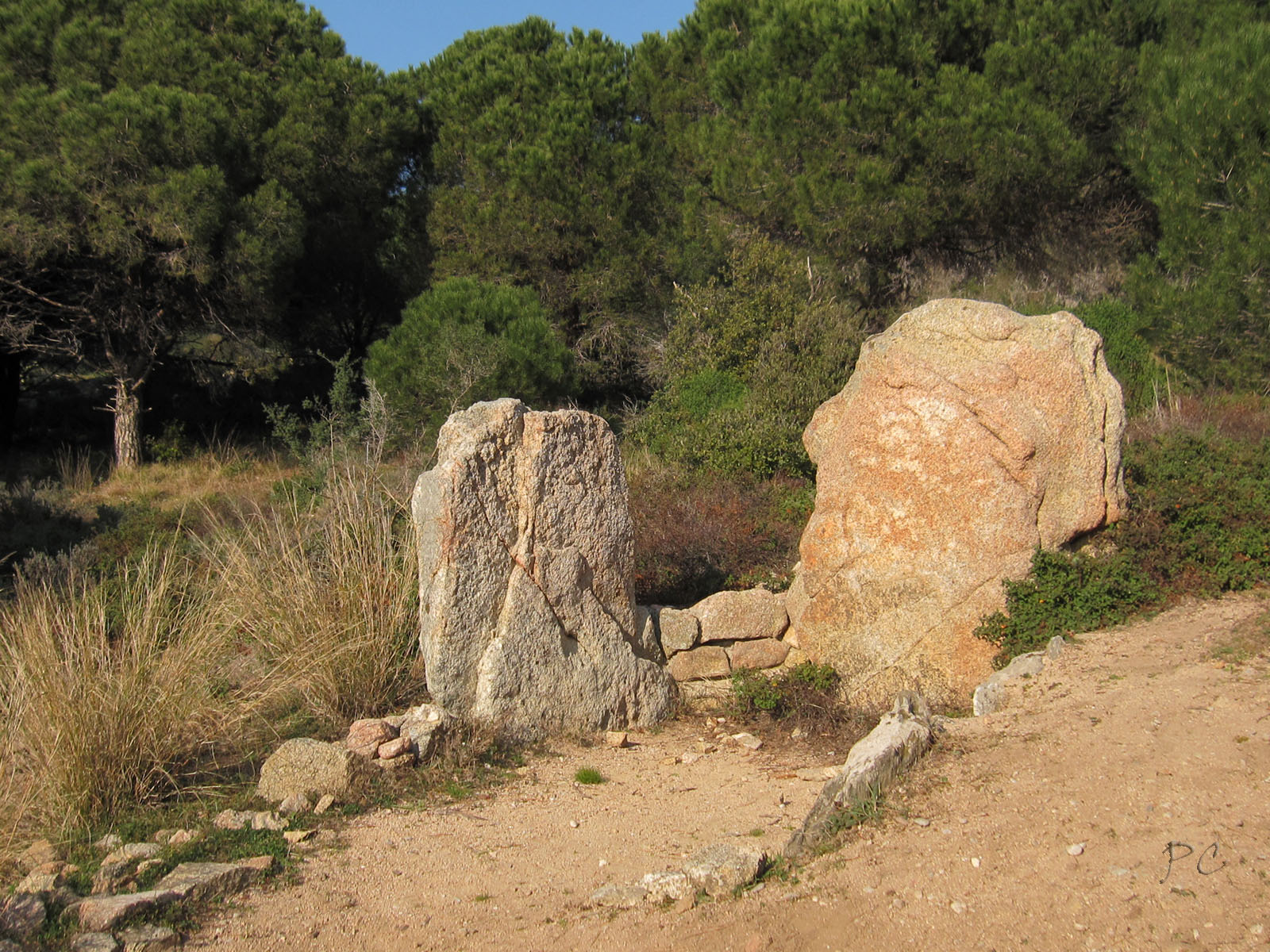
Dolmen de la Briande

The Dolmen de la Briande is a prehistoric dolmen located 300 m inland.

Allied forces landed at the bay in August 1944 as part of Operation Dragoon, the invasion of southern France during World War II.

Cap Taillat, the headland at the eastern end of the bay, was used for filming the 1968 film Chitty Chitty Bang Bang.
