= USS Adroit (AM-82) =

Adroit-class minesweeper of the United States Navy

History

United States
- Name: USS Adroit (AM-82)
- Builder: Commercial Iron Works, Portland, Oregon
- Laid down: 31 July 1941
- Launched: 21 February 1942
- Commissioned: 28 July 1942
- Renamed: USS PC-1586, 1 June 1944
- Decommissioned: 14 December 1945
- Stricken: 8 January 1946
- Honors and awards: 1 battle star for World War II
- Fate: Transferred to the Maritime Commission for disposal, 18 March 1948

General characteristics
- Class & type: Adroit-class minesweeper
- Displacement: 295 long tons (300 t)
- Length: 173 ft 8 in (52.93 m)
- Beam: 23 ft (7.0 m)
- Draft: 6 ft 6 in (1.98 m)
- Propulsion: 2 × 1,770 bhp Cooper Bessemer GNB8 diesel engines
- Speed: 16 knots (30 km/h)
- Complement: 65
- Armament: 1 × 3"/50 caliber gun; 1 x 40 mm gun

USS Adroit (AM-82/PC-1586) was an Adroit-class minesweeper acquired by the United States Navy for the task of removing mines that had been placed in the water to prevent the safe passage of ships.

Adroit was laid down on 31 July 1941 at Portland, Oregon, by the Commercial Iron Works; launched on 21 February 1942; and placed in commission on 28 July 1942.

== Pacific Ocean operations ==
Following her commissioning, the minesweeper moved to San Francisco, for final fitting out and shakedown training. She left the west coast on 23 November and shaped a course for Hawaii. Adroit reached Pearl Harbor on 6 December and spent two weeks undergoing voyage repairs. She set sail on the 21st for Nouméa, New Caledonia. Upon her arrival there, the ship began operations with Destroyer Squadron 12 on antisubmarine patrols off Nouméa.

== Guadalcanal operations ==
In mid-April, Adroit sailed to Espiritu Santo to undergo repairs. This work was completed in June, and she got underway on the 18th with a convoy for Guadalcanal. On 2 July, the minesweeper headed back to Nouméa and operated there until the 26th, escorting ships entering and leaving the harbor.

On the last day of July, Adroit arrived back at Guadalcanal and assumed station on a patrol screen. Her sound gear broke on 2 August, forcing her to anchor off Lunga Point until repairs could be made. The minesweeper got underway again on the 22nd, headed for New Caledonia, made intermediate stops at Espiritu Santo and Efate, and reached Nouméa on 10 September. She then resumed harbor escort duties.

In mid-October, Adroit sailed to Guadalcanal to join forces scheduled to invade the Treasury Islands. The vessel arrived off Bougainville on 26 October and began her prelanding sweeps. The assault began on the 27th and, during November, she escorted three more convoys from Guadalcanal to support the assault on the Treasury Islands.

Adroit began operations from Guadalcanal on 23 November as a "ready ship" on screening and convoy duty and on hunter-killer operations. In this role, she escorted convoys to Espiritu Santo and Efate, New Hebrides; Nouméa, New Caledonia; Auckland, New Zealand; Tarawa, Gilbert Islands; and Manus, Admiralty Islands.

== Reclassified as a submarine chaser ==
On 1 June 1944, the ship was reclassified as a submarine chaser and redesignated PC-1586 and her name, Adroit, was cancelled. In mid-December, she moved to Ulithi where she served as a harbor patrol vessel. On 28 March 1945, she left Ulithi and proceeded to Saipan, where she arrived four days later. During the rest of her wartime service, PC-1586 operated on escort duty between Saipan and Iwo Jima. She made three round-trip voyages between these islands before shaping a course for Pearl Harbor on 30 July.

== End-of-War deactivation ==
PC-1586 reached Hawaiian waters on 15 August and remained in port for approximately two weeks before sailing on to the west coast. She touched at San Francisco, on 15 September and began preparing for deactivation. PC-1586 was decommissioned on 14 December 1945, and her name was struck from the Navy list on 8 January 1946. She was transferred to the Maritime Commission on 18 March 1948 for disposal.

== Awards ==
Adroit earned one battle star for her World War II service.
