= USS Direct (AM-90) =

Minesweeper of the United States Navy

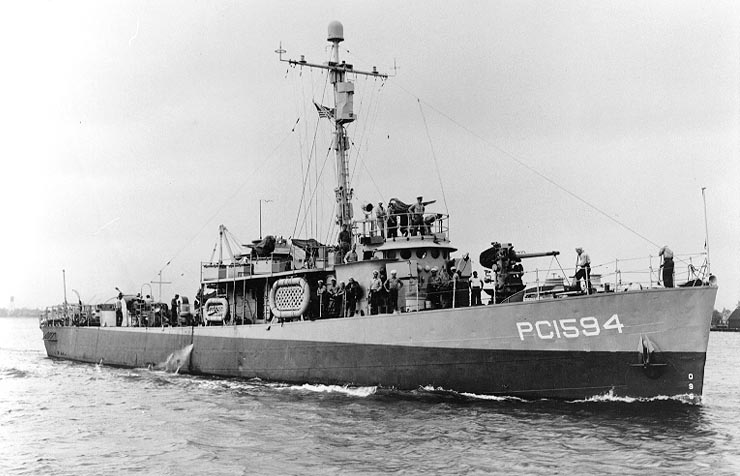
- USS PC-1594 Off the Norfolk Navy Yard, Virginia, on 4 June 1944. She was formerly USS Direct (AM-90).

History

United States
- Name: USS Direct
- Builder: Dravo Corporation, Pittsburgh, Pennsylvania
- Laid down: 26 December 1941
- Launched: 25 April 1942
- Sponsored by: Miss Dana E. Erwin
- Commissioned: 31 August 1942
- Renamed: USS PC-1594, 1 June 1944
- Decommissioned: 9 November 1945
- Honors and awards: 1 battle star (World War II)
- Fate: Transferred to the Maritime Commission, 29 July 1946
- Notes: Pennant = AM-90

General characteristics
- Class & type: Adroit-class minesweeper
- Displacement: 295 long tons (300 t)
- Length: 173 ft 8 in (52.93 m)
- Beam: 23 ft (7.0 m)
- Draft: 6 ft 6 in (1.98 m)
- Propulsion: 2 × 1,770 bhp (1,320 kW) Cooper Bessemer GNB-8 diesel engines
- Speed: 16 knots (30 km/h)
- Complement: 65
- Armament: 1 × 3"/50 caliber gun; 1 × 40 mm gun

USS Direct (AM-90) was an Adroit-class minesweeper of the United States Navy. It was laid down on 26 December 1941 by the Dravo Corporation, Neville Island, Pittsburgh, Pennsylvania, launched on 25 April 1942, and commissioned on 31 August 1942. The ship started conversion to a submarine chaser on 16 May 1944 at Norfolk, Virginia, and was reclassified PC-1594 on 1 June 1944.

== World War II Atlantic Ocean Operations ==
The Direct arrived at Bermuda on 30 December 1942 for anti-submarine patrol and escort duty until arriving at New York on 24 April 1944. On 15 May she began conversion to a submarine chaser patrol vessel at Norfolk, Virginia, and on 1 June 1944 her name was canceled and she was reclassified PC-1594.

== Submarine chaser PC-1594 ==
The PC-1594 sailed from Norfolk, Virginia on 13 June 1944 for training off Bermuda. On 6 July she rendezvoused with a convoy bound for Bizerte, Tunisia, arriving on the 23rd. A week later she departed for Naples, arriving 2 August for anti-submarine patrol and escort duty. She took part in the invasion of southern France on 15 August and continued to serve on convoy and patrol duty in the Mediterranean from Palermo, Bizerte, and Oran until 27 May 1945 when she sailed for the United States.

== Awards ==
PC-1594 received one battle star for the invasion of southern France.

== Post-war decommissioning ==
She arrived at Jacksonville, Florida on 15 June. She was decommissioned on 9 November 1945, and transferred to the Maritime Administration for disposal on 29 July 1946.

It was than registered in 1946 by the Mechanical Equipment Co. and in 1947 by Harry F. Allsman Co. as the Allmac. All assets of that company were taken over by J. Ray McDermott in 1948. In 1950 the vessel was scrapped.
