= USS Despite =

Adroit-class minesweeper of the United States Navy

History

United States
- Name: USS Despite
- Builder: Dravo Corporation, Neville Island, Pittsburgh, Pennsylvania
- Laid down: 24 November 1941
- Launched: 28 March 1942
- Commissioned: 31 August 1942
- Renamed: USS PC-1593, 1 June 1944
- Decommissioned: 17 December 1945
- Honors and awards: 1 battle star (World War II)
- Fate: Transferred to the Maritime Commission, 16 September 1946

General characteristics
- Class & type: Adroit-class minesweeper
- Displacement: 295 long tons (300 t)
- Length: 173 ft 8 in (52.93 m)
- Beam: 23 ft (7.0 m)
- Draft: 11 ft 7 in (3.53 m)
- Propulsion: 2 × 1,770 bhp (1,320 kW) Cooper Bessemer GNB-8 diesel engines (Serial No. 1965 & 1966); 2 shafts
- Speed: 17 knots (31 km/h)
- Complement: 65
- Armament: 1 × 3"/50 caliber gun; 1 × 40 mm gun

USS Despite (AM-89) was an Adroit-class minesweeper of the United States Navy. Laid down on 24 November 1941 by the Dravo Corporation, Neville Island, Pittsburgh, Pennsylvania, launched on 28 March 1942, and commissioned on 31 August 1942. The ship was reclassified as a submarine chaser PC-1593 on 1 June 1944.

== World War II North Atlantic Operations ==
Despite arrived at Port Royal Bay, Bermuda, on 28 December 1942 for duty on patrol and in submarine exercises off Bermuda. She also escorted convoys to New York, Norfolk, Key West and Jacksonville.

On 24 April 1944 Despite arrived at New York, and on 15 May 1944 at Norfolk, Virginia. Her name was canceled and her classification changed to PC-1593 on 1 June.

== Converted to submarine chaser ==
She departed Norfolk, Virginia on 13 June for the Mediterranean, arriving as escort for a convoy at Bizerte, Tunisia on 23 July. On the last day of the month she got underway for Salerno, arriving on 4 August after delivering a convoy to Naples en route. She joined the Delta Task Force for the invasion of southern France 15 August to 26 August, screening ships in convoy, acting as reference and liaison vessel, and providing local escort services.

PC-1593 remained in the Mediterranean on a variety of duties. She performed patrol duty off Palermo and the northern coast of Italy; escorted convoys between Palermo, Livorno, Toulon, and Marseille; acted as harbor entrance control and liaison ship at Toulon; conducted training exercises with Italian submarines at Palermo; and engaged in maneuvers and landing exercises off Bizerte. PC-1593 sailed from Oran on 27 May 1945 for Charleston, South Carolina, arriving 13 June.

== Post-war deactivation ==
PC-1593 was decommissioned on 17 December 1945 at Jacksonville, Florida; transferred to the Maritime Commission for disposal on 16 September 1946, and sold to the Cornelius Kroll Co., Houston, Texas. Named M/V Mustang from 1948 to 1950. Fate unknown.

== Awards ==
PC-1593 received one battle star for World War II service.
