= Dolmen of Briande =

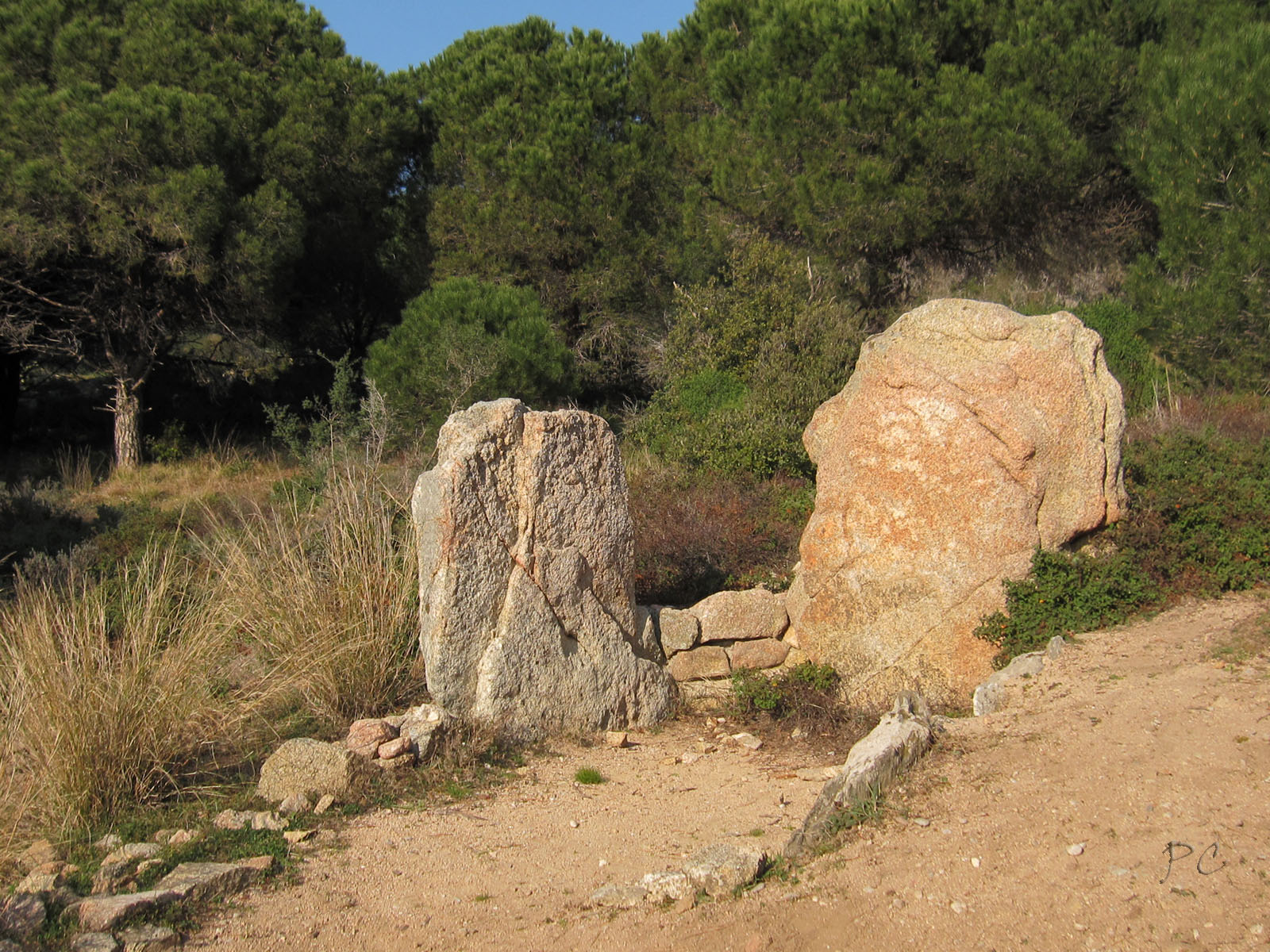
Dolmen located near Cap Taillat (Ramatuelle)

The Dolmen de la Briande is a dolmen located in Ramatuelle in the Var department of France.

The dolmen was built on a hillside, 300 meters from the sea, and is the southernmost dolmen in the entire department. Although very damaged, the general architecture of the building is recognizable. The burial chamber is rectangular in shape. It is delimited by a chevet slab and an orthostat on the east side, both made of granite of local origin. The other slabs are made of gneiss, erected on edge and joined by dry stone walls. The floor was paved with small pebbles of marine origin. No corridor or door separating the chamber from a possible corridor is visible, but they may have been destroyed.

The building was restored by Hélène Barge and Eric Mahieu.

According to Oscar Rappaz, who excavated the building in 1935, the chamber contained two or three small chests in its southern part, delimited by slabs of schist. In the northern part, the funerary material was piled up against the chevet slab. The excavations yielded flint lanceolate arrowheads and some items of adornment (hyaline quartz pendants, serpentine disc-shaped beads).
