= USS Dash (AM-88) =

Minesweeper of the United States Navy

History

United States
- Name: USS Dash
- Builder: Commercial Iron Works, Portland, Oregon
- Laid down: 6 April 1942
- Launched: 20 June 1942
- Commissioned: 27 October 1942
- Renamed: USS PC-1592, 1 June 1944
- Decommissioned: 10 May 1946
- Fate: Transferred to the War Assets Administration, 19 December 1947

General characteristics
- Class & type: Adroit-class minesweeper
- Displacement: 295 long tons (300 t)
- Length: 173 ft 8 in (52.93 m)
- Beam: 23 ft (7.0 m)
- Draft: 11 ft 7 in (3.53 m)
- Propulsion: 2 × 1,770 bhp (1,320 kW) Cooper Bessemer GNB-8 diesel engines; Farrel-Birmingham single reduction gear; 2 shafts
- Speed: 17 knots (31 km/h)
- Complement: 65
- Armament: 1 × 3"/50 caliber gun; 1 × 40 mm gun

The first USS Dash (AM-88) was an Adroit class minesweeper of the United States Navy.

The ship was laid down on 6 April 1942 by the Commercial Iron Works of Portland, Oregon, launched on 20 June 1942, and commissioned on 27 October 1942. Dash was reclassified as the submarine chaser PC-1592 on 1 June 1944, and decommissioned on 10 May 1946 at Pearl Harbor, Hawaii. The ship was transferred to the War Assets Administration for disposal on 19 December 1947. Fate unknown.

== World War II Pacific Theatre operations ==
Putting to sea from San Pedro, California on 3 January 1943 Dash arrived at Noumea on 25 February, escorting convoys to Pearl Harbor and Pago Pago, Samoa, en route. She operated out of Nouméa on local escort duty and anti-submarine patrol until 9 April when she steamed to Suva, Fiji Islands, to relieve HMS Viti as local escort and patrol vessel.

== Rescue activities ==
From 3 to 7 May she escorted the torpedoed SS William Williams to the safety of Suva. On 14 May she rescued 25 men including the commanding officer from the torpedoed SS Phoebe Hearst, and three days later picked up 56 men from the SS William K. Vanderbilt.

== Inter-Island operations ==
Dash escorted a convoy to Guadalcanal between 26 July and 16 August 1943, then began steady duty between Noumea, Efate, and Espiritu Santo. Returning to Guadalcanal on 4 October she swept mines off Kolombangara Island from 23 October to 6 November, then returned to escort duty between the Solomons and Nouméa and Espiritu Santo. Aside from a voyage to Auckland, New Zealand between 16 January and 1 February 1944 escorting Delphinus (AF-24), Dash alternated escort duty and patrol in the Solomons, New Hebrides, and New Caledonia until the end of the war. She was reclassified as the submarine chaser PC-1592 on 1 June 1944.

== As a submarine chaser ==
PC-1592 remained in the South Pacific, operating in the Fiji Islands and Samoa until her return to Pearl Harbor.

== Post-War deactivation ==
She was decommissioned there 10 May 1946, and transferred to the War Assets Administration for disposal 19 December 1947.
