= USS Engage (AM-93) =

Minesweeper of the United States Navy

History

United States
- Name: USS Engage (AM-93)
- Builder: Dravo Corporation, Neville Island, Pittsburgh, Pennsylvania
- Laid down: 26 February 1942
- Launched: 11 July 1942
- Commissioned: 22 October 1942
- Renamed: USS PC-1597, 1 June 1944
- Decommissioned: 19 November 1945
- Honors and awards: 1 battle star (World War II)
- Fate: Transferred to the Dominican Republic, 1946

History

Dominican Republic
- Name: Cibao (P103)
- Acquired: 1946
- Renamed: Constitución (P203)
- Decommissioned: 1961
- Fate: unknown

General characteristics
- Class & type: Adroit-class minesweeper
- Displacement: 295 long tons (300 t)
- Length: 173 ft 8 in (52.93 m)
- Beam: 23 ft (7.0 m)
- Draft: 7 ft 7 in (2.31 m)
- Propulsion: 2 × 1,770 bhp (1,320 kW) Cooper Bessemer GNB-8 diesel engines (Serial No. 1977 & 1980); Farrel-Birmingham single reduction gear; 2 shafts
- Speed: 16 knots (30 km/h)
- Complement: 65
- Armament: 1 × 3"/50 caliber gun; 1 × 40 mm gun

USS Engage (AM-93) was an Adroit-class minesweeper of the United States Navy. Laid down on 26 February 1942 by the Dravo Corporation, Neville Island, Pittsburgh, Pennsylvania, launched on 11 July 1942, and commissioned on 22 October 1942. The ship was reclassified as a submarine chaser, PC-1597 on 1 June 1944.

== World War II east coast operations ==
Engage arrived at Charleston, South Carolina, on 12 December 1942 from her shakedown off Florida, and cruised again to Florida ports the next month on coastal escort duty. She arrived at Norfolk, Virginia, on 4 February 1943 for operations in Chesapeake Bay until 10 March, when she sailed on escort duty to Bermuda. Here she served on escort and patrol duty, as well as training with submarines, occasionally leaving the area to escort ships to Norfolk.

== Operating as a submarine chaser ==
On 4 July 1944, PC-1597 sailed in convoy from Norfolk, Virginia, for Bizerte, Tunisia, arriving 23 July. She moved on to Naples, Italy, and Ajaccio, Corsica, from which she cleared 13 August for the invasion of southern France. During the initial assault, she acted as reference vessel for the waves of landing craft bringing the troops ashore, then patrolled off the transport area. Through the next month, she supported the buildup in southern France by escorting convoys to the beachheads, and patrolling along the Riviera. At the close of September, she began general escort duty in the western Mediterranean until 27 May 1945 when she sailed for Jacksonville, Florida.

== Post-war deactivation ==
She was decommissioned on 19 November 1945 at Jacksonville, Florida, and transferred to the Maritime Commission on 8 November 1946. Transferred to the Dominican Republic in 1946 as Cibao (P103), renamed and reclassified Constitución (P203), and placed out of service in 1961. Fate unknown.

PC-1597 received one battle star for World War II service.
