= Adroit-class minesweeper =

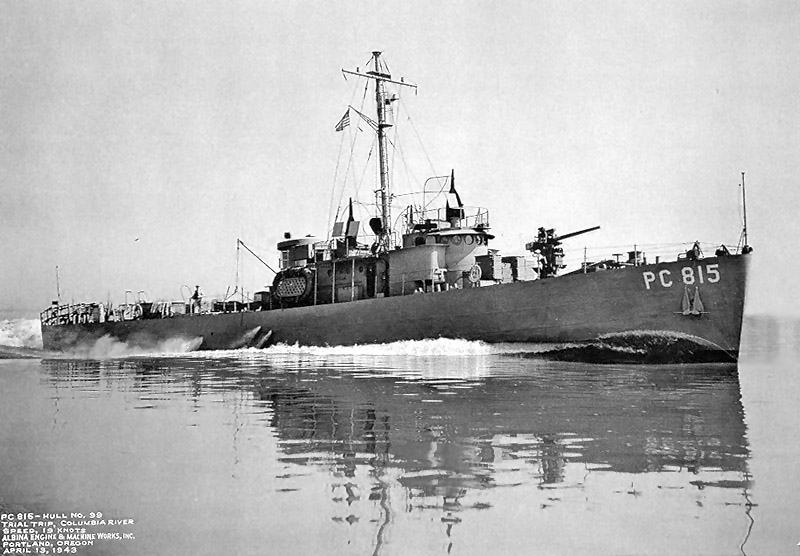
- A PC-461-class submarine chaser

Class overview
- Built: 1941–1942
- In commission: 1941–1946
- Completed: 18

General characteristics
- Displacement: 295 tons
- Length: 173 ft 8 in (52.93 m)
- Beam: 23 ft (7.0 m)
- Draft: 6 ft 6 in (1.98 m)
- Propulsion: 2 × 1,770 bhp (1,320 kW) Cooper Bessemer GNB8 diesel engines; or; 2 × 1,440 bhp (1,070 kW) Busch-Sulzer BS 539 diesel engines; 2 shafts
- Speed: 16 knots (30 km/h)
- Complement: 65
- Armament: 1 × 3"/50 caliber gun; 1 × Bofors 40 mm L/60 gun

The Adroit-class minesweepers were a class of United States Navy PC-461-class submarine chasers completed as minesweepers. However, they were considered unsatisfactory in this role, and were all eventually converted back into submarine chasers.

== Adroit-class minesweepers ==
- USS Adroit (AM-82). Reclassified PC-1586.
- USS Advent (AM-83). Reclassified PC-1587.
- USS Annoy (AM-84). Reclassified PC-1588.
- USS Conflict (AM-85). Reclassified PC-1589.
- USS Constant (AM-86). Reclassified PC-1590.
- USS Daring (AM-87). Reclassified PC-1591.
- USS Dash (AM-88). Reclassified PC-1592.
- USS Despite (AM-89). Reclassified PC-1593.
- USS Direct (AM-90). Reclassified PC-1594.
- USS Dynamic (AM-91). Reclassified PC-1595.
- USS Effective (AM-92). Reclassified PC-1596.
- USS Engage (AM-93). Reclassified PC-1597.
- USS Excel (AM-94). Reclassified PC-1598.
- USS Exploit (AM-95). Reclassified PC-1599.
- USS Fidelity (AM-96). Reclassified PC-1600.
- USS Fierce (AM-97). Reclassified PC-1601.
- USS Firm (AM-98). Reclassified PC-1602.
- USS Force (AM-99). Reclassified PC-1603.

== See also ==
- List of patrol vessels of the United States Navy
