= Commercial Iron Works =

Manufacturing firm in Portland, Oregon, U.S.

Coordinates: 45°29′59″N 122°40′03″W

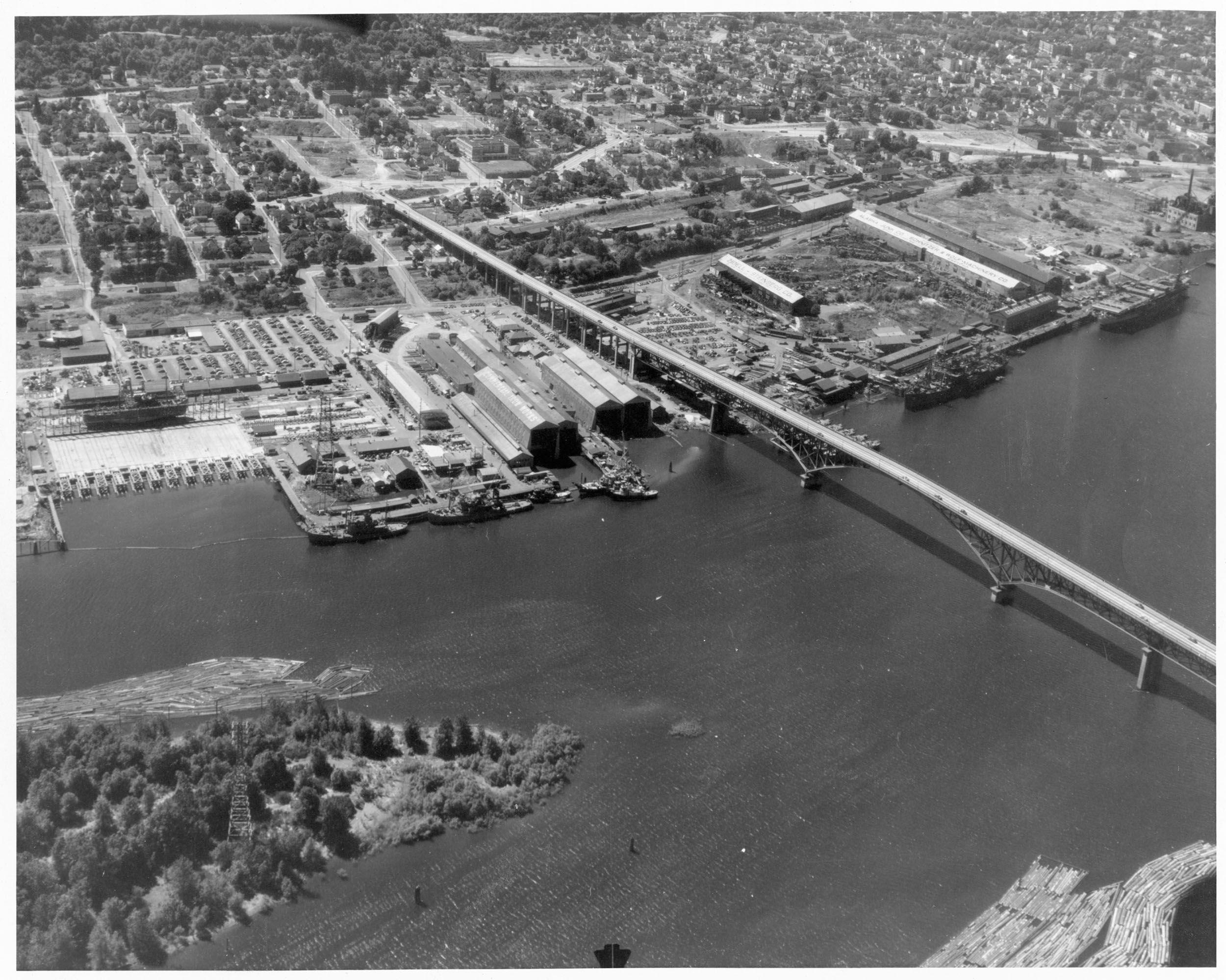
- Commercial Iron Works in 1945
- Industry: Manufacturing & shipbuilding
- Founded: 1916
- Founder: William T. Casey, Otto J. Hoak and Robert Boogs
- Defunct: 1946
- Headquarters: Portland, Oregon, U.S.
- Products: Small warships, iron and steel products

Commercial Iron Works was a manufacturing firm in Portland, Oregon, United States. Established in 1916, the company is best remembered today for its contribution to America's Emergency Shipbuilding Program during World War II.

== History ==
The company was founded in November 1916, by William T. Casey, Otto J. Hoak and Robert Boogs, on a 30-acre (120,000 m^{2}) site on the Willamette River just south of the Ross Island Bridge. Little is known about the company's early years, but it appears to have served diverse markets. For example, it placed a bid for the manufacture of 200 fire hydrants for the City of Portland in 1927, and supplied the high pressure outlet gates for the Unity Dam on the Burnt River near Baker, Oregon in 1937. The company is recorded as having built only one ship prior to World War II – a small 140-ton tender for the US Coast Guard in 1935. The CIW built the 25-ton tugboat Constance J for the Crown Willamette Paper Company. The Constance J was still in service as an active workboat as late as 2017 under the name Diane.

Commercial Iron Works established a shipyard on the Ross Island site in the early 1940s, which turned out close to 200 small warships during the war, including net layers, minelayers, submarine chasers, and LCI and LCS landing craft. It also outfitted larger ships built at other yards with armaments.

Following the war, the shipyard was acquired in 1946 by another local firm, the Zidell Machinery and Supply Company, which was eventually to transform the yard into America's largest shipbreaking operation.

== World War II ships ==
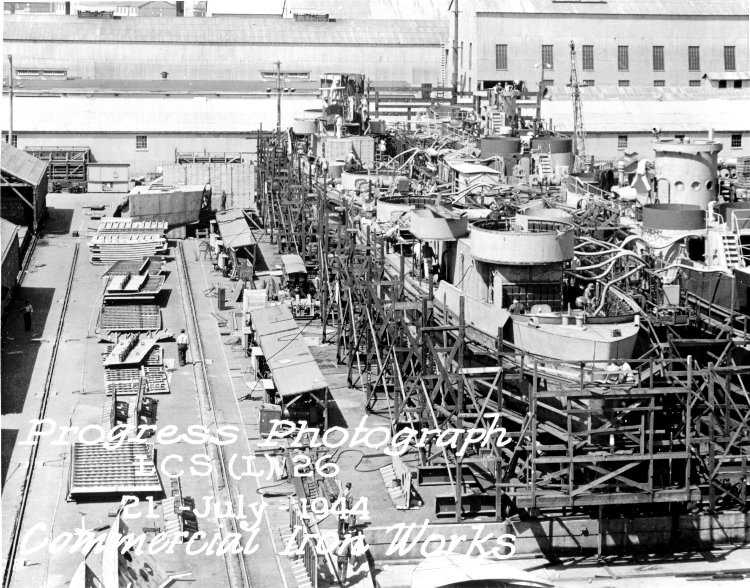
LCS (Landing Craft Support) under construction at Commercial Iron Works in 1944

- 4 of 29 Cherokee-class fleet tugs
  - Tawasa (AT-92) ... Zuni (AT-95)
- 43 of 343 PC-461-class submarine chasers
- 7 of 18 Adroit-class minesweepers
    - Adroit (AM-82) ... Dash (AM-88)
- 56 of M Landing Craft Infantry
  - LCI(L)-725 ... LCI(L)-780
- 4 of 32 Aloe-class net laying ships
  - Catalpa (AN-10) ... Buckeye (AN-13)
- 6 of 15 Cohoes-class net laying ships
  - Cohoes (AN-78) ... Nahant (AN-83)
- 52 of 130 Landing Craft Support
  - LCS-26 ... LCS-47, LCS-79 ... LCS-108
- tugs YTM-769 ... YTM-780
- completion of
  - AP-92, AP-93, AP-96 (Western Pipe and Steel Company hulls)
  - AK-156, AK-158, AP-133 (Kaiser No. 4 hulls)
  - 3 of 45 Bogue-class escort carriers (Todd Tacoma hulls)
    - Bastian (CVE-37) (HMS Trumpeter)
    - Perdido (CVE-47) (HMS Trouncer)
    - St. Simon (CVE-51) (HMS Arbiter)
  - 3 of 19 Commencement Bay-class escort carriers (Todd Tacoma hulls)
    - Salerno Bay (CVE-110)
    - Badoeng Strait (CVE-116)
    - Rabaul (CVE-121)
