= List of United States Navy ships: G–H =

Ships of the United States Navy

Ships in current service
- Current ships

Ships grouped alphabetically
- A–B; C; D–F; G–H; I–K; L; M; N–O; P; Q–R; S; T–V; W–Z

Ships grouped by type
- Aircraft carriers; Airships; Amphibious warfare ships; Auxiliaries; Battlecruisers; Battleships; Cruisers; Destroyers; Destroyer escorts; Destroyer leaders; Escort carriers; Frigates; Hospital ships; Littoral combat ships; Mine warfare vessels; Monitors; Oilers; Patrol vessels; Registered civilian vessels; Sailing frigates; Steam frigates; Steam gunboats; Ships of the line; Sloops of war; Submarines; Torpedo boats; Torpedo retrievers; Unclassified miscellaneous; Yard and district craft

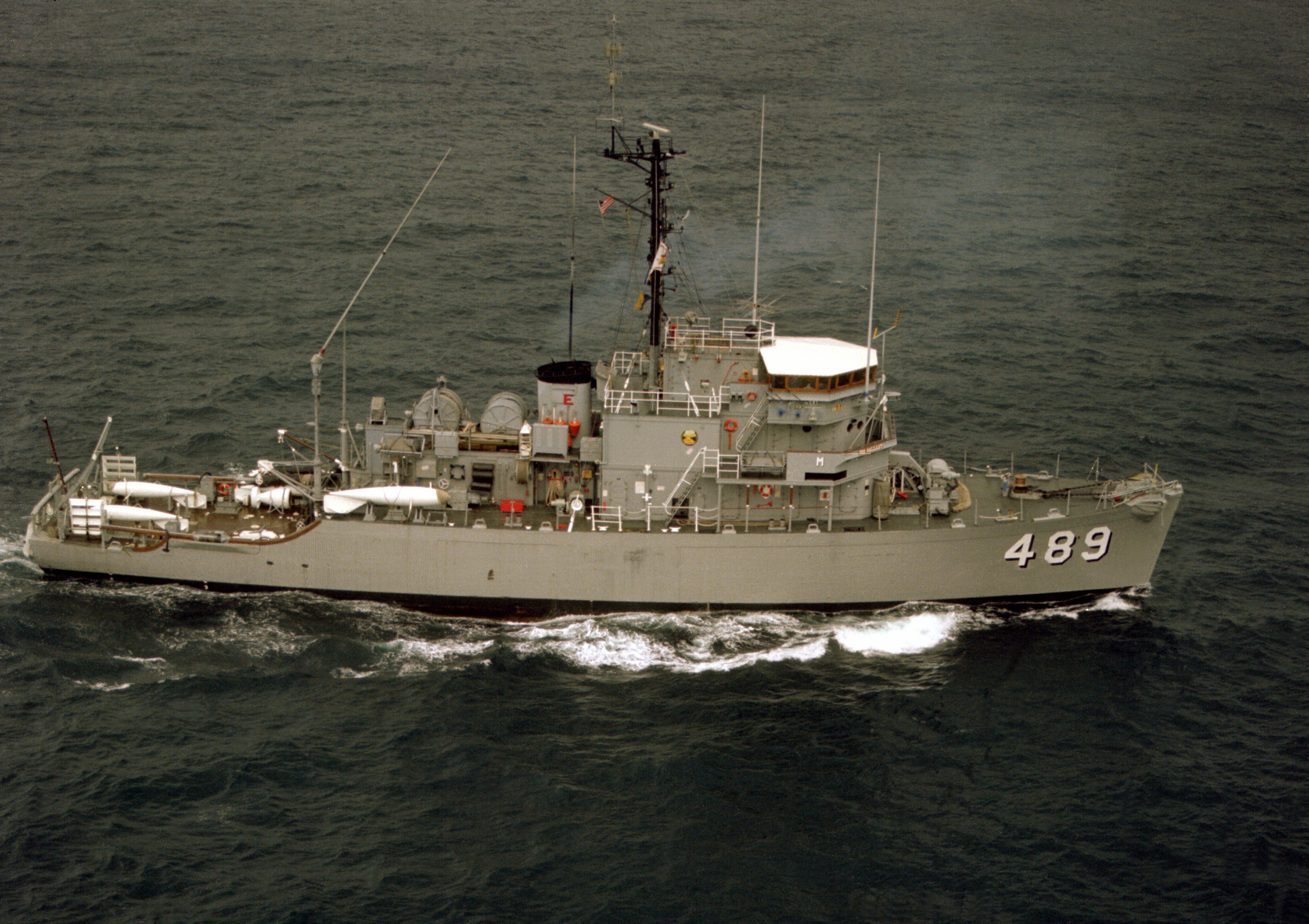
USS Gallant (MSO-489)

This section of the list of United States Navy ships contains all ships of the United States Navy with names beginning with G and H.

For a list exclusively of currently commissioned ships, see the List of current ships of the United States Navy.

For ships with unique names, "USS Ship‍name" redirects to the ship article. For reused names, "USS Ship‍name" is an index page for the ships of that name; the links after the name lead to the specific ship pages.

== G ==
- USS G-1 (SS-19½)
- USS G-2 (SS-27)
- USS G-3 (SS-31)
- USS G-4 (SS-26)
- USS G. H. McNeal (SP-312)
- USS G. L. Brockenborough (1862)
- USS G. W. Blunt (1856)

=== Ga ===
- USS Gabilan (SS-252)
- USS Gabrielle Giffords (LCS-10)
- USS Gadsden (AK-182)
- USS Gadwall (AM-362/MSF-362)
- USS Gage (APA-168)
- USS Gainard (DD-706)
- USS Gaivota (SP-436)
- USS Galatea (1863, SP-714)
- USS Galaxy (IX-54) (IX-54)
- USS Galena (1862, 1880, PC-1136)
- USS Galilea (AKN-6)
- USS Gallant (PYc-29, AM-489/MSO-489)
- USS Gallatin (1807, APA-169/LPA-169)
- USS Gallery (FFG-26)
- USS Gallagher (DDG-127)
- USS Gallinipper (1823)
- USS Gallipolis (PC-778)
- USS Gallup (PG-155/PF-47, PGM-85/PG-85)
- USS Galveston (C-17/PG-31/CL-19, CL-93/CLG-3)
- USS Galvez (FFG-67)
- USS Gamage (1864, IX-227)
- USS Gambier Bay (AVG-73/ACV-73/CVE-73)
- USS Gamble (DD-123/DM-15)
- USS Gamma (1863)
- USS Ganadoga (YT-390/YTB-390/YTM-390)
- USS Gandy (DE-764)
- USS Ganges (1794)
- USS Gannet (AM-41/AVP-8, AMS-290/MSC-290)
- USS Gansevoort (DD-608)
- USS Gantner (DE-60/APD-42)
- USS Ganymede (AK-104)
- USS Gar (SS-206)
- USS Garcia (DE-1040/FF-1040)
- USS Gardenia (1879)
- USS Gardiner (DE-274)
- USS Gardiners Bay (AVP-39)
- USS Gardoqui (1898, IX-218)
- USS Garfield County (LST-784)
- USS Garfield Thomas (DE-193)
- USS Garfish (SS-30)
- USS Gargoyle (1903)
- USS Garland (1815, AM-238/MSF-238)
- USS Garlies (DE-271)
- USS Garlopa (SS-358)
- USS Garnet (PYc-15)
- USS Garonne (1861)
- USS Garrard (APA-84)
- USS Garrett County (LST-786/AGP-786)
- USS Garrupa (SS-359)
- USS Gary (DE-326, CL-147, FFG-51)
- USS Gasconade (APA-85)
- USS Gatch (DE-1026)
- USS Gates (1776)
- USS Gatling (DD-671)
- USS Gato (SS-212, SSN-615)
- USS Gauger (YO-55)
- USS Gavia (AM-363)
- USS Gayety (AM-239/MSF-239)
- USS Gaynier (DE-751)
- USS Gazelle (1863, BAM-17, IX-116)

=== Gea–Gen ===
- USS Gear (ARS-34)
- USS Gearing (DD-710)
- USNS Geiger (T-AP-197)
- USS Gem (SP-41)
- USS Gem of the Sea (1861)
- SS Gem State (T-ACS-2)
- USS Gemini (AP-75, PHM-6)
- USS Gemsbok (1861, IX-117)
- USS Gendreau (DE-639)
- USS General A. E. Anderson (AP-111/T-AP-111)
- USS General A. W. Brewster (AP-155/T-AP-155)
- USS General A. W. Greely (AP-141/T-AP-141)
- USS General Alava (AG-5)
- USNS General Alexander M. Patch (T-AP-122)
- USS General Arnold (1776)
- USS General Bragg (1851)
- USS General Burnside (1862)
- USS General C. C. Ballou (AP-157/T-AP-157)
- USS General C. G. Morton (AP-138/T-AP-138)
- USS General C. H. Barth (AP-119)
- USS General C. H. Muir (AP-142/T-AP-142)
- USS General D. E. Aultman (AP-156/T-AP-156)
- USNS General Daniel I. Sultan (T-AP-120)
- USS General E. T. Collins (AP-147/T-AP-147)
- USNS General Edwin D. Patrick (T-AP-124)
- USS General G. O. Squier (AP-130)
- USS General G. W. Goethals (ID-1443)
- USS General Gates (1764)
- USS General George M. Randall (AP-115/T-AP-115)
- USS General Grant (1863)
- USS General Greene (1797, 1799)
- USS General H. B. Freeman (AP-143/T-AP-143)
- USS General H. F. Hodges (AP-144/T-AP-144)
- USS General H. H. Arnold (T-AGM-9)
- USS General H. L. Scott (AP-136)
- USS General H. W. Butner (AP-113/T-AP-113)
- USS General Harry Taylor (AP-145/T-AP-145)
- USS General Hoyt S. Vandenberg (T-AGM-10)
- USNS General Hugh J. Gaffey (T-AP-121/IX-507)
- USS General J. C. Breckinridge (AP-176/T-AP-176)
- USS General J. H. McRae (AP-149/T-AP-149)
- USS General J. R. Brooke (AP-132)
- USS General John Pope (AP-110/T-AP-110)
- USS General Knox (SP-1237)
- USS General LeRoy Eltinge (AP-154/T-AP-154)
- USS General Lyon (1860)
- USS General M. B. Stewart (AP-140/T-AP-140)
- USS General M. C. Meigs (AP-116/T-AP-116)
- USS General M. L. Hersey (AP-148/T-AP-148)
- USS General M. M. Patrick (AP-150/T-AP-150)
- USNS General Maurice Rose (T-AP-126)
- USS General Mifflin (1776)
- USNS General Nelson M. Walker (T-AP-125)
- USS General O. H. Ernst (AP-133)
- USS General Omar Bundy (AP-152)
- USS General Pike (1813)
- USS General Pillow (1862)
- USS General Price (1856)
- USS General Putnam (1857, SP-2284)
- USS General R. E. Callan (AP-139/T-AP-139)
- USS General R. L. Howze (AP-134/T-AP-134)
- USS General R. M. Blatchford (AP-118, AP-153/T-AP-153)
- USS General S. D. Sturgis (AP-137/T-AP-137)
- USS General Schuyler (1776)
- USS General Sherman (1864)
- USNS General Simon B. Buckner (T-AP-123)
- USS General Stuart Heintzelman (AP-159/T-AP-159)
- USS General T. H. Bliss (AP-131)
- USS General Taylor (1840)
- USS General Thomas (1864)
- USS General W. A. Mann (AP-112/T-AP-112)
- USS General W. C. Gorgas (ID-1365)
- USS General W. C. Langfitt (AP-151/T-AP-151)
- USS General W. F. Hase (AP-146/T-AP-146)
- USS General W. G. Haan (AP-158/T-AP-158)
- USS General W. H. Gordon (AP-117/T-AP-117)
- USS General W. M. Black (AP-135/T-AP-135)
- USS General W. P. Richardson (AP-118)
- USS General Washington (1780)
- USS General William Mitchell (AP-114/T-AP-114)
- USNS General William O. Darby (AP-127/T-AP-127)
- USS General William Weigel (AP-119/T-AP-119)
- USS Genesee (1862, AT-55, AOG-8)
- USS Geneva (APA-86)
- USS Genevieve (SP-459)
- USS Gentry (DE-349)

=== Geo–Get ===
- USS Geoanna (IX-61)
- USS George (DE-276, DE-697)
- USS George A. Johnson (DE-583)
- USS George Bancroft (SSBN-643)
- USS George Burton (1919)
- USS George C. Henry (ID-1560)
- USS George C. Marshall (SSBN-654)
- USS George Chaffey (YAG-48)
- USS George Chamberlain (YAG-47)
- USS George Clarke (1919)
- USS George Clymer (AP-57/APA-27)
- USS George Cochrane (1919)
- USS George E. Badger (DD-196/AVP-16/AVD-3/APD-33)
- USS George E. Davis (DE-357)
- USS George Eastman (YAG-39)
- USS George F. Elliott (AP-13, AP-105)
- USS George F. Pierce (SP-648)
- USS George G. Henry (ID-1560)
- USS George H. Bradley (SP-327)
- USS George H.W. Bush (CVN-77)
- USS George K. MacKenzie (DD-836)
- USS George M. Bibb (1845, WPG-31)
- USS George M. Campbell (DE-773)
- USS George M. Neal (DDG-131)
- USS George Mangham (1854)
- USS George P. Squires (SP-303)
- USS George P. Upshur (1861)
- USS George Philip (FFG-12)
- USS George W. Bush (CVN-83)
- USNS George W. Goethals (T-AP-182)
- USS George W. Ingram (DE-62/APD-43)
- USS George W. Rodgers (1861)
- USS George Washington (1798, ID-3018, SSBN-598/SSN-598, CVN-73)
- USS George Washington Carver (SSBN-656/SSN-656)
- USS George Washington Parke Custis (1861)
- USS Georgetown (AG-165/AGTR-2)
- USS Georgia (BB-15, SSBN-729/SSGN-729)
- USS Georgia Packet (1776)
- USS Georgiana (1813)
- USS Georgiana III (SP-83)
- USS Gerald R. Ford (CVN-78)
- USS Geraldine (SP-1011)
- USS Geranium (1863)
- USS Germ (1841)
- USS Germantown (1846, LSD-42)
- USS Geronimo (YTM-119, ATA-207)
- USS Gertrude (1863)
- USS Get There (SP-579)
- USS Gettysburg (1858, PCE-904, CG-64)

=== Gh–Gn ===
- USS Ghent (1815)
- USS Gherardi (DD-637/DMS-30)
- USS Giansar (AK-111)
- USS Gibson County (LST-794)
- USS Gila River (LSM(R)-504)
- USS Gilbert Islands (CVE-107/AKV-39)
- USS Gillespie (DD-609)
- USS Gillette (DE-270, DE-681)
- USS Gilliam (APA-57)
- USS Gilligan (DE-508)
- USNS Gilliland (T-AKR-298)
- USS Gillis (DD-260/AVD-12)
- USS Gilmer (DD-233/APD-11, PC-565)
- USS Gilmore (DE-18)
- USS Ginkgo (YN-65)
- USS Gipsey (1862)
- USS Giraffe (IX-118)
- USS Girasol (PY-27)
- USS Glacier (AF-4, AVG-33/ACV-33/CVE-33, AK-183, AGB-4/WAGB-4)
- USS Gladiator (1876, AM-319/MSF-319, MCM-11)
- USS Gladiola (SP-184)
- USS Gladiolus (1864)
- USS Gladwin (APA-106)
- USS Gladwyne (PF-62)
- USS Glance (1863)
- USS Glasgow (1863)
- USS Glaucus (1863)
- USS Gleaves (DD-423)
- USS Glen White (SP-2068)
- USS Glenard P. Lipscomb (SSN-685)
- USS Glendale (PF-36)
- USS Glendoveer (SP-292)
- USS Glennon (DD-620, DD-840)
- USS Glenolden (PC-782)
- USS Glenville (SP-2512)
- USS Glenwood (PC-1140)
- USS Glide (1862, 1863)
- USNS Glomar Explorer (T-AG-193)
- USS Gloria Dalton (IX-70)
- USS Gloucester (1891, PG-130/PF-22)
- USS Glover (AGER-158, AGER-163/AGDE-1/DE-1098/FF-1098/AGFF-1/T-AGFF-1)
- USS Glynn (APA-239/LPA-239)
- USS Gnat (1822)

=== Go ===
- USS Goff (DD-247)
- USS Gold Shell (ID-3021)
- USS Gold Star (AG-12/AK-12)
- USS Goldcrest (AM-78, AM-80, AMCU-24/MHC-24)
- USS Golden City (AP-169)
- USS Golden Eagle (T-AF-52)
- USCGC Golden Gate (WYT-94)
- USS Goldfinch (AM-77, AM-395, AMS-12/MSC(O)-12)
- USS Goldring (SS-360)
- USS Goldsborough (TB-20, DD-188/AVP-18/AVD-5/APD-32, DDG-20)
- USS Golet (SS-361)
- USS Goliah (SP-1494)
- USS Goliath (1869)
- USS Gonzalez (DDG-66)
- USS Goodhue (APA-107)
- USS Goodrich (DD-831/DDR-831)
- USS Goodwill (1917)
- USS Gopher (1871)
- SS Gopher State (T-ACS-4)
- USS Gordius (ARL-36)
- USNS Gordon (T-AKR-296)
- USS Gordonia (AF-43)
- USS Gorgon (1869, BAM-18)
- USS Gorgona (SP-2164)
- USS Gorontalo (SP-2682)
- USS Goshawk (AM-2, AM-42, AMc-4/AM-79/IX-195)
- USS Goshen (APA-108)
- USS Gosper (APA-170)
- USS Goss (DE-444)
- USS Gosselin (DE-710/APD-126)
- USS Gould Island (YFB-31)
- USS Governor (AMc-82)
- USS Governor Buckingham (1863)
- USS Governor Davie (1798)
- USS Governor Jay (1797)
- USS Governor R. M. McLane (SP-1328)
- USS Governor Russell (1898)
- USS Governor Tompkins (1812)
- USS Governor Williams (1798)

=== Gr ===
- USS Gracie S. (SP-919)
- USS Grackle (AM-73, AMS-13/MSC(O)-13, AM-396)
- USS Grady (DE-445)
- USS Graf Waldersee (ID-4040)
- USS Graffias (AF-29)
- USS Grafton (APA-109, PCS-1431/EPCS-1431)
- USS Graham (DD-192)
- USS Graham County (LST-1176/AGP-1176)
- USS Grainger (AK-184)
- USS Grampus (1821, 1863, SS-4, SP-1708, SS-207, SS-523)
- USS Grand Canyon (AD-28/AR-28)
- SS Grand Canyon State (T-ACS-3)
- USS Grand Forks (PG-119/PF-11)
- USS Grand Gulf (1863)
- USS Grand Island (PG-122/PF-14)
- USS Grand Rapids (PG-139/PF-31, PGM-98/PG-98)
- USS Grand River (LSM(R)-505)
- USS Granite (1862)
- USS Granite City (1863)
- USS Granite State (1864)
- USS Grant (1871)
- USS Grant County (LST-1174)
- USS Granville (APA-171)
- USS Granville S. Hall (YAG-40)
- USS Grapeshot (1877)
- USS Grapple (ARS-7, ARS-53/T-ARS-53)
- USS Grasp (ARS-24, ARS-51/T-ARS-51)
- USS Gratia (AKS-11)
- USS Gratitude (SP-3054)
- USS Gravely (DDG-107)
- USS Gray (DE-1054/FF-1054)
- USS Grayback (SS-208, SSG-574/APSS-574)
- USS Graylag (AM-364/MSF-364)
- USS Grayling (SS-18, SP-1259, SP-289, SS-209, SS-492, SSN-646)
- USS Grayson (DD-435)
- SS Green Harbour (AK-2064)
- USS Great Lakes (AD-30)
- USS Great Northern (ID-4569/AG-9)
- USS Great Sitkin (AE-17)
- USS Great Western (1857)
- USS Grebe (AM-43/AT-134)
- USS Grecian (BAM-19)
- USS Green Bay (PGM-101/PG-101, LPD-20)
- USS Green Dragon (SP-742)
- USS Green Island (YFB-32)
- SS Green Mountain State (T-ACS-9)
- SS Green Ridge (AK-9655)
- USS Green River (LSM(R)-506)
- SS Green Valley (AK-2049)
- SS Green Wave (AK-2050)
- USS Greenbrier River (LSM(R)-507)
- USS Greencastle (PC-1119)
- USS Greene (DD-266/AVD-13/APD-36)
- USS Greeneville (SSN-772)
- USS Greenfish (SS-351)
- USS Greenlet (ASR-10)
- USS Greenling (SS-213, SSN-614)
- USS Greensboro (PF-101)
- USNS Greenville Victory (T-AK-237)
- USS Greenwich (1813)
- USS Greenwich Bay (AVP-41)
- USS Greenwood (DE-679)
- USS Greer (DD-145)
- USS Greer County (LST-799)
- USS Gregory (DD-82/APD-3, DD-802)
- USS Greiner (DE-37)
- USS Grenadier (SS-210, SS-525)
- USCGC Gresham (1896, WAVP-387/WHEC-387/WAGW-387)
- USS Gretchen (SP-423, SP-1181)
- USS Grey Fox (SP-52)
- USS Greyhound (1822, SP-437, IX-106)
- USS Gridley (DD-92, DD-380, DLG-21/CG-21, DDG-101)
- USS Griffin (AS-13)
- USS Griggs (APA-110)
- USS Grimes (APA-172)
- USS Grindall (DE-273)
- USS Grinnell (PC-1230/PCC-1230)
- USS Griswold (SP-3138, DE-7)
- USNS Grommet Reefer (T-AF-53)
- USS Grosbeak (1865, SP-566, AMc-19, AM-397, AMS-14/MSC(O)-14)
- USS Grosse Pointe (PC-1546)
- USS Grosser Kurfurst (ID-3005)
- USS Groton (PF-29, PCE-900, SSN-694, SSBN-828)
- USS Grouper (SS-214/SSK-214/AGSS-214)
- USS Grouse (AMc-12, AMS-15/MSC(O)-15, AM-398)
- USS Groves (DE-543)
- USS Growler (1812 schooner, 1812 sloop, SS-215, SSG-577)
- USS Grumium (AK-112/IX-174/AVS-3)
- USS Grundy (APA-111)
- USS Grunion (SS-216)

=== Gu–Gy ===
- USS Guadalcanal (ACV-60/CVE-60, LPH-7)
- USS Guadalupe (AO-32, T-AO-200)
- USS Gualala (AOG-28)
- USS Guam (PG-43/PR-3, CB-2, LPH-9)
- USS Guantanamo (ID-1637)
- USS Guard (1857, 1913, YP-2384)
- USS Guardfish (SS-217, SSN-612)
- USS Guardian (YAGR-1/AGR-1, PT-809, MCM-5)
- USS Guavina (SS-362/SSO-362/AGSS-362/AOSS-362)
- USS Gudgeon (SS-211, SS-567/AGSS-567/SSAG-567)
- USS Guerriere (1814, 1865)
- USS Guest (DD-472)
- USS Guide (AMc-83, AM-447/MSO-447)
- USS Guilford (APA-112)
- USS Guinevere (SP-512, IX-67)
- USS Guitarro (SS-363, SSN-665)
- USS Gulfport (SP-2989/AK-5, PF-20)
- SS Gulf Banker (AK-5044)
- SS Gulf Farmer (AK-5045)
- SS Gulf Merchant (AK-5046)
- SS Gulf Shipper (AK-2035)
- SS Gulf Trader (AK-2036)
- USS Gull (AM-74, AMS-16/AMCU-46/MHC-46, AM-399)
- USS Gum Tree (YN-13/AN-18)
- USS Gunason (DE-795)
- USS Gunnel (SS-253)
- USS Gunnison River (LSM(R)-508)
- USS Gunston Hall (APM-5/LSD-5, LSD-44)
- USS Gurke (DD-783)
- USS Gurkha (SP-600)
- USS Gurnard (SS-254, SSN-662)
- USNS Gus W. Darnell (T-AOT-1121)
- USS Gustafson (DE-182)
- USS Guyandot (AOG-16)
- USS Guymon (PCC-1177)
- USS Gwin (TB-16, DD-71, DD-433, DD-772/DM-33/MMD-33)
- USS Gwinnett (AK-185/AG-92/AVS-5)
- USS Gyatt (DD-712/DDG-1/DDG-712, DE-550)
- USS Gypsum Queen (SP-430)
- USS Gypsy (SP-55, ARS(D)-1)
- USNS Gyre (T-AGOR-21)
- USNS GYSGT Fred W. Stockham (T-AK-3017)

== H ==
- USS H-1 (SS-28)
- USS H-2 (SS-29)
- USS H-3 (SS-30)
- USS H-4 (SS-147)
- USS H-5 (SS-148)
- USS H-6 (SS-149)
- USS H-7 (SS-150)
- USS H-8 (SS-151)
- USS H-9 (SS-152)
- USS H. A. Baxter (SP-2285)
- USNS H. H. Hess (T-AGS-38)

=== Haa–Han ===
- USS Haas (DE-424)
- USS Habersham (AK-186)
- USS Hackberry (YN-20/AN-25)
- USS Hackensack (YTM-750)
- USS Hackleback (SS-295/AGSS-295)
- USS Haddo (SS-255, SSN-604)
- USS Haddock (SS-32, SS-231, SSN-621)
- USS Haggard (DD-555)
- USS Hague (1778)
- USS Haiglar (YTB-327)
- USS Hailey (DD-556)
- USS Haines (DE-792/APD-84)
- USNS Haiti Victory (T-AK-238)
- USS Hake (SS-256/AGSS-256)
- USS Halawa (AOG-12)
- USS Halcyon (SP-518, SP-1658)
- USS Halcyon II (SP-582)
- USS Hale (DD-133, DD-642/DMS-43)
- USS Haleakala (AE-25)
- USS Half Moon (AVP-26/WAVP-378/WHEC-378)
- USS Halfbeak (SS-352)
- USS Halford (DD-480)
- USS Halibut (SS-232, SSGN-587/SSN-587)
- USS Hall (DD-583)
- USS Halligan (DD-584)
- USS Halloran (DE-305)
- USS Hallowell (PG-180/PF-72)
- USS Halsey (DLG-23/CG-23, DDG-97)
- USS Halsey Powell (DD-686)
- USS Halstead (PG-184/PF-76)
- USS Halyburton (FFG-40)
- USS Hamblen (APA-114)
- USS Hambleton (DD-455/DMS-20)
- USS Hamburg (ID-3013)
- USS Hamilton (1812, DD-141/DMS-18/AG-111, FFG-66)
- USS Hamilton County (LST-802)
- USS Hamlin (AVG-15/ACV-15/CVE-15, AV-15)
- USS Hammann (DD-412, DE-131)
- USS Hammerberg (DE-1015)
- USS Hammerhead (SS-364, SSN-663)
- USS Hammondsport (APV-2/AKV-2)
- USS Hamner (DD-718)
- USS Hamond (PG-181/PF-73)
- USS Hampden (1776)
- USS Hampden County (LST-803)
- USS Hampshire (1777)
- USS Hampshire County (LST-819)
- USS Hampton (SP-3049, PCS-1386, APA-115, SSN-767)
- USS Hamul (AK-30/AD-20)
- USS Hancock (1775, 1776, 1778, AP-3/IX-12, CV-14, CV-19)
- USS Hanford (PC-1142)
- USS Hank (DD-702)
- USS Hanna (DE-449)
- USS Hannah (1775)
- USS Hannam (PG-185/PF-77)
- USS Hannibal (AG-1)
- USS Hanover (APA-116)
- USS Hansford (APA-106)
- USS Hanson (DD-832/DDR-832)

=== Har–Haz ===
- USS Haraden (DD-183, DD-585)
- USS Harcourt (1864, IX-225)
- USS Harder (SS-257, SS-568)
- USS Hardhead (SS-365)
- USS Harding (DD-91, DD-625/DMS-28)
- USS Hargood (PG-182/PF-74, DE-573)
- USS Harjurand (ARS-31)
- USS Harkness (AGS-12/AGSC-12/AMCU-12/MHC-12, T-AGS-32)
- USS Harlan County (LST-1196)
- USS Harlan R. Dickson (DD-708)
- USS Harland (PG-186/PF-78)
- USS Harlequin (AM-365/MSF-365)
- USS Harman (PG-187/PF-79)
- USS Harmon (DE-72, DE-678)
- USS Harnett (APA-240)
- USS Harnett County (LST-821/AGP-821)
- USS Harold C. Thomas (DE-21)
- USS Harold E. Holt (DE-1074/FF-1074)
- USS Harold J. Ellison (DD-864, DE-545)
- USS Harpers Ferry (LSD-49)
- USS Harpy (1865)
- USS Harrier (AM-366)
- USS Harriet Lane (1857)
- USNS Harriet Tubman (T-AO-213)
- USS Harris (AP-8/APA-2)
- USS Harris County (LST-822/T-LST-822)
- USS Harrisburg (ID-1663, LPD-30)
- USS Harrison (1761, DD-573)
- USS Harry Bumm (1864)
- USS Harry E. Hubbard (DD-748)
- USS Harry E. Yarnell (DLG-17/CG-17)
- USS Harry F. Bauer (DD-738/DM-26/MMD-26)
- USS Harry L. Corl (DE-598/APD-108)
- USS Harry Lee (AP-17/APA-10)
- USS Harry S. Truman (CVN-75)
- USS Harry W. Hill (DD-986)
- USS Hart (DD-110/DM-8, DD-594)
- USS Hartford (1858, SSN-768)
- USS Hartley (1875, DE-1029)
- USS Harvard (1888, SP-209)
- USS Harveson (DE-316/DER-316)
- USS Harvest (1861)
- USS Harvest Moon (1863)
- USS Harvest Queen (SP-1215)
- USS Harvey (PG-188/PF-80)
- USS Harvey C. Barnum Jr. (DDG-124)
- USNS Harvey Milk (T-AO-206)
- USS Harwood (DD-861/DDE-861)
- USS Haskell (APA-117)
- USS Hassalo (1863)
- USS Hassan Bashaw (1799)
- USS Hassayampa (AO-145/T-AO-145)
- USS Haste (PG-92)
- USS Hastings (1860)
- USS Hastwiana (YTB-512/YTM-775)
- USS Hatak (YT-219/YTB-219)
- USS Hatfield (DD-231/AG-84)
- USS Hatteras (1861, 1917, AVP-42)
- USS Hauoli (SP-249)
- USS Haven (AH-12/APH-112)
- USS Havenford (T-AG-179)
- USS Haverfield (DE-393/DER-393)
- USS Havre (PCE(C)-877)
- USS Hawaii (CB-3/CBC-1, SSN-776)
- USS Hawaiian (ID-3277)
- USS Hawes (FFG-53)
- USS Hawk (PY-2/IX-14, AM-133, AMS-17/MSC(O)-17, AM-400)
- USS Hawkbill (SS-366, SSN-666)
- USS Hawke (1778)
- USS Hawkins (DD-873/DDR-873)
- USNS Hayes (T-AG-195/T-AGOR-16)
- USS Hayler (DD-997)
- USS Haynsworth (DD-700)
- USS Hayter (DE-212/APD-80)
- USS Hazard (AM-240/MSF-240)
- USS Hazel (SP-1207, YN-24/AN-29)
- USS Hazelwood (DD-107, DD-531)
- USS Hazleton (SP-1770)

=== He ===
- USS Healy (DD-672)
- USS Heath Hen (AMc-6)
- USS Heather (1903, WAGL-331/WLB-331)
- USS Hebe (SP-966)
- USS Hecate (1869)
- USS Hecla (1846, 1869)
- USS Hector (1883, AC-7, AR-7)
- USS Hector A. Cafferata Jr. (ESB-8)
- USS Hecuba (AKS-12)
- USS Heed (AM-100/MSF-100)
- USS Heekon (YT-141/YTB-141/YTM-141)
- USS Heermann (DD-532)
- USS Helen (1813)
- USS Helen Baughman (SP-1292)
- USS Helen Euphane (SP-403)
- USS Helena (PG-9, CL-50, CL-113, CA-75, SSN-725)
- USS Helena I (SP-24)
- USS Helenita (SP-210, SP-2230/YP-2230)
- USS Helianthus (SP-585)
- USS Helios (ARB-12)
- USS Heliotrope (1863)
- USS Helm (DD-388)
- USS Helori (YP-181)
- USS Helvetia (SP-3096)
- USS Helmand Province (LHA-10)
- USS Hemminger (DE-746)
- USS Hempstead (AVP-43, APA-241)
- USS Henderson (AP-1, DD-785)
- USS Hendrick Hudson (1859)
- USS Hendry (APA-118)
- USS Henley (DD-39, DD-391, DD-762)
- USS Henlopen (SP-385)
- USS Hennepin (AK-187/T-AK-187)
- USS Henrico (AP-90/APA-45/LPA-45)
- USS Henry A. Wiley (DD-749/DM-29/MMD-29)
- USS Henry Andrew (1847)
- USS Henry B. Wilson (DD-957/DDG-7)
- USS Henry Brinker (1861)
- USS Henry Clay (SSBN-625)
- USS Henry County (IX-34, LST-824)
- USNS Henry Eckford (T-AO-192)
- USS Henry Gibbins (T-AP-183)
- USS Henry J. Kaiser (T-AO-187)
- USS Henry Janes (1861)
- USS Henry L. Stimson (SSBN-655)
- USS Henry M. Jackson (SSBN-730)
- USS Henry P. Williams (SP-509)
- USS Henry R. Kenyon (DE-683)
- USS Henry R. Mallory (ID-1280)
- USS Henry Seymour (SP-3225)
- USS Henry T. Allen (AP-30/APA-15/AG-90)
- USS Henry W. Tucker (DD-875/DDR-875, DE-377)
- USS Henshaw (DD-278)
- USNS Henson (T-AGS-63)
- USS Hepburn (DE-1055/FF-1055)
- USS Herald (1798, 1861, AM-101/MSF-101)
- USS Herald of the Morning (AP-173)
- USS Herbert (DD-160/APD-22)
- USS Herbert C. Jones (DE-137)
- USS Herbert J. Thomas (DD-833/DDR-833)
- USS Herbert L. Pratt (ID-2339)
- USS Hercules (1869, YT-13, YE-30, AK-41, PHM-2)
- USS Herkimer (AK-188/T-AK-188)
- USS Herman Frasch (ID-1617)
- USS Herman S. Caswell (SP-2311)
- USS Hermes (1914)
- USS Hermitage (AP-54, LSD-34)
- USS Herndon (DD-198, DD-638)
- USS Hero (1861, 1864, 1869)
- USS Heroic (AMc-84)
- USS Heron (AM-10/AVP-2, AMS-18/MSC(O)-18, MHC-52)
- USS Herreshoff No. 306 (SP-1841)
- USS Herreshoff No. 308 (SP-2232)
- USS Herreshoff No. 309 (SP-1218)
- USS Herreshoff No. 313 - never taken over by the Navy
- USS Herreshoff No. 321 (SP-2235)
- USS Herreshoff No. 322 (SP-2373)
- USS Herreshoff No. 323 (SP-2840)
- USS Herring (SS-233)
- USS Hershel "Woody" Williams (T-ESB-4/ESB-4)
- USS Herzog (DE-178, DE-277)
- USS Hesperia (AKS-13)
- USS Hetman (SP-1150)
- USS Hetzel (1861)
- USS Hewell (AG-145/AKL-14)
- USS Hewitt (DD-966)
- USS Heyliger (DE-510)
- USS Heywood (AP-12/APA-6)
- USS Heywood L. Edwards (DD-663)

=== Hi ===
- USS Hiamonee (YTB-513/YTM-776)
- USS Hiawatha (SP-183, ID-2892, YT-265)
- USS Hibiscus (1864)
- USS Hickman (ID-3554)
- USS Hickman County (LST-825)
- USS Hickox (DD-673)
- USS Hidalgo (AK-189)
- USS Hidatsa (AT-102/ATF-102)
- USS Higbee (DD-806/DDR-806)
- USS Higgins (DDG-76)
- USS High Ball (SP-947, 1905)
- USS High Point (PCH-1)
- USS Highland Light (IX-48)
- USS Highlands (APA-119)
- USS Highway (LSD-10)
- USS Hilarity (AM-241/MSF-241)
- USS Hilary P. Jones (DD-427)
- USS Hilbert (DE-742)
- USS Hildegarde (SP-1221)
- USS Hill (DE-141)
- USS Hillsborough County (LST-827)
- USS Hillsdale County (LST-835)
- USS Hilo (PG-58/AGP-2)
- USS Hilton (1911)
- USS Hilton Head (LSD-24)
- USS Hingham (PF-30)
- USS Hinsdale (APA-120)
- USS Hippocampus (SP-654)
- USS Hisada (YTB-518/YTM-518)
- USS Hisko (ID-1953)
- USS Hissem (DE-400/DER-400)
- USS Hist (1895)
- USS Hitchiti (AT-103/ATF-103)
- USS Hiwassee (AOG-29)

=== Ho ===
- USS Hobart Bay (CVE-113)
- USS Hobby (DD-610)
- USS Hobcaw (SP-252)
- USS Hobe Sound (AV-20)
- USS Hobo II (SP-783)
- USS Hobson (DD-464/DMS-26)
- USS Hocking (APA-121)
- USS Hodges (DE-231)
- USS Hoe (SS-258)
- USS Hoel (DD-533, DD-768, DDG-13)
- Hoga (YT-146/YTB-146/YTM-146)
- USS Hogan (DD-178/DMS-6/AG-105)
- USS Hoggatt Bay (CVE-75/CVHE-75/AKV-25)
- USS Hoist (ARS-40)
- USS Holder (DE-401, DD-819)
- USS Holland (SS-1, AS-3/ARG-18, AS-32)
- USS Hollandia (CVE-97/CVU-97/AKV-33)
- USS Hollidaysburg (PCS-1385)
- USS Hollis (DE-794/APD-86/LPR-86)
- USS Hollister (DD-788)
- USS Holly (1881, YN-14/AN-19)
- USS Hollyhock (1863)
- USS Holmes (PG-189/PF-81, DE-572)
- USS Holmes County (LST-836)
- USS Holston River (LSM(R)-509)
- USS Holt (DE-706)
- USS Holton (DE-703)
- USS Hombro (YTB-506/YTM-769)
- USS Home (1862)
- USS Honduras (1861)
- USS Honesdale (PC-566)
- USS Honesty (PG-90)
- USS Honeysuckle (1862)
- USS Honolulu (ID-1843, CL-48, SSN-718)
- USS Hooper (DE-1026)
- USS Hooper Island (ARG-17)
- USS Hope (1861, AH-7)
- USS Hopestill (SP-191)
- USS Hopewell (DD-181, DD-681)
- USS Hopi (AT-71/ATF-71)
- USS Hopkins (DD-6, SP-3294, DD-249/DMS-13)
- USS Hopocan (YN-33/YNT-1/YTM-728)
- USS Hopper (DDG-70)
- USS Hopping (DE-155/APD-51)
- USS Hoptree (YN-83/AN-62)
- USS Hoqua (SP-142)
- USS Hoquiam (PG-113/PF-5)
- USS Horace A. Bass (DE-691/APD-124/LPR-124)
- USS Horace Beals (1862)
- USS Horn Snake (1775)
- USS Hornbill (AMc-13, AMS-19/MSC(O)-19)
- USS Hornby (PG-190/PF-82)
- USS Horne (DLG-30/CG-30)
- USS Hornet (1775, 1790s, 1805, 1813, 1865, 1898, CV-8, CV-12)
- MV Hos Bluewater ()
- MV Hos Gemstone ()
- MV Hos Greystone ()
- MV Hos Silverstar ()
- USS Hoste (PG-191/PF-83, DE-521)
- USS Hotham (PG-183/PF-75, DE-574)
- USS Hotspur (AP-102)
- USS Houghton (PCC-588)
- USS Houma (ID-4341-A, YTB-811)
- USS Housatonic (1861, SP-1697, AO-35)
- USS Houston (AK-1, CL-30/CA-30, CL-81, SSN-713)
- USS Hova (DE-110)
- USS Hoven (1919)
- USS Hovey (DD-208/DMS-11)
- USS Howard (DD-179/DMS-7/AG-106, DDG-83)
- USS Howard D. Crow (DE-252)
- USS Howard F. Clark (DE-533)
- USS Howard Greene (SP-2200)
- USNS Howard O. Lorenzen (T-AGM-25)
- USS Howard W. Gilmore (AS-16)
- USS Howarda (SP-144)
- USS Howell Cobb (1861)
- USS Howett (PG-192/PF-84)
- USS Howick Hall (ID-1303)
- USS Howorth (DD-592)
- USS Howquah (1863)
- USS Hoxbar (1919)
- USS Hoyt (1863)

=== Hu–Hy ===
- USS Hubbard (DE-211/APD-53)
- USS Hudson (1826, 1898, DD-475, T-AO-184/T-AOT-184)
- USS Hué City (CG-66)
- USS Hugh L. Scott (AP-43)
- USS Hugh Purvis (DD-709)
- USS Hugh W. Hadley (DD-774)
- USS Hughes (DD-410)
- USS Hulbert (DD-342/AVD-6/AVP-19/APD-28)
- USS Hull (DD-7, DD-330, DD-350, DD-945)
- USS Humboldt (AVP-21/AG-121/WAVP-372/WHEC-372)
- USS Hummer (AMS-20/MSC(O)-20, AM-367, AM-401)
- USS Humming Bird (AMc-26)
- USS Hummingbird (AMS-192/MSC-192)
- USS Humphreys (DD-236/APD-12)
- USS Hunch (SP-1197)
- USS Hunchback (1852)
- USS Hunley (AS-31)
- USS Hunt (DD-194, DD-674)
- USS Hunter (1806)
- USS Hunter Liggett (AP-27/APA-14)
- USS Hunter Marshall (DE-602/APD-112)
- USS Hunterdon County (LST-838/AGP-838)
- USS Hunting (E-AG-398)
- USS Huntington (CA-5, CL-77, CL-107)
- USS Huntress (1862, 1895)
- USS Huntsville (1861, T-AGM-7)
- USS Hupa (SP-650)
- USS Huron (1861, 1875, ID-1408, CA-9, PG-127/PF-19)
- USS Hurricane (PC-3)
- USS Hurst (SP-3196, DE-250)
- USS Huse (DE-145)
- USS Hustle (YFB-6)
- USS Hutchins (DD-476)
- USS Hutchinson (PG-153/PF-45)
- USS Hyac (SP-216)
- USS Hyacinth (1862, 1902)
- USS Hyades (AF-28)
- USS Hyannis (YTB-817)
- USS Hyde (APA-173/LPA-173)
- USS Hydra (1869, AK-82)
- USS Hydrangea (1862)
- USS Hydraulic (SP-2584)
- USS Hydrographer (1917, PY-30/AGS-2/MSS-19)
- USS Hydrus (AKA-28)
- USS Hyman (DD-732)
- USS Hyman G. Rickover (SSN-709, SSN-795)
- USS Hyperion (AK-107)
