= USS Halcyon =

USS Halcyon may refer to the following ships of the United States Navy:

- USS Halcyon (SP-518), a patrol vessel commissioned 14 May 1917 and decommissioned 24 June 1919 which then served as a research vessel in the United States Bureau of Fisheries fleet as USFS Halcyon from 1919 to 1927
- USS Halcyon (SP-1658), a patrol craft that served briefly in 1917
- USS Halcyon II (SP-582), a patrol vessel in commission from 1917 to 1919.
