= USS Hurst =

USS Hurst has been the name of more than one United States Navy ship, and may refer to:

- USS Hurst (SP-3196), a patrol boat in commission from 1918 to 1919
- USS Hurst (DE-250), a destroyer escort in commission from 1943 to 1946
