= USS Garland =

USS Garland is a name used more than once by the U.S. Navy:

- USS Garland (1815), was a bark built at Quincy, Massachusetts, in 1815 for service as a privateer
- USS Garland (AM-238), was a minesweeper launched 20 February 1944
