= USS Hazel =

USS Hazel is a name used more than once by the United States Navy, and may refer to:

- USS Hazel (SP-1207), a patrol boat in commission from 1917 to 1919
- USS Hazel (AN-29), later YN-29, a net laying ship in commission from 1942 to 1958
