= USS Helenita =

USS Helenita is a name used more than once by the U.S. Navy:

- USS Helenita (SP-210), a yacht commissioned 17 October 1917 at Morris Heights, New York.
- USS Helenita (YP-2230), a small wooden motor boat acquired by the Navy in 1919.
