= USS Hero =

USS Hero may refer to the following ships of the United States Navy:

- USS Hero (1861), was purchased by the US Navy in August 1861 and sunk as part of the Stone Fleet in November 1861
- USS Hero (1864), was purchased by the US Navy on 11 July 1864 and renamed Mocassin on 25 July
- USS Hero (1869), was originally the light draft monitor Casco, renamed Hero on 15 June 1869
