= USS Hummer (AMS-20) =

Minesweeper of the United States Navy

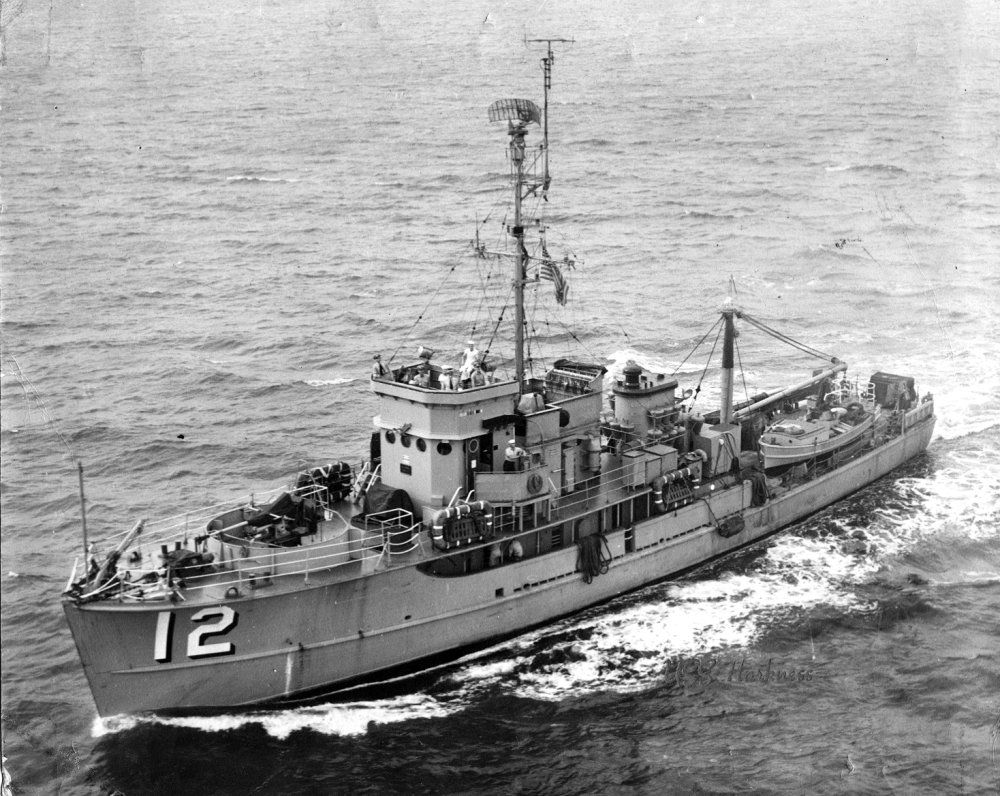
- A YMS-1-class minesweeper

History

United States
- Ordered: as USS YMS-372
- Laid down: 11 December 1942
- Launched: 23 December 1943
- Commissioned: 28 March 1944
- Decommissioned: 23 June 1946
- In service: 3 November 1950
- Out of service: 13 November 1953
- Stricken: 12 February 1959
- Fate: transferred to Japan, 29 January 1959

History

Japan
- Name: JDS Moroshima (MSC-663)
- Acquired: 29 January 1959

General characteristics
- Displacement: 215 tons
- Length: 136 ft (41 m)
- Beam: 24 ft 6 in (7.47 m)
- Draught: 10 ft (3.0 m)
- Speed: 13 knots
- Complement: 50
- Armament: one 3 in (76 mm) gun mount

USS Hummer (AMS-20/YMS-372) was a YMS-1-class minesweeper of the YMS-135 subclass acquired by the U.S. Navy for the task of removing mines that had been placed in the water to prevent ships from passing.

== History ==
Hummer (YMS-372) was launched as YMS-372, 23 December 1943 by Weaver Shipyards, Orange, Texas; and commissioned 28 March 1944. She was named Hummer and reclassified AMS-20 on 17 February 1947.

After shakedown and operational training in early 1945, Hummer departed the United States to sweep mines and to patrol between Okinawa and Japan from 29 June to 31 July.

With the cessation of hostilities, the ship swept mines on the coasts of Japan and Korea until 21 February 1946 when she departed for the Western Seaboard of the United States.

Hummer decommissioned 23 June and joined the Pacific Reserve Fleet. She recommissioned 3 November 1950 to help support the United Nations commitment to containing aggression in Korea. Her training and readiness activities centered on the U.S. West Coast between San Diego, California, and San Francisco, California, until 13 November 1953 when she again decommissioned at Long Beach, California. Reclassified MSC(O)-20, 7 February 1955, the ship was transferred to the Japanese Maritime Self Defense Force 29 January 1959, serving as Moroshima.

== Military awards and honors ==
Hummer received three battle stars for her service World War II.
