= USS Gurnard =

USS Gurnard has been the name of more than one United States Navy ship, and may refer to:

- USS Gurnard (SS-254), a Gato-class submarine in commission from 1942 to 1945
- USS Gurnard (SSN-662), a Sturgeon-class nuclear submarine in commission from 1968 to 1995
