= USS Greenling =

USS Greenling has been the name of more than one United States Navy ship, and may refer to:

- USS Greenling (SS-213), a submarine in commission from 1942 to 1946
- USS Greenling (SSN-614), a submarine in commission from 1967 to 1994.
