= USS Gamage =

USS Gamage is a name used more than once by the U.S. Navy:

- USS Gamage (1864), was a Civil War gunboat commissioned at Mound City, Illinois 23 March 1865
- USS Gamage (IX-227), was launched on 8 March 1943 for use as floating storage for lubricants and drummed petroleum products
