= USS Gaivota =

Patrol vessel of the United States Navy

History

United States
- Name: USS Gaivota
- Namesake: Previous name retained
- Builder: A. C. Brown, Tottenville, Staten Island, New York
- Completed: 1897
- Acquired: 8 June 1917
- Commissioned: 13 September 1917
- Decommissioned: 11 May 1918
- Fate: Returned to owner
- Notes: Operated as private steam yacht Gaivota, 1897-1917 and from 1918

General characteristics
- Type: Patrol vessel
- Tonnage: 74 gross register tons
- Length: 91 ft 8 in (27.94 m)
- Beam: 15 ft 9 in (4.80 m)
- Depth: 8 ft 6 in (2.59 m)
- Propulsion: Steam engine
- Speed: 14 knots
- Complement: 7
- Armament: 1 × 3-pounder gun; 1 × 1-pounder; 1 × machine gun

USS Gaivota (SP-436) was a United States Navy patrol vessel in commission from 1917 to 1918.

Gaivota was built as a private steam yacht of the same name in 1897 by A. C. Brown of Tottenville, Staten Island, New York. On 8 June 1917, the U.S. Navy chartered Gaivota from her owner, Alfred C. Maron, for use as a section patrol vessel during World War I. She was fitted out as a patrol craft in the Philadelphia Navy Yard at Philadelphia, Pennsylvania, and commissioned as USS Gaivota (SP-436) on 13 September 1917.

After conducting target practice in the Delaware Bay, Gaivota underwent alterations at the Philadelphia Navy Yard. Assigned for duty to the 4th Naval District, she reached Cold Spring, New Jersey, on 9 November 1917 to serve as a unit of the harbor entrance patrol off Cold Spring and Breakwater Harbor, New Jersey, and Lewes, Delaware.

Gaivota returned to the Philadelphia Navy Yard on 19 April 1918 and was decommissioned on 11 May 1918 for return to her owner.
