= USS Hampton (PCS-1386) =

Patrol vessel of the United States Navy

History

United States
- Name: USS PCS-1386 (1944–1956); USS Hampton (1956–1959)
- Namesake: PCS-1386 was her hull number; Hampton was for Hampton County, South Carolina
- Builder: Wheeler Shipbuilding Corporation, Whitestone, New York
- Laid down: 15 May 1943
- Launched: 28 September 1944
- Commissioned: 4 November 1944
- Decommissioned: 27 April 1956
- Renamed: USS Hampton (PCS-1386) 15 February 1956
- Stricken: 1 July 1959
- Fate: Sold

General characteristics
- Type: Patrol craft sweeper
- Displacement: 251 tons
- Length: 136 ft (41 m)
- Beam: 25 ft (7.6 m)
- Draft: 9 ft (2.7 m)
- Propulsion: Two 800-brake horsepower (597-kilowatt) General Motors 8-268A diesel engines, Snow and Knobstedt single reduction gear two shafts
- Speed: 14 knots
- Complement: 59
- Armament: 1 × 3-inch 50-caliber (76.2-mm) dual-purpose gun mount; 1 × 40-mm guns; 2 × 20-mm guns; 2 × depth charge projectors; 1 × Hedgehog; 2 × depth charge tracks

USS PCS-1386, later renamed USS Hampton (PCS-1386), was a United States Navy patrol craft sweeper - a type of patrol minesweeper - in commission from 1944 to 1956. When renamed, she became the third U.S. Navy ship to bear the name Hampton.

== Construction and commissioning ==
PCS-1386 laid down by the Wheeler Shipbuilding Corporation at Whitestone, New York. Launched on 28 September 1944, she was commissioned on 4 November 1944.

== Operational history ==
Equipped with the latest sonar gear, PCS-1386 was assigned to the Fleet Sound School Squadron following her shakedown period. From her arrival at Key West, Florida, on 25 November 1944, until the end of World War II in August 1945, she trained officers and enlisted men in submarine detection, preparing the students to operate the range recorder and attack plotter during antisubmarine warfare operations by destroyers and destroyer escorts.

After World War II, PCS-1386 continued training operations based at Key West. She also participated in naval exercises in the Atlantic Ocean, Caribbean Sea, and Gulf of Mexico between 1946 and 1956.

PCS-1386 was renamed USS Hampton (PCS-1386) on 15 February 1956. She was the third U.S. Navy ship to bear the name Hampton.

== Decommissioning, reserve training use, and disposal ==
Hampton was decommissioned on 27 April 1956. She was transferred to the 5th Naval District and assigned to the Naval Reserve Training Center, Baltimore, Maryland. She operated as a training ship in a non-commissioned status until she was stricken from the Navy List on 1 July 1959 and sold.
