= USS Hobo II =

Patrol vessel of the United States Navy

History

United States
- Name: USS Hobo II
- Namesake: Previous name retained
- Builder: Electric Launch Company (ELCO), Bayonne, New Jersey
- Completed: 1905
- Acquired: 23 June 1917
- Commissioned: 24 August 1917
- Fate: Returned to owner 17 February 1919
- Notes: Operated as private motorboat Hobo II 1905-1917 and from 1919

General characteristics
- Type: Patrol vessel
- Tonnage: 24 Gross register tons
- Length: 75 ft (23 m)
- Beam: 10 ft (3.0 m)
- Draft: 4 ft (1.2 m)
- Speed: 14 knots

USS Hobo II (SP-783) was a United States Navy patrol vessel in commission from 1917 to 1919.

Hobo II was built in 1905 as a private motorboat of the same name by the Electric Launch Company (ELCO) at Bayonne, New Jersey. On 23 June 1917, the U.S. Navy acquired her from her owner, J. S. Melcher of New York City, for use as a section patrol boat during World War I. She was commissioned at Boston, Massachusetts, as USS Hobo II (SP-783) on 24 August 1917.

Assigned to the 1st Naval District in northern New England, Hobo II initially was based at Bar Harbor, Maine, where she operated on harbor patrol duties. On 21 January 1918 she was transferred to Boston, where she performed dispatch boat and general patrol duties for the rest of World War I and into 1919.

Hobo II was returned to Melcher on 17 February 1919.
