= USS General R. M. Blatchford =

The following ships of the United States Navy have been named USS General R. M. Blatchford;

- USS General R. M. Blatchford (AP-118), a General John Pope-class transport renamed USS General W. P. Richardson, launched in 1944 that served in World War II and scrapped in 2005
- USS General R. M. Blatchford (AP-153), a General G. O. Squier-class transport launched in 1944, later transferred to the Maritime Commission for use as a United States Army transport and scrapped in 1980.
