= USS Gemsbok =

USS Gemsbok is a name used more than once by the U.S. Navy:

- USS Gemsbok (1861) was a Civil War gunboat commissioned 30 August 1861
- USS Gemsbok (IX-117) was a tanker commissioned 3 December 1943
