= USS Georgiana =

Two vessels have served the United States Navy under the name USS Georgiana:

- Georgiana (1791 ship) was launched in 1791. She served as a merchantman, packet ship for the British East India Company (EIC), a whaler, a warship of the navy of the United States of America, and a merchant vessel again. She was condemned as leaky and sold in 1818.
- USS Georgiana III (SP-83) was an armed yacht that served the United States Navy as a patrol vessel from 1917 to 1918.
