= USS Hazleton =

Patrol vessel of the United States Navy

History

United States
- Name: USS Hazleton
- Namesake: Previous name retained
- Builder: Great Lakes Boat Building Corporation, Milwaukee, Wisconsin
- Completed: 1917
- Acquired: 19 September 1917
- Commissioned: 25 August 1918
- Fate: Returned to owner 10 December 1918
- Notes: Operated as private motorboat Hazleton 1917 and from 1918

General characteristics
- Type: Patrol vessel
- Tonnage: 11 Gross register tons
- Displacement: 10 tons
- Length: 40 ft (12 m)
- Beam: 9 ft 8 in (2.95 m)
- Draft: 1 ft 8 in (0.51 m)
- Speed: 20 knots
- Armament: None

USS Hazleton (SP-1770) was a United States Navy patrol vessel in commission from August to December 1918.

Hazleton was built as a private motorboat of the same name in 1917 by the Great Lakes Boat Building Corporation at Milwaukee, Wisconsin. On 19 September 1917, the U.S. Navy chartered her from her owner, G. B. Markle of Hazleton, Pennsylvania, for use as a section patrol boat during World War I. Enrolled in the Naval Coast Defense Reserve at Milwaukee, she was taken to Newport, Rhode Island to be fitted out for naval service. She was commissioned at Newport as USS Hazleton (SP-1770) on 25 August 1918.

Assigned to the 2nd Naval District in southern New England, Hazleton served as a dispatch boat in the Newport area for the rest of World War I. The Navy returned her to Markle on 10 December 1918.
