= USS Holder =

USS Holder has been the name of two ships of the United States Navy. Both ships are named for Lieutenant (jg) Randolph Mitchell Holder, a Navy pilot who died during the Battle of Midway.

- USS Holder (DE-401), an Edsall-class destroyer escort, which was heavily damaged during combat in 1944 and taken out of service.
- USS Holder (DD-819), a Gearing-class destroyer, that was completed in 1945 and served until 1976 when it was transferred to Ecuador.
