= USS Hammerhead =

Two boats of the United States Navy have borne the name USS Hammerhead, named in honor of the hammerhead shark, a voracious shark, found in warm seas, with a curious hammerlike head.

- USS Hammerhead (SS-364), was a Gato-class submarine, commissioned in 1944
- USS Hammerhead (SSN-663), was a Sturgeon-class submarine, commissioned in 1968 and struck in 1995
