= USS Gettysburg =

Three ships of the United States Navy have been named USS Gettysburg for the Battle of Gettysburg.

- USS Gettysburg (1858) was built in 1858, captured in 1863, commissioned in 1864 and decommissioned in 1879
- USS Gettysburg (PCE-904) was commissioned in 1945, named Gettysburg in 1956 and sold for scrap in 1960
- USS Gettysburg (CG-64) was commissioned in 1991 and is currently in active service
