= USS Henderson =

USS Henderson may refer to the following ships of the United States Navy:

- USS Henderson (AP-1), a transport, commissioned in 1917. In 1943, she was converted to a hospital ship and commissioned as USS Bountiful (AH-9).
- USS Henderson (DD-785), a destroyer, commissioned in 1946 and struck in 1980.
