= USS Grosbeak (SP-566) =

Patrol vessel of the United States Navy

History

United States
- Laid down: date unknown
- Launched: date unknown
- Acquired: 17 April 1917
- Commissioned: 17 April 1917
- Decommissioned: date unknown
- Stricken: 1919
- Fate: Sold, 21 March 1920

General characteristics
- Displacement: not known
- Length: 38 ft (12 m)
- Beam: 8 ft 4 in (2.54 m)
- Draft: 2 ft 6 in (0.76 m)
- Speed: 15 knots
- Armament: one machine gun

USS Grosbeak (SP-566) was a Grosbeak-class patrol boat acquired by the U.S. Navy for the task of patrolling and defending America's harbors and coasts.

Grosbeak, built by Rice Brothers, Boothbay, Maine, was acquired from her owner It. C. Robbins, Hamilton, Massachusetts, 17 April 1917.

== World War I service ==
She served as a coastal patrol craft along the New England coast from Chatham, Massachusetts, to New London, Connecticut, during World War I.

== Deactivation ==
Her name was struck from the Navy List in 1919 and she was sold to Clarence Kugler, Philadelphia, Pennsylvania, 21 March 1920.
