= USS Hoqua =

Armed yacht

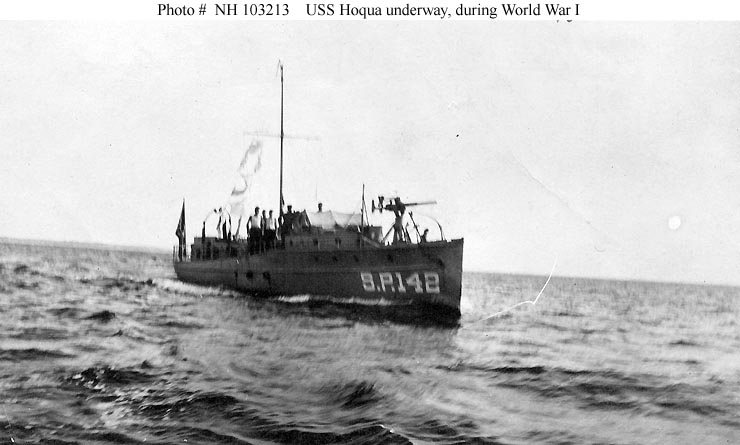
- USS Hoqua in 1917 or 1918, probably near New York City.

History

United States
- Name: USS Hoqua
- Namesake: Previous name retained
- Builder: Charles Seabury, Morris Heights, the Bronx, New York
- Completed: 1914
- Acquired: June 1917
- Commissioned: 27 July 1917
- Fate: Returned to owner 6 February 1919
- Notes: Operated as private yacht Hoqua 1914-1917 and from 1919

General characteristics
- Type: Patrol vessel
- Displacement: 35 tons
- Length: 69 ft 7 in (21.21 m)
- Beam: 13 ft 2 in (4.01 m)
- Draft: 4 ft (1.2 m)
- Speed: 11 knots
- Armament: 4 × 3-pounder gun

USS Hoqua (SP-142) was an armed yacht that served in the United States Navy as a patrol vessel from 1917 to 1919.

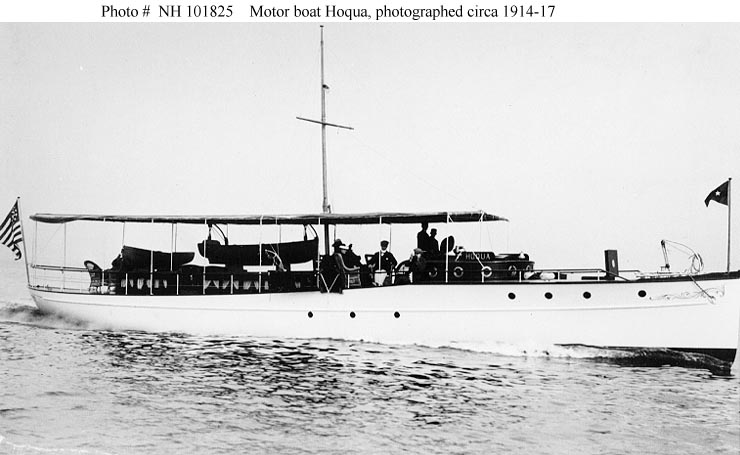
Hoqua as a private yacht sometime between 1914 and 1917, prior to her U.S. Navy service.

Hoqua was built as a civilian yacht in 1914 by Charles Seabury at Morris Heights in the Bronx, New York. The U.S. Navy acquired her from her owner, Robert M. Curtis of Chicago, Illinois, in June 1917 for use as a patrol vessel during World War I. She was commissioned at Brooklyn, New York, on 27 July 1917 as USS Hoqua (SP-142).

Hoqua was assigned to the 3rd Naval District, and performed general harbor duties at Brooklyn until 27 March 1918, when she arrived at New Haven, Connecticut, for duty. She served there as an inshore patrol vessel and as an escort for submarines in and around New Haven harbor for the remainder of the war.

The Navy returned Hoqua to her owner on 6 February 1919.
