= USS Hecla =

USS Hecla may refer to more than one United States Navy ship:

- USS Hecla (1846), a bomb brig purchased in 1846 and sold in 1848 after service in the Mexican War
- USS Hecla (1869), a never-completed monitor originally named Shakamaxon and later renamed Nebraska, scrapped incomplete in 1875
