= USS Hippocampus =

Patrol vessel of the United States Navy

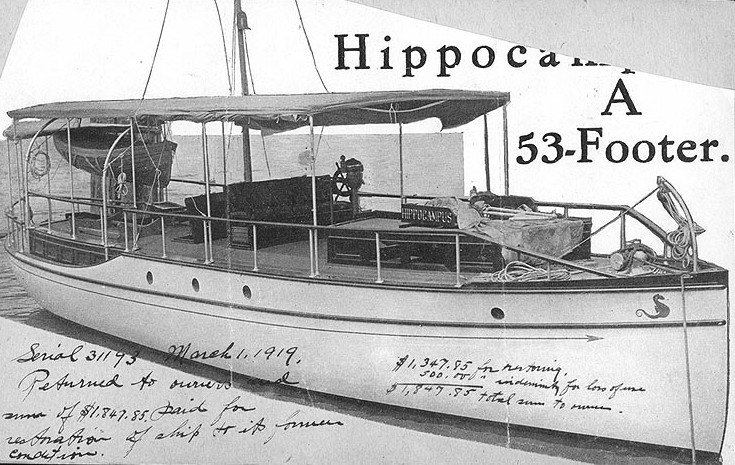
- Hand written notes are on the original print, which is mounted on Hippocampus' "SP" data card, and reflect the compensation paid to the boat's owner for her use by the Navy during World War I.

History

United States
- Name: USS Hippocampus
- Namesake: name previously retained
- Laid down: 1912
- Launched: 1913 at New York City
- Acquired: 21 June 1917
- Commissioned: 25 June 1917
- Decommissioned: November 1918
- Stricken: 1918
- Home port: Rockland, Maine
- Identification: serial #31193
- Fate: Returned to her owner on 5 April 1919

General characteristics
- Type: yacht
- Displacement: 23 tons
- Length: 56 ft (17 m)
- Beam: 11 ft 4 in (3.45 m)
- Draft: 2 ft 6 in (0.76 m)
- Propulsion: gasoline engine
- Speed: 11 knots
- Armament: one 11-pounder gun

USS Hippocampus (SP-654) was a yacht leased by the U.S. Navy during World War I. She was used as a patrol boat along the New England coast.

== Built in New York ==
Hippocampus, a gasoline-powered yacht, was built by New York Yacht, Launch, & Engine Co. in 1912–1913 and was leased by the Navy from her owner, James F. Porter, of Chicago, Illinois, 21 June 1917. She was commissioned 25 June at Rockland, Maine.

== World War I service ==
Assigned to the 1st Naval District, Hippocampus served as a harbor patrol craft at the harbor entrance, Rockland, Maine, and in Penobscot Bay during World War I.

== Post-war disposal ==
Post-war Hippocampus was decommissioned 30 November 1918 and returned to her owner 5 April 1919, who was paid $1847.85 for the use of his vessel ($500 for loss of use by the owner, and $1,347.85 for refurbishment to return the craft to its pre-war condition).
