= USS Harcourt =

USS Harcourt may refer to the following ships of the United States Navy:

- USS Harcourt (1864), a Civil War tugboat that served on the Union blockade
- USS Harcourt (IX-225), a Liberty ship launched 27 December 1942 and sold for scrap in 1962
