= USS Genevieve =

Ferry of the United States Navy

History

United States
- Name: USS Genevieve
- Namesake: Previous name retained
- Completed: 1895
- Acquired: 19 September 1918
- Commissioned: 9 December 1918
- Decommissioned: 9 August 1919
- Fate: Sold 20 November 1919
- Notes: Operated as private yacht and commercial fishing boat Genevieve 1895–1917

General characteristics
- Type: Ferry
- Displacement: 95 tons
- Length: 82 ft (25 m)
- Beam: 16 ft (4.9 m)
- Draft: 5 ft (1.5 m)
- Propulsion: Steam engine
- Speed: 12 knots
- Capacity: 73 passengers
- Armament: None

USS Genevieve (SP-459) was a United States Navy ferry in commission from 1918 to 1919.

Genevieve was built as a private steam yacht of the same name in 1895 at New Bedford, Massachusetts. She later was converted for use as a charter fishing boat.

On 19 September 1918, the U.S. Navy purchased Genevieve from her owners, F. H. Myer and A. S. Smith of New York City, for use as a section patrol vessel during World War I, although the war ended on 11 November 1918 before her commissioning . However, she was commissioned as USS Genevieve (SP-459) on 9 December 1918.

Assigned to the Naval Overseas Transportation Service in the 3rd Naval District, Genevieve operated as a water taxi in the New York City area throughout her nine-month naval career, often carrying civilian working parties and their gear from dock to dock and ship to shore.

Genevieve was decommissioned on 9 August 1919 and sold on 20 November 1919 to Marvin Briggs, Inc. of New York City.
