= USS Garfield County =

Ship

History

United States
- Name: USS LST-784
- Builder: Dravo Corporation, Pittsburgh
- Laid down: 18 June 1944
- Launched: 29 July 1944
- Commissioned: 1 September 1944
- Decommissioned: March 1946
- Renamed: USS Garfield County (LST-784), 1 July 1955
- Honours and awards: 2 battle stars (World War II)
- Fate: Unknown

General characteristics
- Class & type: LST-542-class tank landing ship
- Displacement: 1,625 long tons (1,651 t) light; 4,080 long tons (4,145 t) full
- Length: 328 ft (100 m)
- Beam: 50 ft (15 m)
- Draft: Unloaded : 2 ft 4 in (0.71 m) forward; 7 ft 6 in (2.29 m) aft; Loaded : 8 ft 2 in (2.49 m) forward; 14 ft 1 in (4.29 m) aft
- Propulsion: 2 × General Motors 12-567 diesel engines, two shafts, twin rudders
- Speed: 12 knots (22 km/h; 14 mph)
- Boats & landing craft carried: 2 LCVPs
- Troops: 16 officers, 147 enlisted men
- Complement: 7 officers, 104 enlisted men
- Armament: 1 × single 3"/50 caliber gun mount; 8 × 40 mm guns; 12 × 20 mm guns

USS Garfield County (LST-784) was an LST-542-class tank landing ship built for the United States Navy during World War II. Named after counties in Colorado, Montana, Nebraska, Oklahoma, Utah, and Washington, she was the only U.S. Naval vessel to bear the name.

LST-784 was laid down on 18 June 1944 at Pittsburgh, Pennsylvania by the Dravo Corporation; launched on 29 July 1944; sponsored by Mrs. Michael Ruzic; and commissioned on 1 September 1944.

== Service history ==
During World War II, LST-784 was assigned to the Asiatic-Pacific theater and participated in the assault and occupation of Iwo Jima in February and March, 1945 and the assault and occupation of Okinawa Gunto in April through June, 1945. Following the war, LST-784 performed occupation duty in the Far East until mid-September 1945. She was decommissioned in March 1946 and assigned to the Columbia River Group of the Pacific Reserve Fleet. On 1 July 1955, the ship was redesignated USS Garfield County (LST-784). Her final fate is unknown.

LST-784 earned two battle stars for World War II service.

== See also ==
- List of United States Navy LSTs
