= USS Hartley =

USS Hartley may refer to:

- USS Hartley (1875), was built at San Francisco in 1875. Acquired from the Coast Guard for use in World War I, she served as a harbor patrol ship out of San Francisco. Hartley was returned to the Coast Guard 15 February 1919
- USS Hartley (DE-1029), was a Dealey-class destroyer escort launched in November 1956 and sold to Columbia in 1972
