= USS Harkness =

USS Harkness may refer to the following ships operated by the United States Navy:

- USS Harkness (AMCU-12), was a survey ship launched in 1942 and decommissioned in 1958
- USNS Harkness (AGS-32), was a survey ship launched in 1968 and transferred to the Maritime Administration in 1994
