= USS Holly (1881) =

Patrol vessel of the United States Navy

History

United States
- Name: USS Holly
- Namesake: Any of a genus of trees and shrubs having thick, glossy, spiny margined leaves and bright red berries
- Owner: U.S. Department of Commerce, U.S. Lighthouse Service
- Completed: 1881
- Acquired: by the Navy, 15 April 1917
- Home port: Norfolk, Virginia
- Fate: Returned to the Lighthouse Service by Executive order dated 1 July 1919

General characteristics
- Type: lighthouse tender
- Tonnage: 367
- Length: 176 ft (54 m)
- Beam: 24 ft (7.3 m)
- Draft: 8 ft 6 in (2.59 m)
- Propulsion: steam engine
- Speed: 9 knots (17 km/h; 10 mph)
- Complement: 23 officers and enlisted

USS Holly was a lighthouse tender borrowed by the U.S. Navy from the U.S. Commerce Department during World War I and armed as a patrol craft. Holly was used to patrol the waters near Norfolk, Virginia. Post-war she was returned to the Commerce Department.

== Service history ==
The first ship to be so named by the Navy, Holly, a wood and steel lighthouse tender, was built in Baltimore, Maryland, in 1881, and was owned by the Department of Commerce, Lighthouse Service, until being taken over by the Navy 15 April 1917. She served in the 5th Naval District, operating from Norfolk, Virginia, on general and patrol duty during the balance of World War I. The steamer was returned to the Lighthouse Service by Executive order dated 1 July 1919.

== See also ==
- USLHT Holly
