= USS Guard =

USS Guard may refer to the following ships of the United States Navy:

- USS Guard (1857), purchased by the U.S. Navy in 1861 as USS National Guard; renamed in 1866; final decommissioning in 1878; sold in 1883
- USS Guard (1913), a tug built for the United States Coast Guard at the Mare Island Naval Shipyard; served in the U.S. Navy during World War I; returned to the Coast Guard in 1919; decommissioned and sold in 1943
- USS Guard (YP-2384), a wooden motor launch built in 1902; purchased as Floyd Hurst by the U.S. Navy in 1918; served as dispatch boat between Washington Navy Yard and the Indian Head Naval Proving Ground; renamed, then sold in 1921
