= USS George P. Squires =

Patrol vessel of the United States Navy

History

United States
- Name: USS George P. Squires
- Namesake: Previous name retained
- Builder: Henry Brusster, Baltimore, Maryland
- Completed: 1900
- Acquired: 12 May 1917 (purchased); 21 May 1917 (delivered)
- Commissioned: 21 May 1917
- Decommissioned: 27 July 1918
- Fate: Sold 23 October 1918
- Notes: Served as civilian fishing vessel George P. Squires 1900-1917

General characteristics
- Type: Patrol vessel and minesweeper
- Tonnage: 218 tons
- Length: 142 ft 6 in (43.43 m)
- Beam: 22 ft (6.7 m)
- Draft: 12 ft (3.7 m)
- Propulsion: Steam engine
- Speed: 10 knots
- Complement: 27
- Armament: None

USS George P. Squires (SP-303) was United States Navy patrol vessel and minesweeper in commission from 1917 to 1918.

George P. Squires was built as a civilian fishing steamer of the same name in 1900 by Henry Brusster at Baltimore, Maryland. The U.S. Navy purchased her for World War I service as a patrol vessel and minesweeper from her owner, Bellows and Squires, Inc., of Ocran, Virginia, on 12 May 1917. Bellows and Squires delivered her to the Navy on 21 May 1917, and she was commissioned the same day as USS George P. Squires (SP-303).

Assigned to the 5th Naval District, George P. Squires served as a harbor patrol boat at Norfolk, Virginia. In addition, she swept for naval mines in the defensive sea area of Chesapeake Bay and patrolled the Virginia coast off Cape Henry.

George P. Squires was decommissioned at Norfolk on 27 July 1918 and was sold to James Dietrich of New York City on 23 October 1918.
