= USS Henry County =

USS Henry County may refer to:

- USS Henry County (IX-34), was commissioned in May 1930 and decommissioned August 1930 and then loaned to the State of California
- USS Henry County (LST-824), was a landing ship tank commissioned as LST-824 in November 1944, renamed Henry County in July 1955 and transferred to Malaysia in April 1975
