= USS Halibut =

USS Halibut has been the name of more than one United States Navy ship, and may refer to:

- USS Halibut (SS-232), a submarine in commission from 1942 to 1945
- USS Halibut (SSGN-587), later SSN-587, a submarine in commission from 1960 to 1976
