= USS George =

USS George has been the name of two ships in the United States Navy.

- USS George (DE-276), was assigned to the UK under the Lend-Lease program in June 1943; commissioned as HMS Goodson, 9 October 1943
- USS George (DE-697), a Buckley-class destroyer escort launched 14 August 1943; served until 1958
