= USS Hobcaw =

Patrol vessel of the United States Navy

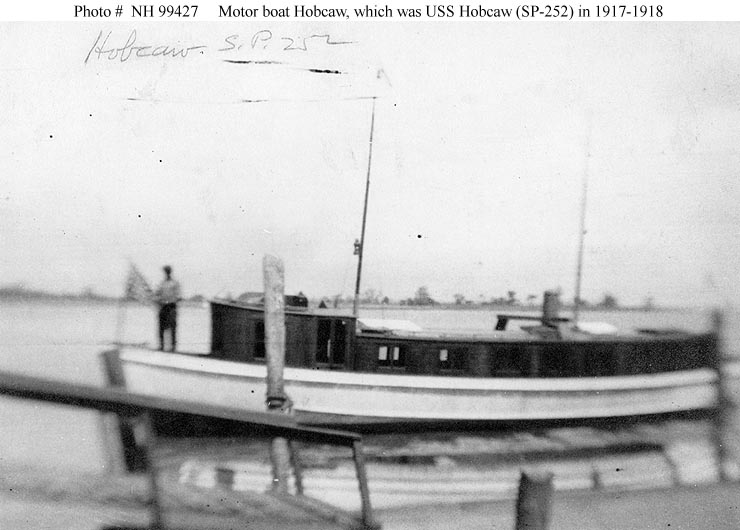
- Hobcaw as a civilian motorboat sometime between 1907 and 1917, prior to her U.S. Navy service.

History

United States
- Name: USS Hobcaw
- Namesake: Previous name retained
- Builder: L. B. Newman, Long Branch, New Jersey
- Completed: 1907
- Acquired: 27 August 1917
- Commissioned: 10 September 1917
- Fate: Returned to owner 18 November 1918
- Notes: Operated as civilian motorboat Hobcaw 1907-1917 and from November 1918

General characteristics
- Type: Patrol vessel, towing boat, and ferryboat
- Displacement: 19 tons
- Length: 52 ft 6 in (16.00 m)
- Beam: 12 ft 6 in (3.81 m)
- Draft: 2 ft 6 in (0.76 m) mean
- Speed: 8 knots
- Armament: 1 × 1-pounder gun

USS Hobcaw (SP-252) was a United States Navy patrol vessel, towing boat, and ferryboat in commission from 1917 to 1918.

Hobcaw was built as a civilian motorboat of the same name in 1907 by L. B. Newman at Long Branch, New Jersey. The U.S. Navy acquired her from her owner, B. M. Baruche of New York City, on 27 August 1917 for World War I service as a patrol vessel. She was commissioned as USS Hobcaw (SP-252) on 10 September 1917 at Georgetown, South Carolina.

Assigned to the 6th Naval District and based at Charleston, South Carolina, for section patrol duties, Hobcaw performed harbor patrol in Winyah Bay on the South Carolina coast until transferred to Marine Corps Recruit Depot Parris Island at Parris Island, South Carolina. Arriving there on 1 August 1918, Hobcaw acted as a towing boat and carried passengers until entering the Charleston Navy Yard at Charleston for repairs on 19 September 1918.

On week after the end of World War I, Hobcaw was returned to Baruche on 18 November 1918.
