= USS Gary =

USS Gary may refer to:

- USS Gary (DE-61), a destroyer escort, launched in 1943, transferred to the Royal Navy and renamed HMS Duckworth, and scrapped in 1946
- USS Thomas J. Gary (DE-326), a destroyer escort commissioned in 1943, renamed in 1945 to free up the name for the planned light cruiser and transferred to Tunisia in 1973
- USS Gary (CL-147), scheduled to be a light cruiser, but canceled prior to construction in 1945
- USS Gary (FFG-51), a frigate, commissioned in 1984, decommissioned in 2015; subsequently transferred to Taiwan and renamed ROCS Feng Chia
