= USS Gloria Dalton =

Patrol vessel of the United States Navy

History

United States
- Builder: Craig Shipbuilding
- Laid down: 1925
- Acquired: 11 May 1942
- Commissioned: 30 May 1942
- Decommissioned: 1 October 1943
- Stricken: 28 June 1944
- Fate: Returned to owner

General characteristics
- Displacement: 86 tons
- Length: 87 ft (27 m)
- Beam: 21 ft (6.4 m)

USS Gloria Dalton (IX-70), an unclassified miscellaneous vessel, was the only ship of the United States Navy to be given that name. Her keel was laid down in 1925 by Craig Shipbuilding Company, in Long Beach, California. She was purchased by the Navy 11 May 1942 and commissioned on 30 May 1942.

Gloria Dalton performed coastal patrol duties from her home port San Diego, under the Commandant, 11th Naval District, until 16 November 1942, then under Commander, Western Sea Frontier. She was laid up and decommissioned because of a need for extensive repairs 1 October 1943, struck from the Naval Vessel Register on 28 June 1944, and was transferred to the War Shipping Administration for disposal. She was eventually returned to her owner.

After extensive remodeling, repairs and decorating the 107-ft schooner Gloria Dalton was launched from Newport Harbor on 8 December 1953. The boat was purchased from William Roberts of Newport Beach California by L.E. Strickland, San Gabriel California and C.H. Otterman of Pasadena California.
