= USS Hector =

USS Hector may refer to the following ships of the United States Navy:

- USS Hector (1883), was formerly Pedro, built in 1883. Taken as a prize during the Spanish–American War, she was commissioned on 22 June 1898. From 10 to 20 July Hector made a patrol out of Key West up the Gulf of Mexico to Tampa and back to Key West. She sailed for Boston on 24 July and arrived there a week later. Hector decommissioned at Boston on 17 September 1898 and was sold on 10 October 1899.
- USS Hector (AC-7), was launched in July 1909 and wrecked off the Atlantic coast 14 July 1916
- USS Hector (AR-7), launched in November 1942 and struck from the Naval Vessel Register in July 1994
