= USS Guadalcanal =

Two ships of the United States Navy have been named USS Guadalcanal, after the epic Battle of Guadalcanal in the Solomon Islands during World War II.

- The first USS Guadalcanal (CVE-60) was an escort carrier in service from 1943 to 1946.
- The second USS Guadalcanal (LPH-7) was an Iwo Jima-class amphibious assault ship in service from 1963 to 1994.
