= USS Greyhound (SP-437) =

Patrol vessel of the United States Navy

History

United States
- Name: USS Greyhound
- Namesake: Previous name retained
- Builder: Great Lakes Boatbuilding Corporation, Milwaukee, Wisconsin
- Completed: 1916
- Acquired: 20 June 1917
- Fate: Sold 2 July 1919
- Notes: Operated as private motorboat Greyhound 1916-1917

General characteristics
- Type: Patrol vessel
- Tonnage: 135 gross register tons
- Length: 40 ft (12 m)
- Beam: 9 ft (2.7 m)
- Draft: 2 ft 3 in (0.69 m)
- Speed: 18 knots
- Armament: 1 × 1-pounder gun

The second USS Greyhound (SP-437) was a United States Navy patrol vessel in commission from 1917 to 1919.

Greyhound was built in 1916 as a private motorboat of the same name by the Great Lakes Boatbuilding Corporation at Milwaukee, Wisconsin. On 20 June 1917, the U.S. Navy purchased Greyhound at Key West, Florida, from Mrs. Ida W. Seybert for use as a section patrol vessel during World War I. She was commissioned as USS Greyhound (SP-437).

Assigned to the 7th Naval District, Greyhound served on patrol duty in Florida waters at Tampa Bay and in Key West Harbor for the remainder of World War I and into 1919.

Decommissioned after World War I, Greyhound was sold on 2 July 1919.
