= USS Hazelwood =

Two ships of the United States Navy have borne the name USS Hazelwood, named in honor of Commodore John Hazelwood, an officer in the Continental Navy.

- USS Hazelwood (DD-107), was a Wickes-class destroyer, commissioned in 1918 and scrapped in 1930
- USS Hazelwood (DD-531), was a Fletcher-class destroyer, commissioned in 1943 and struck in 1974
