= USS Groton =

USS Groton may refer to the following ships of the United States Navy:

- USS Groton (PF-29), was commissioned 5 September 1944 and sold to the Government of Colombia on 26 March 1947, where she served as Almirante Padilla
- USS Groton (PCE-900), was laid down as PCE-900 on 11 January 1943. She was named Groton on 15 February 1956 and was struck from the Navy List 1 February 1960
- USS Groton (SSN-694), was commissioned 8 July 1978 and was struck from the Navy List on 7 November 1997
- USS Groton (SSBN-828), announced in 2025
