= USS Despatch (1902) =

Ferry launch of the U.S. Navy

History

United States
- Name: USS Steam Cutter No. 423 (1902-1908); USS Despatch (1908-1918); USS Hustle (1918-1921)
- Namesake: Despatch: As a verb, to send off or away, to dispose of speedily, to execute quickly. As a noun, a message sent with speed.
- Commissioned: 1902
- Decommissioned: 1921
- Reclassified: YFB-6 in 1921

General characteristics
- Type: Ferry launch
- Length: 66 ft (20 m)
- Propulsion: Steam engine

The fourth USS Despatch, originally USS Steam Cutter No. 423, later USS Hustle (YFB-6), was a ferry launch that served in the United States Navy from 1902 to 1921.

Steam Cutter No. 423 was a steam-powered wooden-hulled ferry launch placed in service at the Naval Training Station, Newport, Rhode Island, in 1902. In 1908 she was renamed USS Despatch and on 11 April 1918 USS Hustle. Hustle was designated YFB-6 in 1921.

Hustle was taken out of service in 1921, having spent her entire Navy career at Newport.
