= USS Hydraulic =

Patrol vessel of the United States Navy

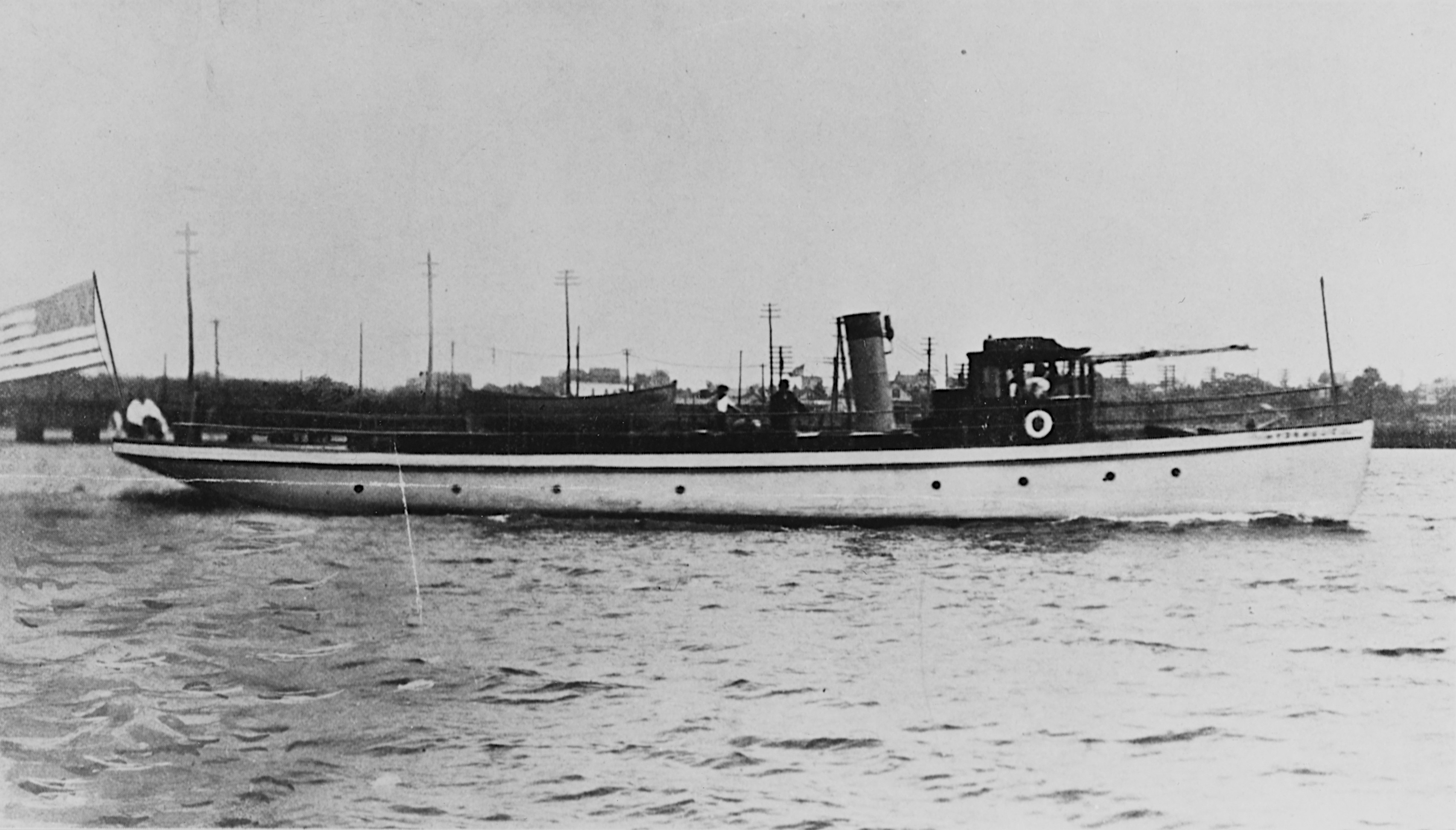
- Hydraulic in commercial service as a private charter vessel, before World War I.

History

United States
- Name: USS Hydraulic
- Namesake: Previous name retained
- Builder: A. C. Brown Shipbuilding Company, Tottenville, Staten Island, New York
- Completed: 1900
- Acquired: 29 May 1918
- Commissioned: 17 August 1918
- Fate: Returned to owner 23 January 1919

General characteristics
- Type: Patrol vessel
- Tonnage: 30 Gross register tons
- Length: 83 ft 6 in (25.45 m)
- Beam: 11 ft 6 in (3.51 m)
- Draft: 5 ft 6 in (1.68 m)
- Propulsion: One 200-indicated horsepower (149-kilowatt) steam engine, one shaft
- Speed: 13 knots
- Capacity: 60 passengers (civilian)
- Crew: 4 (civilian)
- Armament: 1 × 1-pounder gun

USS Hydraulic (SP-2584) was a United States Navy patrol vessel in commission from 1918 to 1919.

Hydraulic was built in 1900 as a steam yacht by the A. C. Brown Shipbuilding Company at Tottenville on Staten Island, New York. On 29 May 1918, the U.S. Navy acquired Hydraulic under a bareboat charter from her owner, Max Zickel of Hoboken, New Jersey, for use as a section patrol boat during World War I. She was commissioned as USS Hydraulic (SP-2584) on 17 August 1918.

Assigned to the 3rd Naval District, Hydraulic served in New York Harbor for the rest of World War I. Her duties included patrolling, the transportation of passengers, and relieving port guards on neutral ships in the harbor.

The Navy returned Hydraulic to Zickel on 23 January 1919.
