= USS Gallatin =

USS Gallatin is a name used more than once by the U.S. Navy:

- USS Gallatin (1807), was a cutter used by the Navy during the War of 1812
- USS Gallatin (APA-169), was an attack transport commissioned 15 November 1944
