= USS Helori =

Patrol vessel of the United States Navy

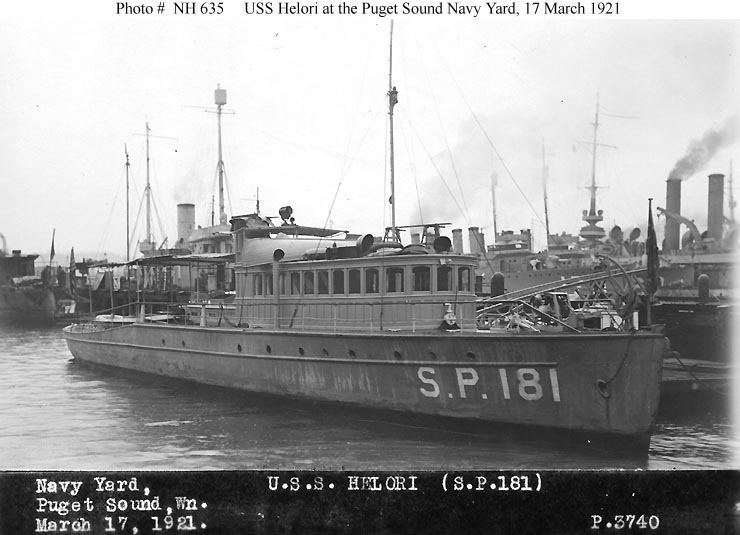
- USS Helori at Puget Sound Navy Yard, Bremerton, Washington on 17 March 1921. Her designation had been changed to YP-181 in 1920, but she still is painted with her previous designation, SP-181.

History

United States
- Name: USS Helori
- Namesake: Previous name retained
- Builder: Johnson Brothers and Blanchard, Seattle, Washington
- Completed: 1911
- Acquired: 23 April 1917
- Commissioned: 21 May 1917
- Decommissioned: March 1922
- Reclassified: From section patrol craft (SP-181) to district patrol craft (YP-181) in 1920
- Fate: Sold 17 September 1925
- Notes: Operated as civilian motorboat Helori 1911-1917

General characteristics
- Type: Patrol vessel
- Displacement: 90 tons
- Length: 92 ft 4 in (28.14 m)
- Beam: 15 ft 8 in (4.78 m)
- Draft: 5 ft 6 in (1.68 m)
- Installed power: 200 horsepower (0.3 megawatt)
- Propulsion: One standard gasoline engine, one shaft
- Speed: 12 knots
- Armament: 2 × 6-pounder guns

USS Helori (SP-181), later YP-181, was an armed motorboat that served in the United States Navy as a patrol vessel from 1917 to 1922.

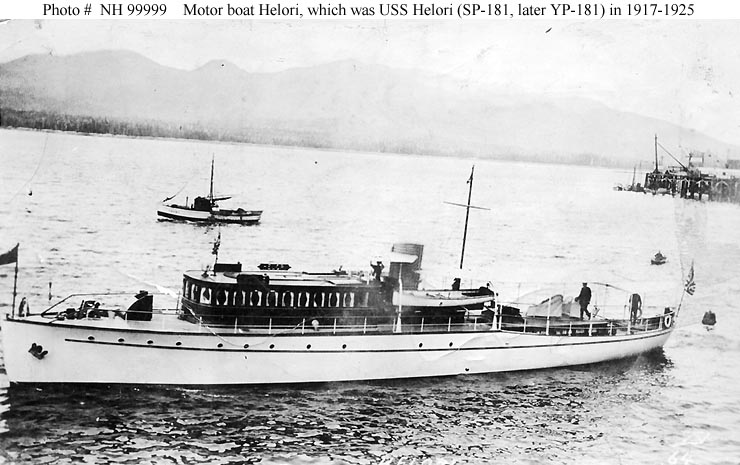
Helori as a private motorboat in a Pacific Northwest harbor sometime between 1911 and 1917.

Helori was built as a civilian motorboat of the same name in 1911 by Johnson Brothers and Blanchard at Seattle, Washington, for use as a pleasure craft. The U.S. Navy purchased her from her owner, either Omar J. Humphrey or H. G. Kenney of Seattle, on 23 April 1917 for World War I service as a patrol vessel. She was commissioned as USS Helori (SP-181) on 21 May 1917 at Puget Sound Navy Yard, Bremerton, Washington.

Assigned to the 13th Naval District, Helori was the only section patrol boat on the United States West Coast fitted with the 220-horsepower (0.3-megawatt) standard gasoline engine adopted for use in World War I submarine chasers, and she operated out of Puget Sound Navy Yard training engine room crews for submarine chasers and performing guardship duty. She made frequent trips to and from Bremerton and Seattle.

In 1920, Helori was reclassified from section patrol craft to district patrol craft and was redesignated YP-181

Helori was decommissioned in March 1922 and sold to the Crowley Launch and Tugboat Company of San Francisco, California, on 17 September 1925.
