= USS Guinevere =

USS Guinevere has been the name of more than one United States Navy ship, and may refer to:

- USS Guinevere (SP-512), a patrol vessel commissioned in 1917 and wrecked in 1918
- USS Guinevere (IX-67), a patrol vessel in commission from 1942 to 1945
