= USS Hollyhock =

Tugboat of the United States Navy

History

United States
- Acquired: 5 March 1863
- Fate: Sold, 5 October 1865

General characteristics
- Displacement: 352 tons
- Length: 135 ft (41 m)
- Beam: 26 ft 9 in (8.15 m)
- Depth of hold: 11 ft (3.4 m)
- Propulsion: steam engine; side wheel-propelled
- Speed: 14 knots (26 km/h; 16 mph)
- Armament: one 20-1/2 pounder gun; one 12-pounder howitzer

USS Hollyhock was a steamship acquired by the Union Navy during the American Civil War. She was placed into service as a tugboat and as a ship’s tender and assigned to support the fleet blockading the ports of the Confederate States of America.

== Service history ==
Reliance was a sidewheel steamer purchased by Rear Admiral David Farragut at New Orleans, Louisiana, 5 March 1863, to tow supplies upriver. She was present below Port Hudson, Louisiana, in early March as Farragut prepared for his gallant passage of the batteries 14 March, and was subsequently sent to Berwick Bay, Louisiana, to take part in the relentless pressure of the blockade which strangled the South. She was renamed Hollyhock in June or July 1863, and for nearly 2 years she served as a ship's tender and supply ship based at New Orleans, Louisiana. On this vital service she plied the river from New Orleans to the mouth.

Hollyhock did participate, however, in one of the most daring episodes of the war, the escape of the Confederate ram under Lt. Charles W. Read from the Red River. Read's ship, William. H. Webb, ran the blockade of the mouth of the Red River 23 April, and sped toward New Orleans and the Gulf of Mexico, eventually hoping to make Havana, Cuba. As William H. Webb passed New Orleans, all available ships including Hollyhock gave chase. The fleeing Webb finally encountered Richmond, sent upriver to stop her, and ran aground on the bank to avoid capture. Hollyhock continued to serve at New Orleans until she was sold there to Mr. P. Bennett 5 October 1865.
