= USS Griswold =

USS Griswold may refer to the following ships of the United States Navy:

- USS Griswold (SP-3138), a wooden ferryboat, was built in 1899, taken over by the US Navy on 12 August 1918, and returned to her owner 20 June 1919
- USS Griswold (DE-7), was launched and commissioned on 28 April 1943 and sold for scrapping 27 November 1946
