= USS Gates =

USS Gates may refer to the following ships of the United States Navy:

- USS Gates (1776), a galley built in 1776 and scuttled in 1777 to prevent capture by British forces
- USS Thomas S. Gates, a cruiser launched 14 December 1985 and decommissioned 15 December 2005
