= USS Hunt =

USS Hunt may refer to:

- USS Hunt (DD-194), a Clemson-class destroyer, commissioned in 1919 and decommissioned in 1922. She served in the United States Coast Guard from 1930 to 1934. She was recommissioned in 1940, transferred to the Royal Navy as HMS Broadway, served in World War II and scrapped in 1945
- USS Hunt (DD-674), a Fletcher-class destroyer, commissioned in 1943, served in World War II and decommissioned in 1963
