= USS Galveston =

USS Galveston may refer to the following ships of the United States Navy:

- USS Galveston (CL-19) was a cruiser in service from 1905 to 1930
- USS Galveston (CLG-3), originally CL-93, was a guided missile cruiser in service from 1958 to 1970

== See also ==
- USRC Galveston, launched in 1891, renamed Apache in 1900, and in service until 1950
- USCGC Galveston Island (WPB-1349), commissioned in 1992
