= USS Green Dragon =

Patrol vessel of the United States Navy

History

United States
- Name: USS Green Dragon
- Namesake: Previous name retained
- Builder: J. Smith, Port Washington, New York
- Completed: 1901
- Acquired: 19 July 1917
- Commissioned: 1917
- Fate: Sold 25 February 1922
- Notes: Operated as private motorboat Green Dragon 1901-1917

General characteristics
- Type: Patrol vessel
- Tonnage: 17 Gross register tons
- Length: 60 ft (18 m)
- Beam: 10 ft 3 in (3.12 m)
- Draft: 4 ft 2 in (1.27 m)
- Speed: 10 knots
- Armament: 1 × 1-pounder gun; 1 × machine gun

USS Green Dragon (SP-742) was a United States Navy patrol vessel commissioned in 1917 that served during World War I.

Green Dragon was built in 1901 as a private motorboat of the same name by J. Smith at Port Washington on Long Island, New York. On 19 July 1917, the U.S. Navy acquired her from her owner, Edward German of Newport, Rhode Island, for use as a section patrol vessel during World War I. She was commissioned as USS Green Dragon (SP-742) in 1917.

Assigned to the 2nd Naval District in southern New England, Green Dragon patrolled the coast of the United States from Chatham, Massachusetts, to New London, Connecticut, for the rest of World War I.

Green Dragon was sold to George E. Clement & Son of Philadelphia, Pennsylvania, on 25 February 1922.
