= USS Gloucester =

USS Gloucester has been the name of two ships in the United States Navy.

- USS Gloucester (1891), a gunboat built in 1891 that served during the Spanish–American War
- USS Gloucester (PF-22), a Tacoma-class frigate launched in 1943
