= USS Gladiola =

Patrol vessel of the United States Navy

History

United States
- Name: USS Gladiola
- Namesake: The gladiolus, a flowering plant often called the gladiola (previous name retained)
- Builder: Hudson Yacht and Building Company, Nyack, New York
- Completed: 1911
- Acquired: 17 April 1917
- Commissioned: 1 May 1917
- Decommissioned: 25 February 1919
- Fate: Returned to owner 25 February 1919
- Notes: Operated as civilian yacht Gladiola 1911-1917 and from 1919

General characteristics
- Type: Patrol vessel
- Tonnage: 43 tons
- Length: 68 ft 8 in (20.93 m)
- Beam: 14 ft 5 in (4.39 m)
- Draft: 2 ft 7 in (0.79 m)
- Propulsion: Steam engine
- Speed: 10 knots
- Armament: 1 × 1-pounder gun; 1 × machine gun

USS Gladiola (SP-184) was an armed yacht that served in the United States Navy as a patrol vessel from 1917 to 1919.

Gladiola was built as a civilian motor yacht of the same name in 1911 by Hudson Yacht and Building Company at Nyack, New York. The U.S. Navy acquired her from her owner, Coburn Haskell, on 17 April 1917 for World War I service as a patrol vessel. She was commissioned as USS Gladiola (SP-184) on 1 May 1917.

Gladiola was placed under the operational control of the 5th Naval District and served in the Norfolk-Hampton Roads, Virginia, area as a naval port guard craft and as a customs boat.

Gladiola was decommissioned and simultaneously returned to her owner on 25 February 1919.
