= USS George H. Bradley =

Patrol vessel of the United States Navy

History

United States
- Name: USS George H. Bradley
- Namesake: Previous name retained
- Completed: 1871
- Acquired: 18 May 1917
- Commissioned: 18 May 1917
- Stricken: 6 May 1919
- Fate: Sold 6 May 1919
- Notes: Operated as commercial steamer George H. Bradley 1871-1917 and from 1919

General characteristics
- Type: Patrol vessel (1917-1918); Minesweeper (1918-1919)
- Tonnage: 99 gross register tons
- Length: 104 ft (32 m)
- Beam: 19 ft (5.8 m)
- Draft: 10 ft (3.0 m)
- Propulsion: Steam engine
- Speed: 9 knots
- Complement: 26
- Armament: 1 × 1-pounder gun

USS George H. Bradley (SP-327) was a patrol vessel and minesweeper that served in the United States Navy from 1917 to 1919.

George H. Bradley was built as a wooden commercial steamer of the same name in 1871 at Bath, Maine. On 18 May 1917, the U.S. Navy purchased her from her owner, Captain Ocran Humphries of Reedville, Virginia, for use as a patrol vessel during World War I. She was commissioned as USS George H. Bradley (SP-327) the same day at Norfolk, Virginia.

Assigned to the 5th Naval District and based at Norfolk, George H. Bradley performed local patrol duties in the Norfolk area until 19 March 1918. She then was fitted with minesweeping gear and took on patrol and minesweeping duties between Cape Henry, Virginia, and Sea Basque. On 13 June 1918 she joined the minesweeping squadron in the Chesapeake Bay and swept the waters from Norfolk Gate to Baltimore Gate for the rest of World War I.

George J. Bradley was stricken from the Navy List on 6 May 1919 and sold back to Captain Humphries the same day.
