= USS Honolulu (ID-1843) =

Cargo ship of the United States Navy

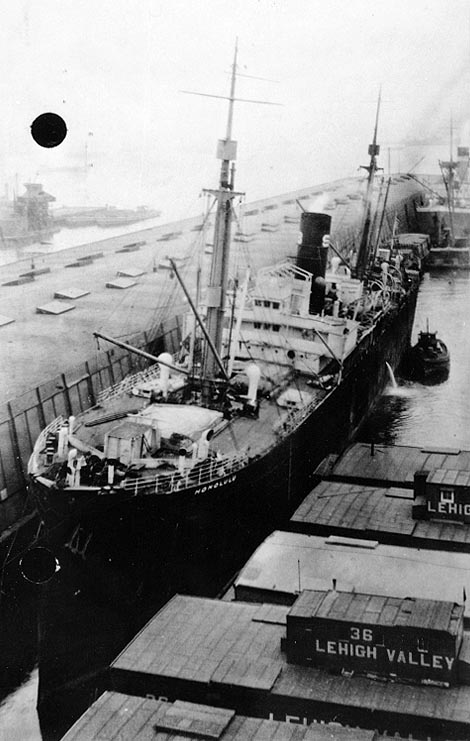
- SS Honolulu ca. 1918, prior to her U.S. Navy service as USS Honolulu

History

United States
- Name: USS Honolulu
- Namesake: Honolulu, capital city of what was then the Territory of Hawaii (previous name retained)
- Builder: Armstrong Whitworth Ltd., Newcastle upon Tyne, England
- Launched: 19 June 1905
- Completed: 1905
- Acquired: 12 June 1917 by U.S. Government; Possibly July 1918 by U.S. Navy
- Commissioned: Possibly 26 July 1918
- Decommissioned: Possibly March 1919
- Fate: Returned to United States Shipping Board; Sold 26 January 1920
- Notes: In commercial service as German SS Setos from 1905 to 1914, and SS Itasca 1917; In Shipping Board custody and United States Army service as SS Honolulu 1917-1918; In commercial service from 1920 as SS Honolulu and SS Commercial Trader

General characteristics
- Type: Cargo ship
- Displacement: 4,902 tons
- Length: 412 ft 0 in (125.58 m)
- Beam: 51 ft 0 in (15.54 m)
- Draft: 25 ft 3 in (7.70 m) mean
- Speed: 12 knots
- Armament: 1 × 5-inch (127-millimeter) gun; 1 × 3-inch (76.2-millimeter) gun

The first USS Honolulu (ID-1843) was a cargo ship that served in the United States Navy probably from 1918 to 1919.

Honolulu was built as SS Setos by Armstrong Whitworth Ltd., Newcastle upon Tyne, England, in 1905 on Order of the Deutsche Dampfschiffahrts-Gesellschaft Kosmos, a shipping company with lines from Germany to the west coast of South and North America. 1914 she searched for shelter at Honolulu.

She was taken over by the United States for World War I on 12 June 1917, transferred to United States Shipping Board ownership, renamed Itasca and assigned to United States Army service. Although she operated as a U.S. cargo transport with a U.S. Navy crew, there is no record of her commissioning. Her name was changed to Honolulu on 26 July 1918.

Honolulu's service included cargo cruises between the United States and various French ports.

U.S. Navy personnel were released from the ship in March 1919 and she was rejected for further U.S. Navy service on 2 April 1919. Honolulu was returned to the United States Shipping Board and sold on 26 January 1920.

Honolulu resumed commercial service, and was sold 1923 to Moore-McCormack. Renamed Commercial Trader she was assigned to their Gulf Line until 1934 scrapped. The Company used more ex-German ships. One was Commercial Pathfinder ex Osage ex German Serapis, a sistership of Setos, between 1920 and 1928 too in service of their Gulf Line, which 1914 stayed at San Francisco.
