= USS Hyman G. Rickover =

Two ships of the United States Navy have been named USS Hyman G. Rickover, after Admiral Hyman G. Rickover, known as the "Father of the Nuclear Navy".

- USS Hyman G. Rickover (SSN-709), was a Los Angeles-class submarine commissioned in 1984 and decommissioned in 2006
- USS Hyman G. Rickover (SSN-795), is a Virginia-class submarine commissioned in October 2023
