= USS Gamma =

Tugboat of the United States Navy

History

United States
- Name: USS Gamma
- Ordered: as R. F. Loper
- Laid down: date unknown
- Launched: 1863
- Acquired: 3 June 1864
- Commissioned: 1864
- Decommissioned: 1865
- Stricken: 1865 (est.)
- Fate: Sold, 25 October 1865

General characteristics
- Displacement: 36 tons
- Length: 65 ft (20 m)
- Beam: 14 ft (4.3 m)
- Draught: depth of hold 6 ft (1.8 m)
- Propulsion: steam engine; screw-propelled
- Speed: 12 knots
- Complement: not known
- Armament: eight Enfield rifles; one spar torpedo

USS Gamma was a small steamer acquired by the Union Navy during close of the American Civil War.

She was employed by the Navy as a tugboat and, since she carried a spar torpedo, as a torpedo boat, capable of ramming and sinking another ship with her explosive torpedo.

== Constructed as a tugboat in 1863 ==
Gamma was built in 1863 as steamer R. F. Loper at Philadelphia, Pennsylvania.; purchased there 3 June 1864; renamed Gamma, but was also called Tug Number 3 and Picket Boat Number 3.

== Assigned to the James River ==
Gamma was assigned as a picket boat in the James River. She arrived at New Bern, North Carolina, from the James River 3 April 1865.

Placed at the disposal of General William Tecumseh Sherman's quartermaster, she served in the sounds of North Carolina until close of the Civil War.

== Post-war decommissioning, sale, and subsequent career ==
She was sold by public auction at New York City 25 October 1865 to D. Trundy. Redocumented as merchant steamer Peter Smith 13 December 1865, she burned at New York City 9 May 1893.
