= USS Glance =

Tugboat of the United States Navy

History

United States
- Ordered: as Glide
- Laid down: date unknown
- Launched: 1863
- Acquired: 2 June 1864
- In service: c. 2 June 1864
- Out of service: 27 September 1883
- Stricken: 1883 (est.)
- Homeport: Hampton Roads, Virginia; Philadelphia, Pennsylvania
- Fate: Sold, 27 September 1883

General characteristics
- Displacement: 81 tons
- Length: 75 ft (23 m)
- Beam: 17 ft (5.2 m)
- Draught: 8 ft (2.4 m)
- Propulsion: steam engine; stern wheel-propelled
- Speed: 8 knots
- Complement: not known
- Armament: not known

USS Glance was a steamship acquired by the Union Navy during the American Civil War. She was used as a tugboat in Virginia by the Navy during the war, after which she was stationed in Philadelphia, Pennsylvania, where she provided tug services until sold in 1883.

== Constructed in Philadelphia in 1863 ==
Glance was built in 1863 as the merchant tug Glide by Reaney, Son & Archbold, Chester, Pennsylvania; purchased by Rear Admiral S. H. Stringham at Boston, Massachusetts, 2 June 1864, and placed under command of Acting Ensign H. Wheeler.

== Assigned to Hampton Roads ==
Glance arrived at Hampton Roads, Virginia, on 20 July 1864 for service as yard tug until 13 July 1865, when ordered to Philadelphia for identical duty. She continued yard tug duties at Philadelphia until 27 September 1883.

== Decommissioning and sale ==
She was sold on that date to Mr. W. H. Swift, Boston, Massachusetts.
