= USS Hopestill =

Patrol vessel of the United States Navy

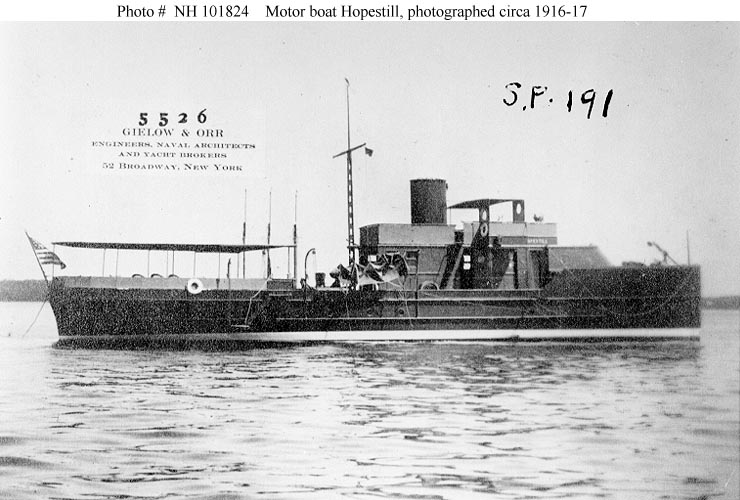
- Hopestill in private use in 1916 or 1917, prior to her U.S. Navy service.

History

United States
- Name: USS Hopestill
- Namesake: Previous name retained
- Builder: Robert Jacobs, City Island, the Bronx, New York
- Completed: 1916
- Acquired: May 1917
- Commissioned: 26 July 1917
- Decommissioned: July 1919
- Stricken: 21 August 1919
- Fate: Sold 16 September 1919
- Notes: Built as civilian motorboat or motor yacht Hopestill

General characteristics
- Type: Patrol vessel and medical transport vessel
- Displacement: 83 long tons (84 t)
- Length: 89 ft (27 m)
- Beam: 16 ft (4.9 m)
- Draft: 5 ft (1.5 m)
- Speed: 13 kn (15 mph; 24 km/h)
- Armament: 1 × 3-pounder, 2 × 1-pounders

USS Hopestill (SP-191) was a United States Navy patrol vessel in commission from 1917 to 1919.

Hopestill was built as a civilian motorboat or motor yacht of the same name in 1916 by Robert Jacobs at City Island in the Bronx, New York. The U.S. Navy acquired her from her owner, Irving E. Raymond of New York City, in May 1917 for World War I service as a patrol vessel. She was commissioned as USS Hopestill (SP-191) at the New York Navy Yard at Brooklyn, New York, on 26 July 1917.

Hopestill was assigned to the 3rd Naval District and served as a harbor patrol vessel in New York Harbor until 26 April 1918, when she was reassigned to the New York Naval Hospital. In her new role, Hopestill carried patients for the hospital and stood by to transport emergency cases from ships in the harbor.

Hopestill completed this duty in July 1919 and was decommissioned. She was stricken from the Naval Vessel Register on 21 August and sold to J. S. Milne of Brooklyn on 16 September.
