= USS Hawkbill =

USS Hawkbill has been the name of more than one United States Navy ship, and may refer to:

- USS Hawkbill (SS-366), a submarine in commission from 1944 to 1946
- USS Hawkbill (SSN-666), a submarine in commission from 1971 to 2000
