= USS Gallant =

USS Gallant may refer to the following ships of the United States Navy:

- USS Gallant (PYc-29), a coastal patrol yacht commissioned 15 April 1942 and decommissioned 22 January 1945
- USS Gallant (MSO-489), was an ocean minesweeper commissioned 14 September 1955 and decommissioned 29 April 1994
