= USS Galatea =

USS Galatea may refer to the following ships of the United States Navy:

- USS Galatea (1863), was purchased by the Navy 31 July 1863 and decommissioned 12 July 1865
- USS Galatea (SP-714), was purchased by the Navy 14 July 1917 and sold 20 December 1921
