= USS Hatak =

Tugboat of the United States Navy

History

United States
- Name: USS Hatak (YTB-219)
- Builder: Greenport Basin and Construction Company, Long Island, NY
- Launched: 22 July 1944
- Sponsored by: Mrs. B. L. Lea
- Acquired: 22 July 1944
- Stricken: 27 June 1957
- Fate: Sold, date unknown, to McAllister Towing and Transportation of New York, renamed Jane McAllister

General characteristics
- Class & type: Cahto-class district harbor tug
- Displacement: 410 long tons (417 t)
- Length: 110 ft 0 in (33.53 m)
- Beam: 27 ft 0 in (8.23 m)
- Draft: 11 ft 4 in (3.45 m)
- Speed: 12 knots (22 km/h; 14 mph)
- Complement: 12
- Armament: 2 × .50-caliber machine guns

Hatak (YTB-219), a wooden tug, was originally designated YT-219 and built by Greenport Basin and Construction Company, Long Island, New York; launched 22 July 1944, Mrs. B. L. Lea as sponsor; and placed in service as YTB-219, 18 December 1944.

== Service history ==
After fitting out at New York Navy Yard, Hatak proceeded to report to the 5th Naval District for duty in January 1945. She remained in the Norfolk area as a tugboat until struck from the Navy List 27 June 1957.
