= USS Guadalupe =

USS Guadalupe may refer to the following ships of the United States Navy:

- USS Guadalupe (AO-32), a United States Navy replenishment oiler in commission from 1941 to 1974
- USNS Guadalupe (T-AO-200), a United States Navy fleet replenishment oiler in service since 1992
