= USS Goodwill =

United States Navy Patrol vessel during World War I

History

United States
- Name: Goodwill
- Namesake: Previous name retained
- Acquired: 1917 or 1918
- Commissioned: 1917 or 1918
- Fate: Returned to owner 31 December 1918
- Notes: Operated as civilian motorboat Goodwill before Navy service and from December 1918

General characteristics
- Type: Patrol vessel
- Length: 26 ft 10 in (8.18 m)
- Beam: 9 ft (2.7 m)

USS Goodwill was a United States Navy patrol vessel in commission from 1917 or 1918 until the end of 1918.

Goodwill was built as a civilian motorboat of the same name in 1917. In 1917 or 1918, the U.S. Navy acquired her from her owner, the Panama Canal Company, for use as a section patrol boat during World War I. She never received a section patrol (SP) number, but she was commissioned as USS Goodwill.

Assigned to the 15th Naval District, Goodwill conducted shore and harbor patrols in the Panama Canal Zone for the rest of World War I. She was returned to the Panama Canal Company on 31 December 1918.
