= USS Grosbeak (1865) =

Gunboat of the United States Navy

History

United States
- Acquired: 3 February 1865
- Commissioned: 24 February 1865
- Decommissioned: circa 17 August 1865
- Fate: Sold, 17 August 1865

General characteristics
- Displacement: 196 tons
- Length: 164 ft (50 m)
- Beam: 28 ft (8.5 m)
- Depth of hold: 4 ft 6 in (1.37 m)
- Propulsion: steam engine; side wheel-propelled
- Armament: two 20-pounder Parrott rifles; two 30-pounder Parrott rifles; one 12-pounder smoothbore

USS Grosbeak was a steamship acquired by the Union Navy during the American Civil War.

Grosbeak was placed into service as a gunboat and assigned to the Union blockade of ports of the Confederate States of America.

== Service history ==
Fanny was a paddle steamer that operated on the Ohio and Mississippi rivers in the mid-1860s. She was purchased by the Union Navy on 3 February 1865 at Mound City, Illinois. She was renamed Grosbeak and was commissioned 24 February, Acting Master Thomas Burns in command. After brief duty in Kentucky with the iron-clad monitor squadron stationed there. Grosbeak joined the Mississippi squadron patrolling the Mississippi River from Cairo, Illinois, to the White River. When the river steamer Sultana caught fire and exploded off Memphis, Tennessee, 27 April 1865, Grosbeak rescued 60 to 80 survivors and transferred them to hospital. She also transported wounded men from boats further down the river to Memphis, Tennessee, for proper care. As the war ended, Grosbeak returned to Mound City and was sold there 17 August 1865, thereafter returning to civilian service. Her ultimate fate is unknown.
