= USS Huntsville =

USS Huntsville may refer to the following ships operated by the United States:

- USS Huntsville (1861), a Union Navy steamer during the American Civil War
- USNS Huntsville (T-AGM-7), a range tracking ship, converted in 1961
