= USS Helen Euphane =

Patrol vessel of the United States Navy

History

United States
- Name: USS Helen Euphane
- Namesake: Previous name retained
- Builder: E. J. Tull, Pocomoke City, Maryland
- Completed: 1902
- Acquired: Purchased 23 May 1917; Delivered 5 June 1917
- Fate: Sold 15 May 1919
- Notes: Operated as commercial fishing boat Helen Euphane 1902-1917 and from 1919

General characteristics
- Type: Patrol vessel and minesweeper
- Displacement: 178 tons
- Length: 120 ft (37 m)
- Beam: 20 ft 4 in (6.20 m)
- Draft: 7 ft 3 in (2.21 m) mean
- Speed: 10 knots
- Armament: 1 × 1-pounder gun

USS Helen Euphane (SP-403) was a United States Navy patrol vessel and minesweeper in commission from 1917 to 1919.

Helen Euphane was built as a commercial fishing boat of the same name in 1902 by E. J. Tull at Pocomoke City, Maryland. On 23 May 1917, the U.S. Navy purchased her from the Eubank Tankard Company of Kilmarnock, Virginia, for use as a section patrol vessel and minesweeper during World War I. The Eubank Tankard Company delivered her to the Navy on 5 June 1917. Her first commanding officer was Lieutenant, junior grade, Rowland G. Foster, USNRF.

Assigned to the 5th Naval District and based at Norfolk, Virginia, Helen Euphane operated as a patrol boat and minesweeper in Hampton Roads and the lower Chesapeake Bay for the remainder of World War I.

The Navy sold Helen Euphane back to the Eubank Tankard Company on 15 April 1919.
