= USS Glendoveer =

United States Navy vessel

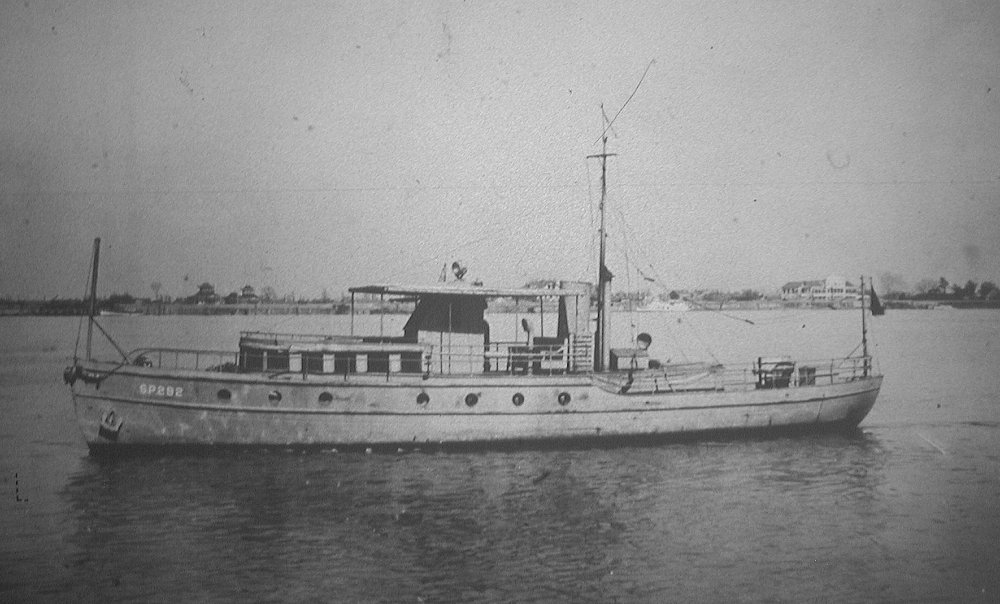
- USS Glendoveer while out of commission on 16 June 1919, the day before she was stricken from the Navy List.

History

United States
- Name: Glendoveer
- Namesake: Previous name retained
- Builder: Jahncke Navigation Company, New Orleans, Louisiana
- Completed: 1907
- Acquired: 3 May 1917
- Commissioned: 9 May 1917
- Decommissioned: 8 February 1919
- Stricken: 17 June 1919
- Fate: Sold 2 September 1919
- Notes: In civilian use as Glendoveer 1907–1917

General characteristics
- Type: Patrol vessel
- Tonnage: 33 tons
- Length: 74 ft (23 m)
- Beam: 12 ft (3.7 m)
- Draft: 4 ft 6 in (1.37 m)
- Speed: 12 knots
- Armament: 2 × 3-pounder guns

USS Glendoveer (SP-292) was a United States Navy patrol vessel in commission from 1917 to 1919.

Glendoveer was built as a civilian vessel of the same name in 1907 by the Jahncke Navigation Company at New Orleans, Louisiana. The U.S. Navy purchased her from her owner, Ernest L. Jahncke, on 3 May 1917 for World War I service as a patrol vessel. She was commissioned on 9 May 1917 as USS Glendoveer (SP-292).

Assigned to the 8th Naval District, Glendoveer served in Pensacola Harbor at Pensacola, Florida, at New Orleans, and at Biloxi, Mississippi, as a section patrol boat and inspection boat for merchant ships. She occasional also served as a mail boat and on rescue missions; she responded to a distress call from a seaplane lost in the fog off Pensacola on 14 February 1918 and succeeded in towing it into the safety of the harbor.

Glendoveer continued her patrolling duties until she was decommissioned on 8 February 1919 at New Orleans. She was stricken from the Navy List on 17 June 1919 and sold to Charles DeLerno on 2 September.

== Bibliography ==
- Silverstone, Paul H. (2006). The New Navy, 1883 – 1922. The U.S. Navy Warship Series. New York: Routledge. ISBN 0-415-97871-8.
