= USS George F. Pierce =

Cargo ship of the United States Navy

History

United States
- Name: USS George F. Pierce
- Namesake: Previous name retained
- Builder: William G. Abbott
- Completed: 1914
- Acquired: 1 February 1918
- Commissioned: 1918
- Decommissioned: 17 March 1922
- Fate: Sold 5 June 1922
- Notes: Served as commercial cargo ship SS George F. Pierce 1914-1918

General characteristics
- Type: Cargo ship
- Tonnage: 252 gross register tons
- Length: 121 ft 3 in (36.96 m)
- Beam: 24 ft (7.3 m)
- Draft: 8 ft 9 in (2.67 m)
- Propulsion: Steam engine
- Speed: 12 knots

USS George F. Pierce (ID-648), sometimes reported as SP-648, was a cargo ship that served in the United States Navy from 1918 to 1922.

George F. Pierce was built as the commercial wooden-hulled steam cargo and passenger ship SS George F. Pierce by William G. Abbott in 1914. In 1918, the U.S. Navy purchased her from the Milford and Philadelphia Freight Line Company of Philadelphia, Pennsylvania, for use during World War I and assigned her the naval registry identification number (Id. No.) 648. The Navy took delivery of her on 1 February 1918 at the Philadelphia Navy Yard, and she was commissioned as USS George F. Pierce (ID-648).

Assigned to the 4th Naval District, George F. Pierce served as a passenger ship and supply boat in the Philadelphia area for the next four years.

George F. Pierce was decommissioned on 17 March 1922. She was sold to L. N. Hearn of Milford, Delaware, on 5 June 1922.
