= USS Hatteras =

Two ships in the United States Navy have been named USS Hatteras for Hatteras Island or Hatteras Inlet on the coast of North Carolina, and a third ship that was cancelled prior to construction was also to have borne the name:

- USS Hatteras (1861), a steamer purchased in 1861, which served during the American Civil War and was sunk by CSS Alabama in January 1863
- USS Hatteras (ID-2142), purchased in 1917, served as a cargo ship during World War I, and decommissioned in 1919
- USS Hatteras (AVP-42), a Barnegat-class small seaplane tender that was canceled in 1943, prior to construction
