= USS Guardfish =

USS Guardfish has been the name of more than one United States Navy ship, and may refer to:

- USS Guardfish (SS-217), a submarine in commission from 1942 to 1946
- USS Guardfish (SSN-612), a submarine in commission from 1966 to 1992
