= USS Hyac =

Patrol vessel of the United States Navy

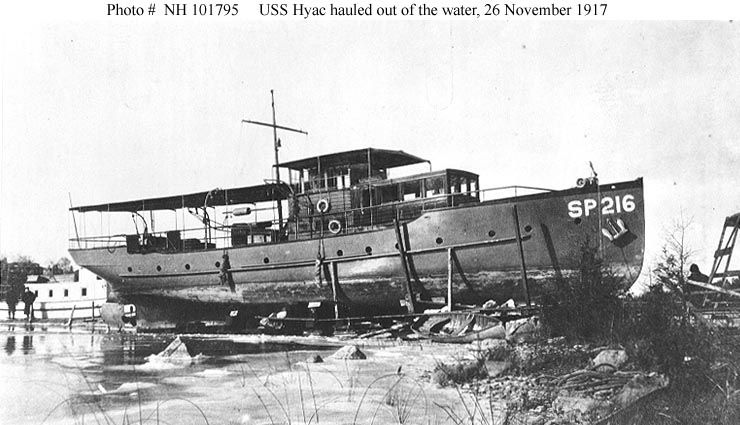
- USS Hyac on 26 November 1917, hauled out of the water on a marine railway, probably for winter lay-up.

History

United States
- Name: USS Hyac
- Namesake: Previous name retained
- Builder: Weckler Boat Company, Chicago, Illinois
- Completed: 1915
- Acquired: 1917
- Commissioned: 5 July 1917
- Fate: Returned to owner 26 November 1918
- Notes: Operated as civilian motorboat Hyac 1915-1917 and from November 1918

General characteristics
- Type: Patrol vessel
- Displacement: 48 tons
- Length: 75 ft 4 in (22.96 m)
- Beam: 14 ft 5 in (4.39 m)
- Draft: 5 ft (1.5 m)
- Speed: 10 knots

USS Hyac (SP-216) was a United States Navy patrol vessel in commission from 1917 to 1918.

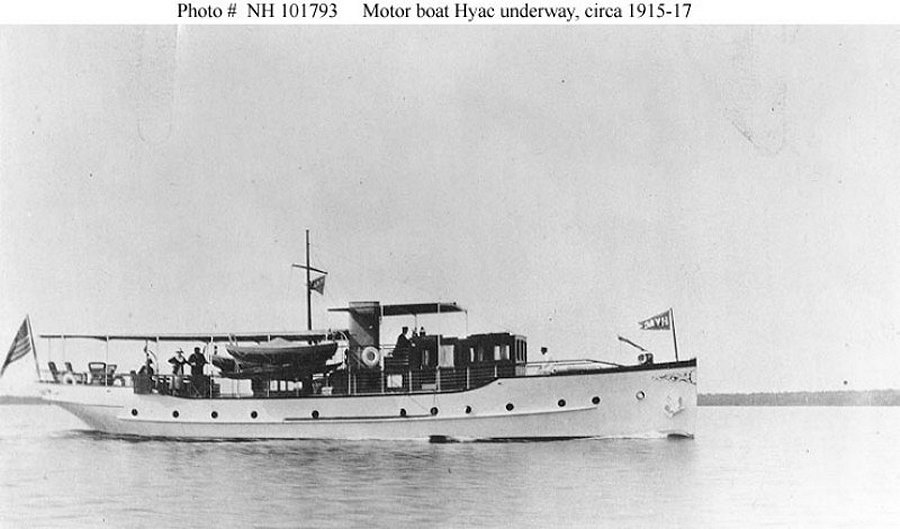
Hyac on the Great Lakes as a civilian motorboat sometime between 1915 and 1917, prior to her U.S. Navy service. She flies a pennant bearing her name at her bow.

Hyac was built as a civilian motorboat of the same name in 1915 by the Weckler Boat Company at Chicago, Illinois. The U.S. Navy acquired her from her owner, W. M. Derby of Chicago, in 1917 for World War I service as a patrol vessel. She was commissioned as USS Hyac (SP-216) on 5 July 1917.

Based at Chicago and assigned to the "9th, 10th, and 11th Naval Districts"—at the time a single administrative entity made up of the 9th Naval District, 10th Naval District, and 11th Naval District -- Hyac served as a patrol boat on the Great Lakes between Chicago and Sault Ste. Marie, Michigan, during World War I.

Following the end of the war, Hyac was returned to her owner on 26 November 1918.
