= USS Grackle =

List of ships with the same or similar names

USS Grackle is a name used more than once by the U.S. Navy:

- USS Grackle (AM-73), was launched in 1919 by the Bath Iron Works, Bath, Maine
- USS Grackle (AMS-13), was launched 9 November 1943 by Henry B. Nevins, Inc., City Island, New York
- Grackle (AM-396), was under construction when her contract was terminated 12 August 1945
