= USS Hunch =

Patrol vessel of the United States Navy

History

United States
- Name: USS Hunch
- Namesake: Previous name retained
- Builder: Charles L. Seabury Company and Gas Engine and Power Company, Morris Heights, the Bronx, New York
- Completed: 1907
- Acquired: August 1917
- Commissioned: 1917
- Fate: Returned to owner 1917 or 1918
- Notes: Operated as private motorboat Hunch 1907-1917 and from 1917 or 1918

General characteristics
- Type: Patrol vessel
- Length: 35 ft 2 in (10.72 m)
- Beam: 6 ft 3 in (1.91 m)
- Draft: 2 ft 6 in (0.76 m)
- Speed: 20 knots

USS Hunch (SP-1197) was a United States Navy patrol vessel in commission from 1917 to possibly 1918.

Hunch was built as a private motorboat of the same name in 1907 by the Charles L. Seabury Company and the Gas Engine and Power Company at Morris Heights in the Bronx, New York. In August 1917, the U.S. Navy acquired her from her owner, R. A. Alger of Detroit, Michigan, for use as a section patrol boat during World War I. Ensign P. L. Emerson, USNRF, was assigned as her first commanding officer.

Sources differ on Hunch's career. According to one source, she was returned to Alger in 1917 after little or no Navy service. According to others, she was assigned as USS Hunch (SP-1197) to patrol duties in the 9th, 10th, and 11th Naval Districts - at the time a single administrative entity formed by the amalgamation of the 9th Naval District, 10th Naval District, and 11th Naval District - and served as a patrol boat on the Detroit River until returned to Alger in 1918.
