= USS Grafton =

USS Grafton may refer to:

- USS Grafton (APA-109), formerly Sea Sparrow, was launched 10 August 1944 and decommissioned 16 May 1946. She was subsequently sold to American Mail Lines in 1947, where she served as Java Mail
- USS Grafton (PCS-1431), was laid down as PCS-1431 12 May 1943, named Grafton on 15 February 1956, and sold in April 1966
