= USS Gemini =

USS Gemini may refer to the following U.S. Navy ships:

- USS Gemini (AP-75), a troop transport vessel originally commissioned on 4 August 1942 as USS Matinicus (AK-52)
- USS Gemini (PHM-6), the final ship of her class of hydrofoils operated by the U.S. Navy
