= USS Hampton (ID-3049) =

Tugboat of the United States Navy

History

United States
- Name: USS Hampton
- Namesake: Previous name retained
- Builder: H. Turman, Turkey Point, Virginia
- Completed: 1905
- Acquired: 1918
- Commissioned: 21 April 1918
- Fate: Returned to owner 13 August 1919
- Notes: Operated as commercial tug Mary Lee and Hampton 1905-1917 and Hampton from 1919

General characteristics
- Type: Tug
- Tonnage: 48 gross register tons
- Length: 63 ft (19 m)
- Beam: 19 ft 4 in (5.89 m)
- Draft: 6 ft 3 in (1.91 m)
- Speed: 9 knots

The first USS Hampton (ID-3049), also listed as SP-3049, was a United States Navy tug in commission from 1918 to 1919.

Hampton was built as the commercial tug Mary Lee in 1905 by H. Turman at Turkey Point, Virginia. She later was renamed Hampton.

In 1918, the U.S. Navy chartered Hampton from her owner for use during World War I. She may initially have been assigned the section patrol number SP-3049, although she eventually was identified by the naval registry identification number ID-3049. She was commissioned as either USS Hampton (SP-3049) or USS Hampton (ID-3049) on 21 April 1918.

Assigned to the 5th Naval District at Norfolk, Virginia, Hampton served on general harbor duty in Hampton Roads for the rest of World War I and into 1919.

Hampton was returned to her owner on 13 August 1919.
