= USS Guide =

USS Guide is the name of the following ships of the U.S. Navy:

- USS Guide (AMc-83), was a coastal minesweeper launched 20 September 1941
- USS Guide (AM-447). was a minesweeper launched 17 April 1954
