= USS Glennon =

Two ships of the United States Navy have borne the name USS Glennon, in honor of Rear Admiral James H. Glennon.

- USS Glennon (DD-620), was a Gleaves-class destroyer, launched in 1942 and sunk by a mine in 1944
- USS Glennon (DD-840), was a Gearing-class destroyer launched in 1945 and struck in 1976
