= USS Harmon =

USS Harmon may refer to:

- USS Harmon (DE-72), was a planned Buckley-class destroyer escort transferred during construction to the Royal Navy in June 1943 and renamed HMS Aylmer
- USS Harmon (DE-678), a Buckley-class destroyer escort active during World War II
