= USS Hornet (1813) =

History

United States
- Name: USS Hornet
- Namesake: The hornet, a stinging insect
- Acquired: 1813
- Commissioned: 15 March 1814
- Fate: Sold 1820

General characteristics
- Type: Schooner
- Sail plan: schooner-rigged
- Complement: 57 officers and enlisted men
- Armament: 5 × 18-pounder guns

The fourth USS Hornet was a schooner that served in the U.S. Navy from 1814 to 1820.

Hornet was purchased at Georgetown, District of Columbia, in 1813, and commissioned 15 March 1814, Sailing Master Joseph Middleton in command.

Hornet served primarily as a dispatch ship along the eastern seaboard of the United States, assisting in some coast and harbor survey work before being sold at Norfolk, Virginia, in 1820.
