= USS Herman S. Caswell =

United States navy patrol vessel during World War I

History

United States
- Name: USS Herman S. Caswell
- Namesake: Previous name retained
- Completed: 1878
- Acquired: 8 October 1918
- In service: 8 October 1918
- Out of service: 7 March 1919
- Fate: Returned to owner 7 March 1919
- Notes: Operated as private yacht and ferry Herman S. Caswell 1878-1918 and from 1919

General characteristics
- Type: Patrol vessel
- Tonnage: 220 Gross register tons
- Displacement: 63 tons
- Length: 82 ft 9 in (25.22 m)
- Beam: 17 ft 7 in (5.36 m)
- Draft: 7 ft 6 in (2.29 m)
- Propulsion: One 198-indicated horsepower (148-kilowatt) steam engine, one shaft
- Speed: 10 knots
- Complement: 8 (civilian)
- Armament: None

USS Herman S. Caswell (SP-2311) was a United States Navy patrol vessel in service from 1918 to 1919.

Herman S. Caswell was built as a civilian passenger yacht or ferry of the same name in 1878 at Noank, Connecticut. On 8 October 1918, the U.S. Navy chartered her from her owner, New York Sightseeing Yachts, for use as a section patrol boat during World War I. She was placed in service as USS Herman S. Caswell (SP-2311).

Assigned to the 3rd Naval District, Herman S. Caswell served on patrol and harbor duties until returned to New York Sightseeing Yachts on 7 March 1919.
