= USS Humming Bird =

USS Humming Bird, sometimes known as USS Hummingbird, may refer to the following ships of the United States Navy:

- USS Humming Bird (AMc-26), was a coastal minesweeper placed in service 12 June 1941 and placed out of service 18 February 1945
- USS Hummingbird (AMS-192), was a minesweeper commissioned 9 February 1955 and sold for scrap in 1976
