= USS Grosbeak (AMc-19) =

Minesweeper of the United States Navy

History

United States
- Ordered: as Del Rio
- Laid down: 1935
- Launched: 1935
- Commissioned: 11 November 1940
- Decommissioned: 12 September 1944
- Stricken: 14 October 1944
- Fate: Returned to her former owner, 2 April 1945

General characteristics
- Displacement: 185 tons
- Length: 81 ft 2 in (24.74 m)
- Draft: 9 ft 8 in (2.95 m)
- Speed: 10 knots (19 km/h)
- Complement: 16

USS Grosbeak (AMc-19) was a Grosbeak-class coastal minesweeper acquired by the U.S. Navy for the dangerous task of removing mines from minefields laid in the water to prevent ships from passing.

Grosbeak, the former wooden purse seiner Del Rio was built by J. M. Martinac, Tacoma, Washington, in 1935; and commissioned 11 November 1940, Ens. T. F. Martin in command.

== World War II service ==
Following conversion to an auxiliary minesweeper at Alameda, California, Grosbeak joined Mine Division 1 at San Francisco Bay and nearby waters, but she was also used for training reserve and junior officers in small boat handling and minesweeping.

== Deactivation ==
Grosbeak decommissioned 12 September 1944. Her name was struck from the Navy List 14 October; and she was returned to her former owner at San Pedro, California, 2 April 1945.
