= USS Hydra =

USS Hydra may refer to the following ships of the United States Navy:

- USS Hydra (1869), was the light draft monitor Tunxis, renamed Hydra 15 June 1869, while laid up out of commission at League Island, Pennsylvania
- USS Hydra (AK-82), was a cargo ship launched in 1943 and decommissioned 19 November 1943 and transferred to the US Army.
