= USS Garland (1815) =

Ship of the Union Navy during the American Civil War

History

United States
- Name: Garland
- Launched: 1815
- Acquired: 28 October 1861
- In service: 1861
- Out of service: 1862
- Fate: transferred to the Union Army; 7 January 1862

General characteristics
- Tonnage: 243
- Length: 92 ft 5 in (28.17 m)
- Beam: 24 ft 4 in (7.42 m)
- Draft: 12 ft 2 in (3.71 m)
- Propulsion: sail

USS Garland was a bark acquired by the Union Navy during the American Civil War. The Navy planned on using her as part of the stone fleet; however, because of the Union Army's need for a supply ship, she was transferred to that service for the duration of the entire war.

== Service history ==
Garland was a bark built at Quincy, Massachusetts, in 1815 for service as a privateer. She was rebuilt at New Bedford, Massachusetts, in 1845 and purchased there by Morgan and Chappell for $3,150 for the Navy on 28 October 1861 for the "Stone Fleet." However, she was not used as an obstruction but transferred to the Army Quartermaster Department at Hilton Head, South Carolina, 7 January 1862 for service as a supply ship.
