= USS Hero (1861) =

Wooden schooner

USS Hero (1861), a wooden schooner, was purchased by the Union Navy during the American Civil War at Baltimore, Maryland, 13 August 1861 to obstruct inlets to Pamlico Sound, North Carolina, near Cape Hatteras.

She was apparently sunk in Ocracoke Inlet 14 November 1861 with two other schooners of the stone fleet.
