= USS Halcyon (SP-1658) =

History

United States
- Name: USS Halcyon
- Builder: Defoe Shipbuilding Company
- Launched: 1912
- Acquired: 16 June 1917
- Out of service: 5 November 1917
- Fate: Returned to owner

General characteristics
- Length: 40 ft (12 m)
- Beam: 9 ft 6 in (2.90 m)
- Draft: 2 ft 8 in (0.81 m)
- Speed: 10 kn (19 km/h)

The United States Navy patrol vessel USS Halcyon, was built by the Defoe Shipbuilding Company, in Bay City, Michigan, in 1912. She was taken over by the US Navy from her owner, G. G. Barnum, at Duluth, Minnesota, on 16 June 1917. After serving briefly on section patrol in the Great Lakes, 9th Naval District, Halcyon was returned to her owner on 5 November 1917.
