= USS Halcyon II =

Patrol vessel of the United States Navy

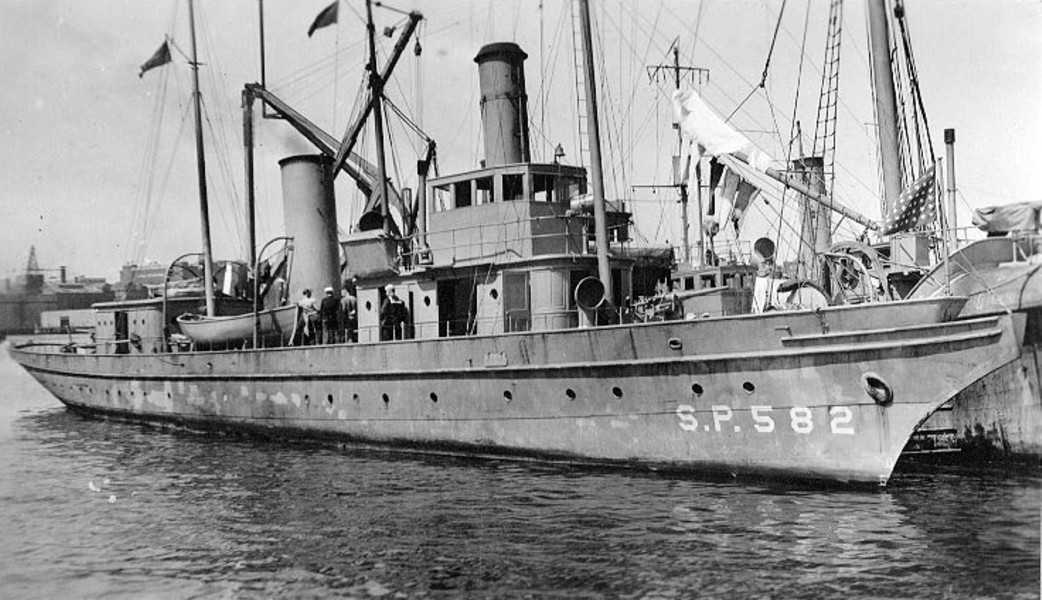
- USS SP-582 (1917-1919, ex-Halcyon II) photographed circa 1918-19 at Wakefield, Massachusetts.

History

United States
- Name: USS Halcyon II
- Namesake: A former name retained
- Builder: Charles Seabury Gas Engine and Power Co., Morris Heights, Bronx, New York
- Laid down: date unknown
- Launched: date unknown
- Christened: as the yacht Halcyon II
- Completed: 1907
- Acquired: August 1917
- Commissioned: 15 December 1917 as USS Halcyon II (SP 582) at the Boston Navy Yard
- Out of service: 4 June 1919 after collision
- Renamed: USS SP-582 in 1918
- Stricken: 31 July 1919
- Home port: Boston, Massachusetts
- Fate: Sold 4 December 1919 to her former owner.

General characteristics
- Type: Yacht
- Tonnage: 161 tons
- Length: 140 ft (43 m)
- Beam: 18 ft 3 in (5.56 m)
- Draft: 5 ft (1.5 m)
- Propulsion: Steam engine
- Speed: 15 knots
- Complement: not known
- Armament: two 3-pounder guns

USS Halcyon II (SP-582) was a yacht acquired by the U.S. Navy during World War I. She was outfitted as an armed patrol craft and stationed in Boston harbor in Massachusetts. She spent much of the war patrolling the Massachusetts waterways for German submarines and, in 1919, was decommissioned after being damaged in a collision.

== Commissioned at Boston ==
Halcyon II, a 161-ton steam yacht, was built by Charles Seabury Gas Engine & Power Co. of Morris Heights, Bronx, New York in 1907, and was purchased by the Navy in August 1917 from her owner, D. W. Flint of Providence, Rhode Island. She commissioned 15 December 1917 at Boston Navy Yard.

== World War I service ==
After fitting out, Halcyon II was employed as a section and harbor patrol boat in Boston Harbor through the rest of World War I and into the first year of peace. She performed this service until 4 June 1919 when she was rammed and seriously damaged by the steamer Bayou Teohe.

== Decommissioning and disposal ==
Determined by the Navy to be unserviceable, she was struck from the Navy List 31 July 1919 and sold her back to her former owner on 4 December 1919.
