= USS Helenita (YP-2230) =

History

United States
- Namesake: USS Helenita
- Owner: Marine Aviation Corps
- Laid down: date unknown
- Acquired: by the Navy in 1919
- In service: February 1919
- Out of service: August 1919
- Stricken: not known
- Home port: Norfolk, Virginia
- Fate: Loaned to the City of Norfolk, Virginia, Department of Public Safety; later sold on 22 June 1923

General characteristics
- Type: Motorboat
- Displacement: not known
- Length: 45 ft (14 m)
- Beam: 11 ft 8 in (3.56 m)
- Draft: not known
- Propulsion: not known
- Speed: not known
- Complement: not known
- Armament: not known

USS Helenita (YP-2230) was a motorboat acquired by the U.S. Navy during World War I. She was configured as a district patrol craft, and was used to patrol the Norfolk, Virginia, waterways. She was then loaned to the city of Norfolk before eventually being sold as excess to needs.

== Built as a motorboat ==
The second military vessel to be so named by the U.S. Navy, Helenita was a small wooden motor boat acquired by the Navy in 1919, probably from the Marine Aviation Corps.

== World War I service ==
She was used as a district patrol craft in the 5th Naval District, Norfolk, Virginia, from February to August 1919.

== On loan to Norfolk, Virginia ==
In August 1919 she was transferred to the City of Norfolk, Virginia, Department of Public Safety. Transferred 30 August, Helenita served the city until 1 December 1922, when she was returned to the Navy at Norfolk.

== Final disposition ==
She was finally sold to H. W. Bleckley, Milwaukee, Wisconsin, 22 June 1923.
