= USS Hazel (SP-1207) =

Patrol vessel of the United States Navy

History

United States
- Name: USS Hazel
- Namesake: former name retained
- Owner: J. W. Mathews, Chincoteague, Virginia
- Laid down: date unknown
- Commissioned: 1 June 1917
- Decommissioned: 1919 (est.)
- Home port: Chincoteague, Virginia; Hampton Roads, Virginia
- Fate: Returned to her owner 16 January 1919

General characteristics
- Type: motorboat
- Displacement: 10 tons
- Length: 44 ft (13 m)
- Beam: 9 ft 6 in (2.90 m)
- Draft: 3 ft 3 in (0.99 m)
- Propulsion: internal combustion engine
- Speed: 8 knots
- Armament: one 1-pounder gun

The first USS Hazel (SP-1207) was a 44-foot-long 10-ton motor launch borrowed by the U.S. Navy during World War I. Hazel was armed as a patrol craft and was assigned to patrol the Virginia coast and the Chesapeake Bay. She was returned to her owner at war's end.

== Acquired in Virginia ==
Hazel (SP-1207), a small motor boat, was acquired from her owner, J. W. Mathews, Chincoteague, Virginia, and commissioned 1 June 1917, Chief Boatswain's Mate D. J. Jester commanding.

== World War I service ==
Assigned to the 5th Naval District – headquartered at Norfolk, Virginia -- Hazel operated as a patrol craft and performed general, harbor duties around Chincoteague Island and in Hampton Roads, Virginia. She occasionally made cruises up Chesapeake Bay as far as Annapolis, Maryland.

== Post-war disposition ==
Hazel was returned to her owner 16 January 1919.
