= USS Hurst (SP-3196) =

Patrol vessel of the United States Navy

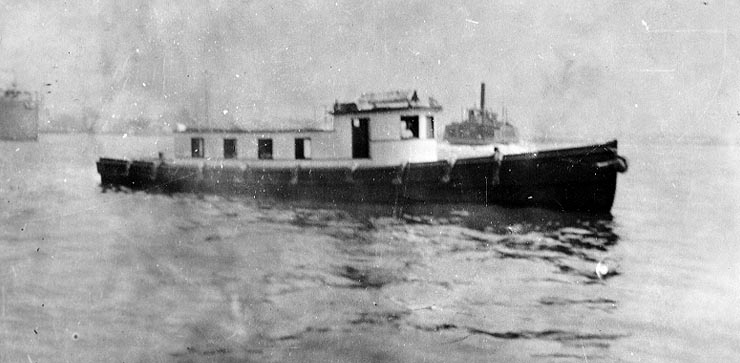
- Hurst as a civilian motorboat in 1918.

History

United States
- Name: USS Hurst
- Namesake: Previous name retained
- Builder: W. F. Dunn, Norfolk, Virginia
- Completed: 1918
- Acquired: 22 or 23 August 1918
- Commissioned: 22 August 1918
- Fate: Transferred to U.S. Public Health Service 15 November 1919

General characteristics
- Type: Patrol vessel
- Tonnage: 17 GRT or 35 GRT
- Length: 62 ft 7 in (19.08 m) or 69 ft 7 in (21.21 m)
- Beam: 12 ft 8 in (3.86 m) or 13 ft 2 in (4.01 m)
- Draft: 4 ft (1.2 m) or 5 ft (1.5 m)
- Speed: 11 or 15 knots
- Armament: 1 × 3-pounder gun

The first USS Hurst (SP-3196) was a United States Navy patrol vessel in commission from 1918 to 1919.

Hurst was built in 1918 as a private motorboat by W. F. Dunn at Norfolk, Virginia. On 22 or 23 August 1918, the U.S. Navy acquired her from her owner, T. C. Hurst of Norfolk, for use as a section patrol boat during World War I. She was commissioned the same day as USS Hurst (SP-3196).

Assigned to the 5th Naval District, Hurst served as a transportation and dispatch boat in the Hampton Roads, Virginia, area for the District Supervisor, Naval Overseas Transportation Service, until she was transferred to the United States Public Health Service on 15 November 1919.
