= Naval Base San Pedro =

World War II Naval Base in Los Angeles

- Location within the Los Angeles metropolitan area
- 33°43′15″N 118°16′20″W
- Location: San Pedro, California

History
- Built: Founded 1941

Site notes
- Architect: US Navy

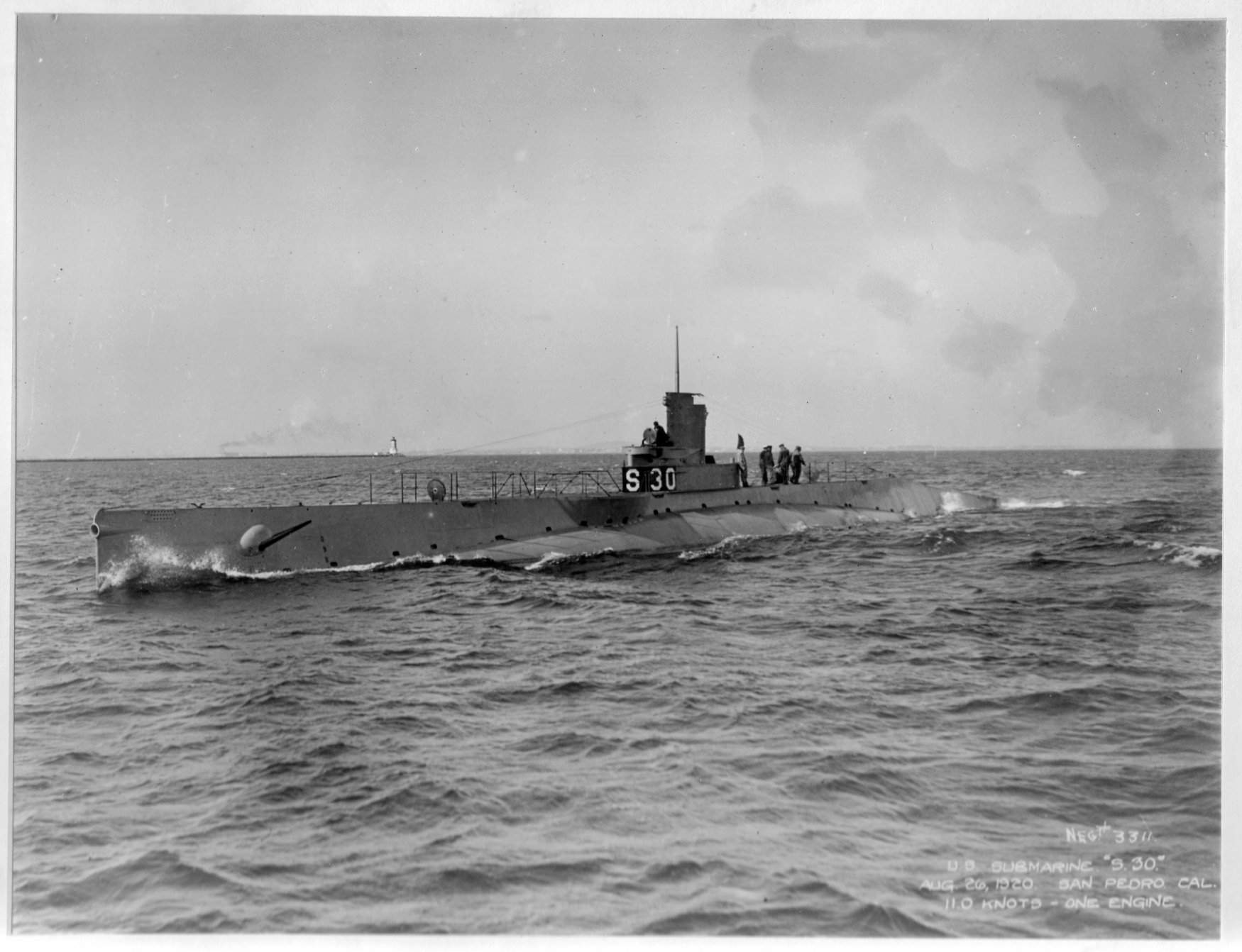
USS S-30 during sea trials a San Pedro Submarine Base, Los Angeles lighthouse in background

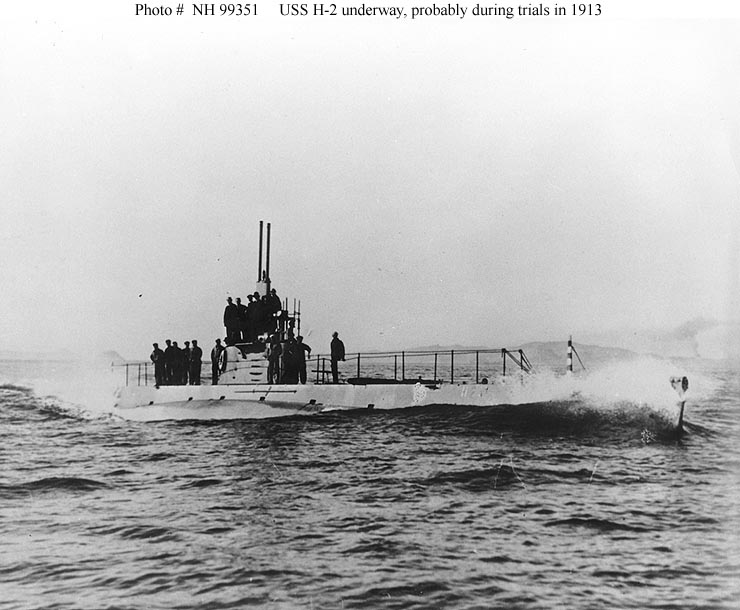
USS H-2 during sea trials at San Pedro Submarine Base in 1913

Naval Base San Pedro and San Pedro Submarine Base were United States Navy bases at the Port of San Pedro, California officially founded in 1919. While commissioned in 1919, the Navy started operating out of the port in 1910, by renting dock space at the City of San Pedro's Dock No. 1 in 1914. The Navy had vessels stationed at the port starting in 1913. The San Pedro Submarine Base closed in 1923, with the end of World War I. Naval Base San Pedro became part of Naval Operating Base Terminal Island on 25 September 1941, which closed in 1947.

== San Pedro Submarine Base ==
San Pedro Submarine Base was officially established on June 10, 1917 in response to the outbreak of World War I. San Pedro Submarine Base operated as a Naval coastal defense unit. The USS Pike and the USS Grampus completed in 1902 were built in San Francisco, California. The Holland Torpedo Boat Company of New York City contracted Union Iron Works to build the two Plunger-class submarines. For three and half years the two submarines operated out of Mare Island Naval Shipyard in San Francisco Bay for training and testing. In July 1910 the Pike and Grampus relocated to San Pedro Submarine Base. In 1913 the F-class submarines were stationed at the port of San Pedro. The submarines of the 1st Submarine Group, Pacific Torpedo Flotilla arrive in 1913. To support the submarines the submarine tender, USS Cheyenne and USS Alert were stationed at San Pedro Submarine Base. The submarine tenders had housing and a mess hall for the crew. To resupply the tenders, they would dock at the rented San Pedro Dock No. 1. On June 10, 1917, work on land facilities started to offer quarters, mess hall, freshwater supply, ship fuel, and storage. The 2nd Torpedo Flotilla, Pacific Fleet with Holland 602 type submarine began operating out of San Pedro Submarine Base. USS Cheyenne and USS Alert sometimes depart the port for short-needed support missions up and down the California and Pacific Coast.

San Pedro Submarine Base became a submarine School for enlisted sailors in October 1917. The base had 525 Navy personnel stationed at the San Pedro Submarine Base. In 1917 the Navy also founded the Naval Reserve Training Station with the F-class submarines: F-1, F-2, and F-3. The base closed in 1923 and the submarines moved to Naval Base San Diego.

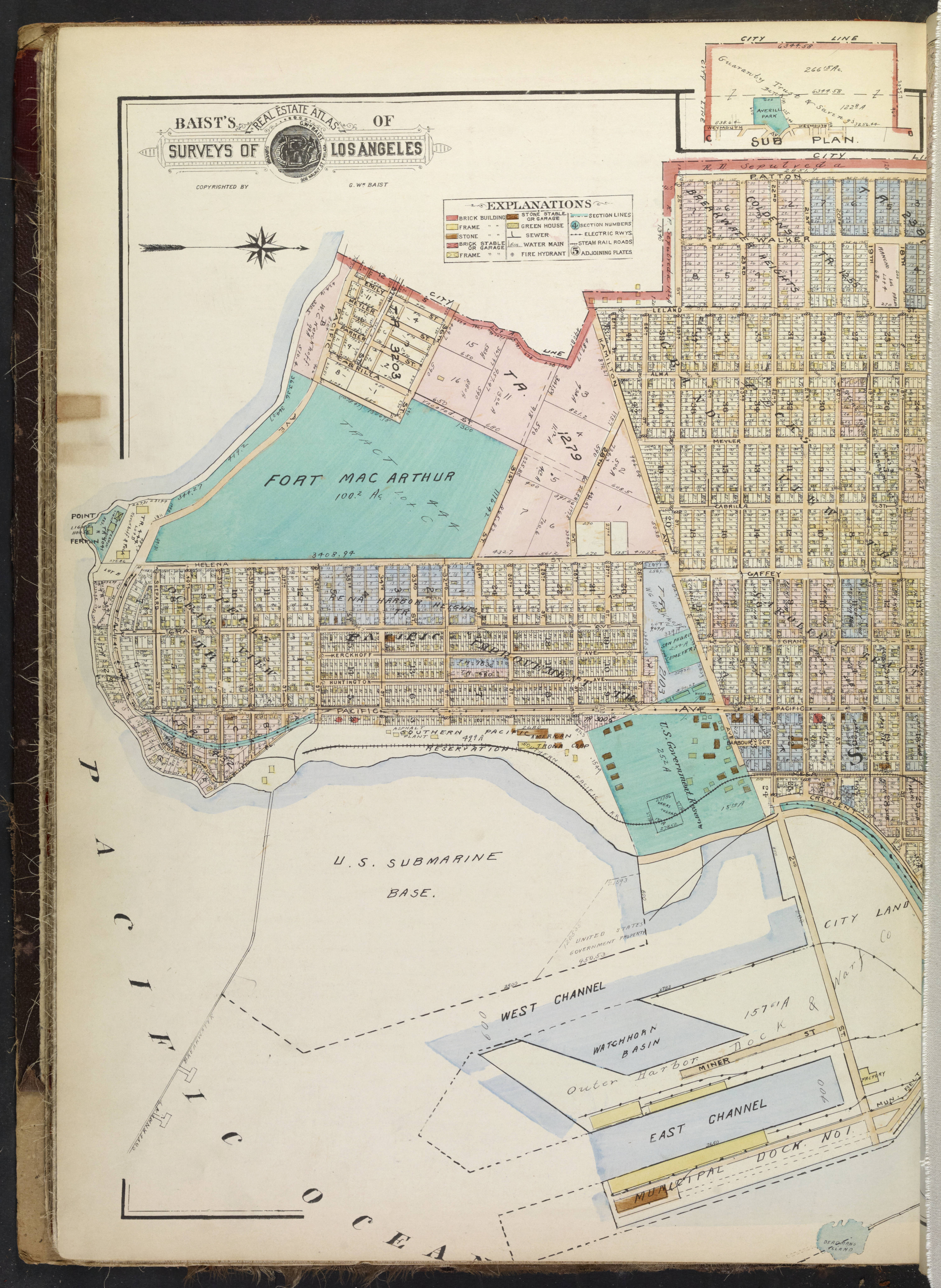
Real-estate map showing locations of Submarine Base, Point Fermin Light, and Fort MacArthur in 1921

=== Pacific Torpedo Flotilla ===
In 1913 the Pacific Torpedo Flotilla of the United States Pacific Fleet began operating out of Naval Base San Pedro. San Pedro Submarine Base Submarine:

  - First Submarine Group founded:
- USS Pike
- USS Grampus
- USS F-1
- USS F-2
- USS F-3
- USS F-4
  - Second-Line boats 6th Division San Pedro:
- USS F-1
- USS F-3
- USS H-2
- USS H-3
- USS H-4
- USS H-5
- USS H-6
- USS H-7
- USS H-8
- USS H-9
- USS L-5
- USS L-6
- USS L-7
- USS L-8
- Tenders of San Pedro Submarine Base:
- USS Cheyenne
- USS Alert
- USS Beaver (AS-5)
- USS Camden (AS-6)
- USS Rainbow (AS-7)
- USS Canopus (AS-9)

=== Submarine sea trials ===
San Pedro Submarine Base was also used for testing and sea trials of new submarines. From August to November 1918 some new R-class submarines arrived after construction at Union Iron Works in San Francisco. Tested were R-15 (SS-91), R-16 (SS-92), R-17 (SS-93), R-18 (SS-94), R-19 (SS-95), R-20 (SS-96) and O-2 (SS-63).

== Naval Base San Pedro ==
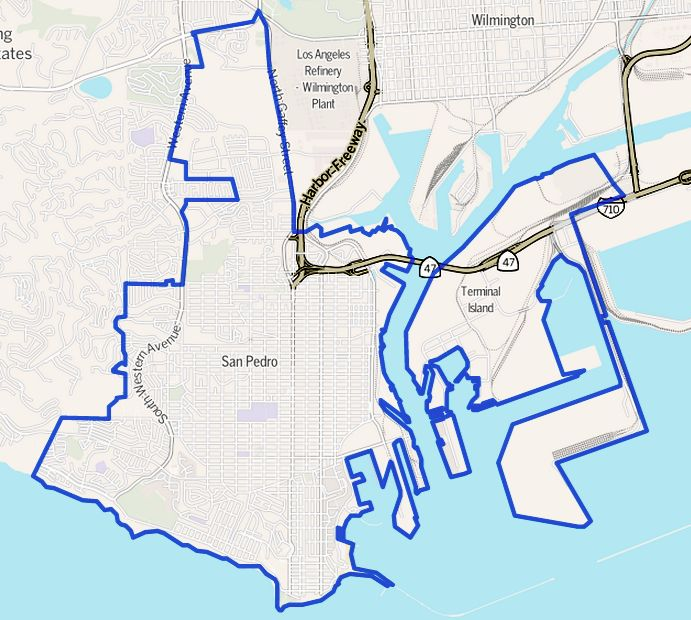
Map of the city of San Pedro, part on the southern part of Palos Verdes Peninsula and part on Terminal Island

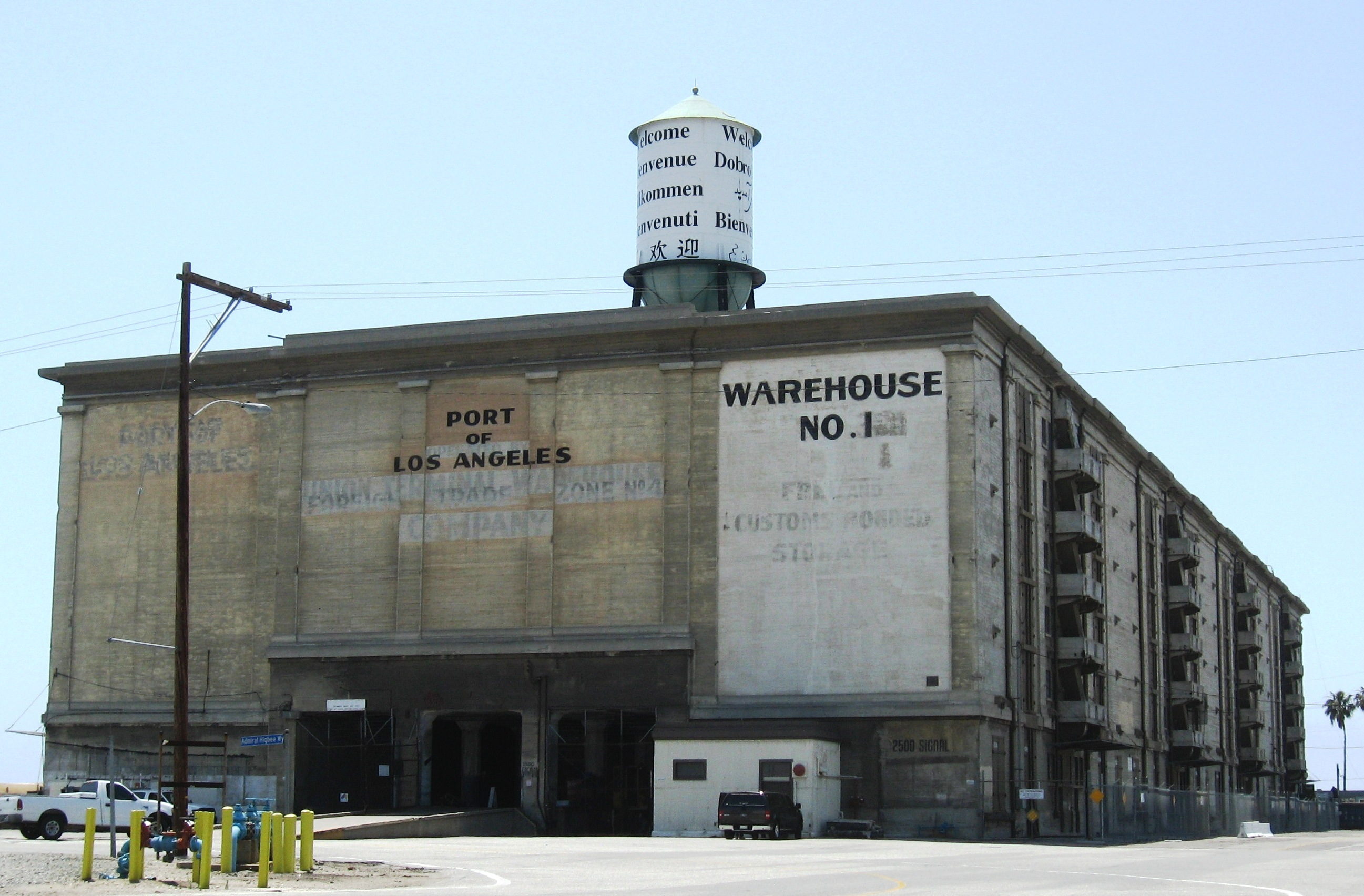
Municipal Warehouse No. 1 on pier No. 1 at San Pedro, part of the Warehouse was used by the US Navy for Pedro Submarine Base and Naval Base San Pedro

After World War I which Japan fought on the Allied side, Japan took control of German bases in China and the Pacific. In 1919, the League of Nations approved Japan's mandate over the German islands north of the equator. The U.S. did not want any mandates and was concerned with aggressiveness. As such Wilson Administration transferred 200 Atlantic warships to the Pacific Fleet in 1919. The Port of San Diego, not yet developed, was too shallow to handle the battleships, so San Pedro Submarine Base became a Naval Base on August 9, 1919. San Pedro Submarine Base and Long Beach became fleet anchorage for the 200 ships. In 1940 President Roosevelt authorized the fleet at San Pedro to be stationed at Honolulu's Naval Base Pearl Harbor due to Japanese war actions. The USS Farragut (TB-11) a training ship was based at San Pedro from 12 January 1915 to 14 April 1917.

- Fleet support:

San Pedro from 1919 to 1940 became the home port for some Navy ships of the Pacific Battle Fleet. Some ships base at San Pedro: USS Wyoming (BB-32) USS Arkansas (BB-33) USS New York (BB-34) USS Texas (BB-35) USS Nevada (BB-36) USS Oklahoma (BB-37) USS Pennsylvania (BB-38) USS Arizona (BB-39) USS New Mexico (BB-40) USS Mississippi (BB-41) USS Idaho (BB-42) USS Tennessee (BB-43) USS California (BB-44) USS Colorado (BB-45) USS Maryland (BB-46) and USS West Virginia (BB-48); Aircraft Carriers USS Saratoga (CV-3) and USS Lexington (CV-2); Repair Ships USS Argonne (AS-10), USS Medusa (AR-1) and USS Vestal; and Hospital Ships USS Mercy (AH-4) and USS Relief (AH-1).

A number of US Navy destroyers built in California used the base for supplies and sea trials. US destroyers at the base included: USS Ward, USS Caldwell (DD-69) USS Robinson (DD-88), USS Schley (DD-103), USS Mugford (DD-105), USS Boggs (DD-136), USS Ludlow (DD-112), and USS Kilty (DD-137). Other US Navy ships also used the base for resupply and a repair facility.

== Early port history ==
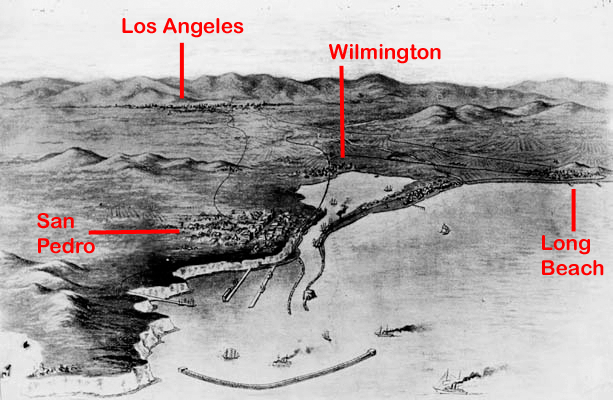
San Pedro Bay in a 1900 plan for the Los Angeles Harbor, present cities and districts are named

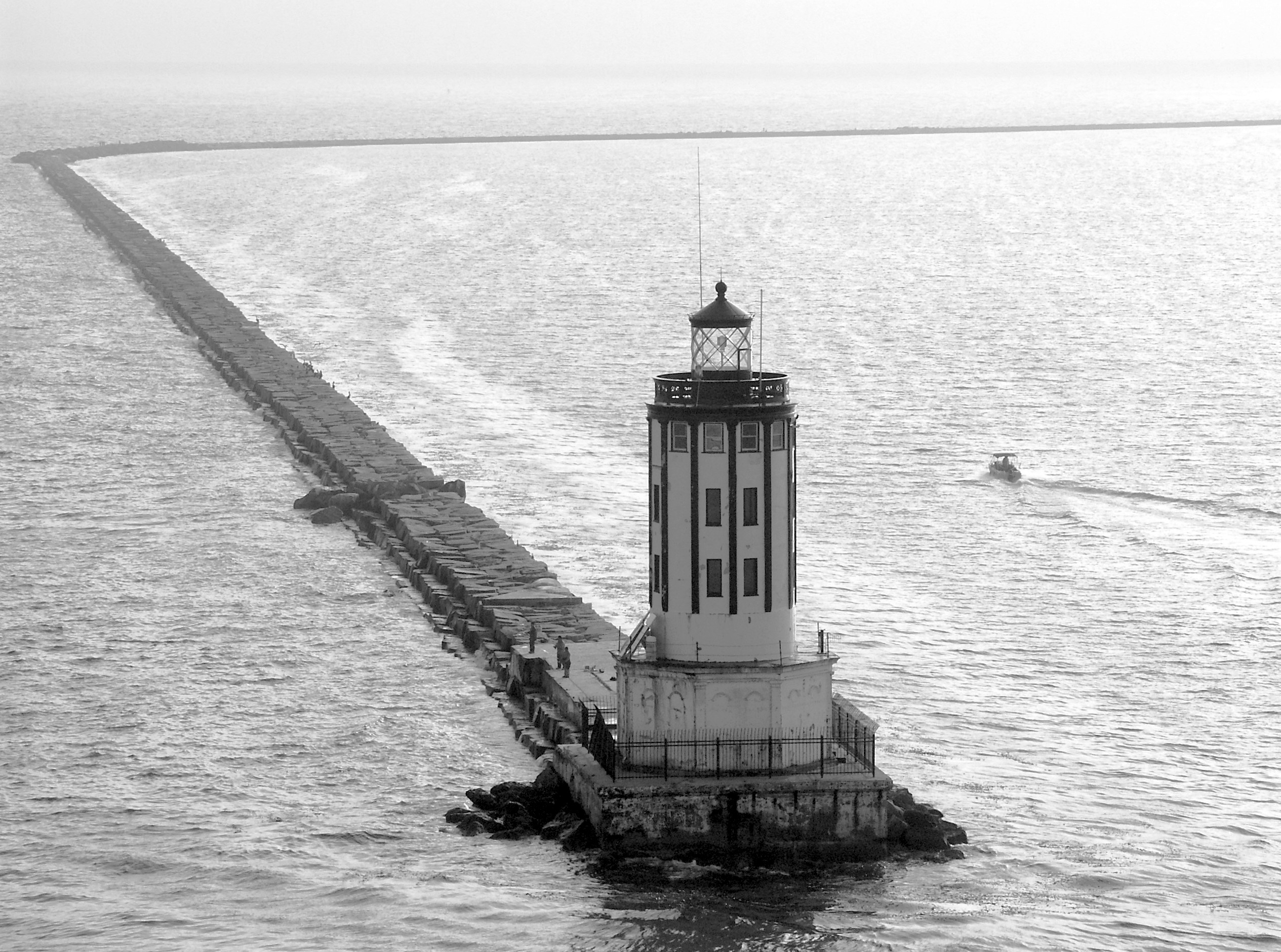
Los Angeles Harbor Light built in 1913, on the 2.11-mile San Pedro breakwater was completed in 1911

The first time the US Navy operated out of the Port of San Pedro was during the Mexican–American War, on 6 August 1846 when Commodore Robert F. Stockton sailed into the port with the USS Congress and took over the port. On August 11 First Lieutenant Jacob Zeilin leading US Marines and some US Navy sailors marched to the City of Los Angeles and captured it. The port remained a small unit till 1851 when Phineas Banning built a new wharf and warehouse in San Pedro, but a storm in 1858 destroyed the wharf. The US moved its operation to the new town of New San Pedro, now called Wilmington. During the American Civil War troops were stationed at New San Pedro. In 1869 the Southern Pacific Railroad operated a rail line to the Port of San Pedro and the port grew. The US founded a military reservation in 1888 in an area surrounding San Pedro Bay as part of a harbor defense system. Port growth stopped when politics changed and Los Angeles picked Santa Monica as the site for a new large port. The Port Los Angeles's long Wharf in Santa Monica was completed in 1894. The 4,700 feet Wharf had a Southern Pacific Railroad line that run out on the Wharf to the dock. San Pedro Bay port area was annexed to Los Angeles in 1909 and in 1913 a storm ended the Santa Monica operation. Thus Port of San Pedro grew to be a major port. To protect San Pedro Bay construction of a breakwater started on April 26, 1899, when the first barge with rocks quarried from nearby Catalina Island were dumped in the bay. The 2.11-mile San Pedro breakwater was completed in 1911. In 1913 the Los Angeles lighthouse (Angel's Gate Light) was built at the end of the San Pedro breakwater, now a U.S. National Register of Historic Places. It was 35 years before all of the Los Angeles Harbor breakwater was completed. With the protection of the breakwater and loss of the Santa Monica Wharf the Port of San Pedro grew into a major port.

== See also ==
- United States Navy submarine bases
- US Naval Advance Bases
- Long Beach Naval Shipyard
- Naval Air Base San Pedro
- Camp Ross San Pedro
