= USS H-1 =

H-class submarine of the United States

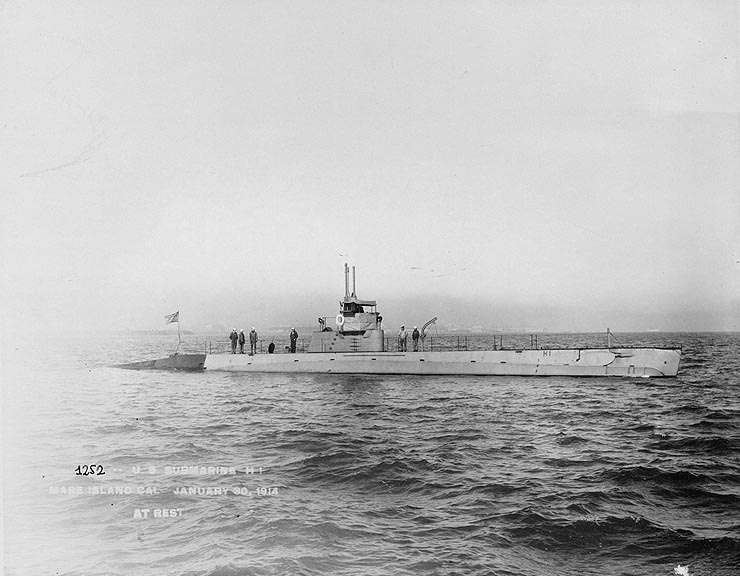
- USS H-1, ex-Seawolf, off the Mare Island Navy Yard, California, 30 January 1914

History

United States
- Name: Seawolf
- Namesake: The seawolf
- Builder: Union Iron Works, San Francisco, California
- Cost: $510,428.77 (hull and machinery)
- Laid down: 22 March 1911
- Launched: 6 May 1913
- Sponsored by: Miss Leslie Makins
- Commissioned: 1 December 1913
- Renamed: H-1 (Submarine No.28), 17 November 1911
- Stricken: 12 April 1920
- Identification: Hull symbol: SS-28 (17 July 1920); Call sign: NYC
- Fate: Grounded on a shoal, 12 March 1920

General characteristics
- Type: H-class submarine
- Displacement: 358 long tons (364 t) surfaced; 467 long tons (474 t) submerged
- Length: 150 ft 4 in (45.82 m)
- Beam: 15 ft 10 in (4.83 m)
- Draft: 12 ft 5 in (3.78 m)
- Installed power: 950 hp (710 kW) (diesel engines); 600 hp (450 kW) (electric motors)
- Propulsion: 2 × NELSECO diesel engines; 2 × Electro Dynamic electric motors; 2 × 60-cell batteries; 2 × Propellers
- Speed: 14 kn (26 km/h; 16 mph) surfaced; 10.5 kn (19.4 km/h; 12.1 mph) submerged
- Range: 2,300 nmi (4,300 km; 2,600 mi) at 11 kn (20 km/h; 13 mph) surfaced; 100 nmi (190 km; 120 mi) at 5 kn (9.3 km/h; 5.8 mph) submerged
- Test depth: 200 ft (61 m)
- Capacity: 11,800 US gal (45,000 L; 9,800 imp gal) fuel
- Complement: 2 officers; 23 enlisted
- Armament: 4 × 18 inch (450 mm) bow torpedo tubes (8 torpedoes)

USS Seawolf/H-1 (SS-28), also known as "Submarine No. 28", was the lead ship of her class of submarine of the United States Navy (USN). She was the first ship of the USN to be named for the seawolf, though she was renamed H-1 prior to launching.

== Design ==
The H-class submarines had an overall length of 150 ft 4 in (45.8 m), a beam of 15 ft 10 in (4.8 m), and a mean draft of 12 ft 5 in (3.8 m). They displaced 358 long tons (364 t) on the surface and 467 long tons (474 t) submerged. They had a diving depth of 200 ft (61.0 m). The boats had a crew of 2 officers and 23 enlisted men.

For surface running, they were powered by two New London Ship & Engine Company 475-brake-horsepower (354 kW) diesel engines, each driving one propeller shaft. When submerged each propeller was driven by two 170-horsepower (127 kW) Electro-Dynamic Company electric motors. They could reach 14 kn (26 km/h; 16 mph) on the surface and 10.5 kn (19.4 km/h; 12.1 mph) underwater. On the surface, the boats had a range of 2,300 nmi (4,300 km; 2,600 mi) at 11 kn (20 km/h; 13 mph) and 100 nmi (190 km; 120 mi) at 5 kn (9.3 km/h; 5.8 mph) submerged.

The boats were armed with four 18-inch (450 mm) torpedo tubes in the bow. They carried four reloads, for a total of eight torpedoes.

== Construction ==
Seawolf's keel was laid down, on 22 March 1911, by the Union Iron Works, of San Francisco, California. She was renamed, H-1, on 17 November 1911, and launched on 6 May 1913, sponsored by Miss Lesley Jean Makins. H-1 was commissioned at Mare Island Navy Yard, on 1 December 1913.

== Service history ==
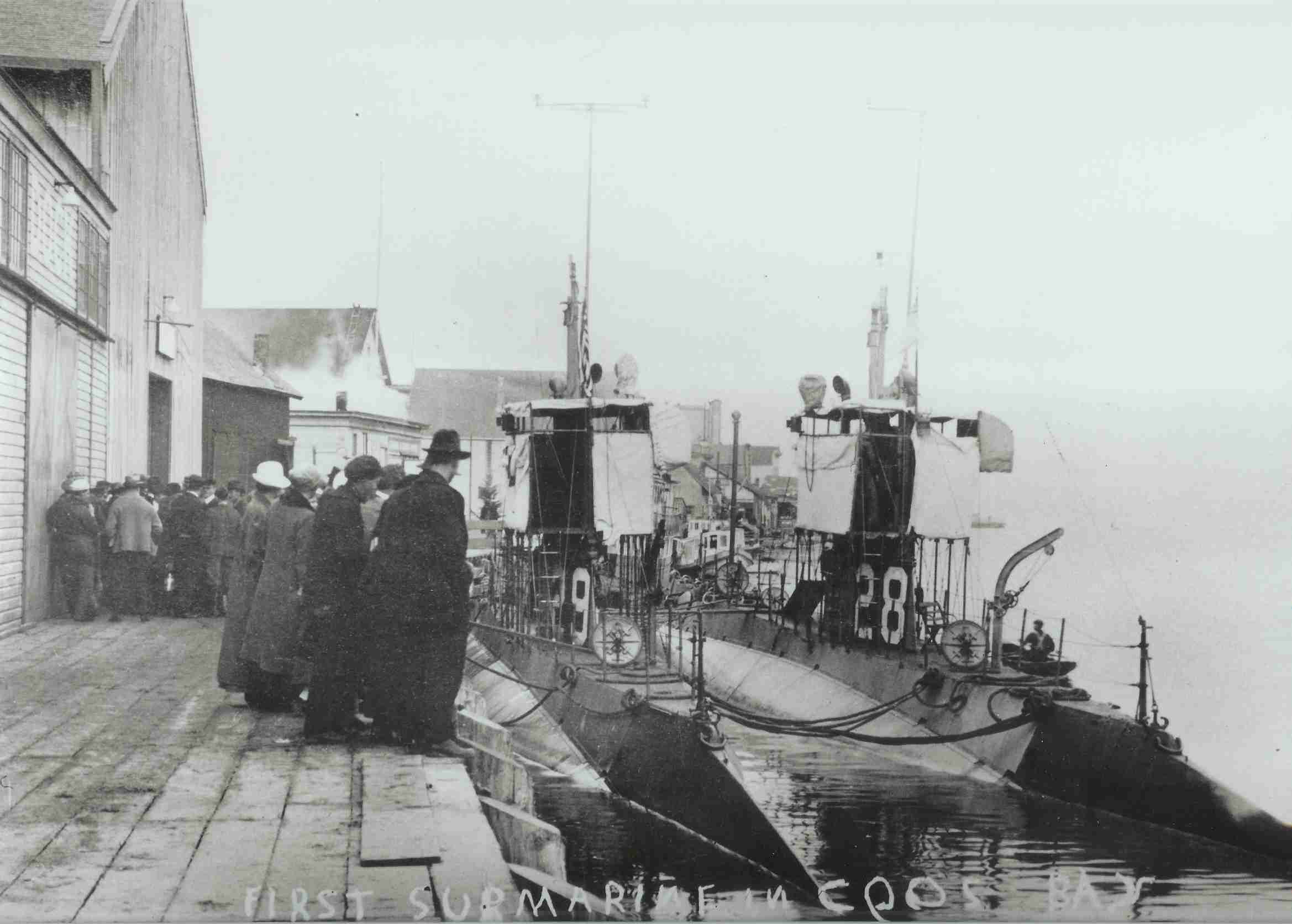
H-1 and H-2, in Coos Bay, Oregon

The new submarine was attached to the 2nd Torpedo Flotilla, Pacific Fleet, and operated along the West Coast, out of San Pedro, California. During various exercises and patrols, she traveled the coast from Los Angeles to lower British Columbia, often in company with her sister ships H-2 and sometimes H-3.

Sailing from San Pedro, on 17 October 1917, she reached New London, Connecticut, on 8 November. For the remainder of World War I, she was based there and patrolled Long Island Sound, frequently with officer students from the submarine school on board.

H-1 and H-2 sailed for San Pedro, on 6 January 1920, transiting the Panama Canal on 20 February. On 12 March, as H-1 made her way up the coast of Mexico's Baja California Peninsula, she ran aground on a shoal off Magdalena Bay. Four men, including the commanding officer, died trying to reach shore.

The diesel freighter Mazatlan, on her maiden voyage for the California & Mexico Steamship Company, also this line's inaugural voyage, tried to pull the submarine into deep water, and then carried 22 survivors to San Pedro, where they arrived on March 18.

The repair ship Vestal pulled H-1 off the rocks in the morning of 24 March, but in only 45 minutes, the submarine sank in some 50 ft (15 m) of water. Further salvage effort was abandoned. Her name was stricken from the Naval Vessel Register on 12 April 1920, and she was sold for scrap in June 1920, but never recovered.

In 2019, her wreck was identified south of Baja California.

== Bibliography ==
- "Table 21 - Ships on Navy List June 30, 1919". Congressional Serial Set. U.S. Government Printing Office: 766. 1921.
- Priolo, Gary. "Seawolf / H-1 (SS-28)". Navsource.net.
- Friedman, Norman (1995). U.S. Submarines Through 1945: An Illustrated Design History. Annapolis, Maryland: Naval Institute Press. ISBN 1-55750-263-3.
- Gardiner, Robert & Gray, Randal (1985). Conway's All the World's Fighting Ships 1906–1921. Annapolis, Maryland: Naval Institute Press. ISBN 0-85177-245-5.
- Evans, Mark L. (6 September 2018). "H-1 (Submarine No. 28)". Dictionary of American Naval Fighting Ships. Navy Department, Naval History and Heritage Command. This article incorporates text from this source, which is in the public domain.
- "Steamer Mazatlan Arrives in Port". Riverside Daily Press. 18 March 1920. p. 4.
- "Hallan submarino de la Primera Guerra Mundial en las costas de México" [First World War submarine found off the coast of Mexico]. CNN en Espanol (in Spanish). 5 September 2019.
- Hendren, Richard H. (December 2021). "The History of the H-class Submarines and Archeology of the Submarine H-1 (Ex Seawolf) (1913-1920)" (PDF).
