= USS H-5 =

H-class submarine of the United States

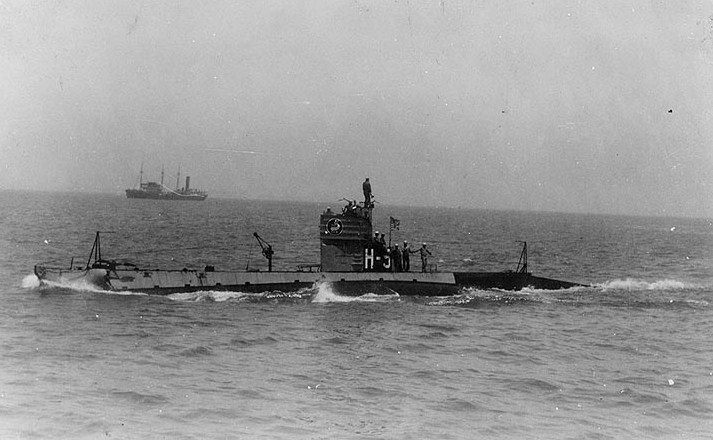
- H-5 underway, c. 1922

History

United States
- Name: H-5
- Ordered: by the Imperial Russian Navy, 1915
- Builder: British Pacific Construction and Engineering Company, Vancouver, Canada; Puget Sound Navy Yard, Bremerton, Washington
- Cost: $564,423.08 (hull and machinery)
- Laid down: 12 May 1918
- Launched: 24 September 1918
- Sponsored by: Miss Mary Ingram Hoopes
- Commissioned: 30 September 1918
- Decommissioned: 20 October 1922
- Stricken: 26 February 1931
- Identification: Hull symbol: SS-148 (17 July 1920); Call sign: NETG
- Fate: Sold for scrapping, 28 September 1931

General characteristics
- Type: H-class submarine
- Displacement: 358 long tons (364 t) surfaced; 467 long tons (474 t) submerged
- Length: 150 ft 4 in (45.82 m)
- Beam: 15 ft 10 in (4.83 m)
- Draft: 12 ft 5 in (3.78 m)
- Installed power: 950 hp (710 kW) (diesel engines); 600 hp (450 kW) (electric motors)
- Propulsion: 2 × NELSECO diesel engines; 2 × Electro Dynamic electric motors; 2 × 60-cell batteries; 2 × Propellers
- Speed: 14 kn (26 km/h; 16 mph) surfaced; 10.5 kn (19.4 km/h; 12.1 mph) submerged
- Range: 2,300 nmi (4,300 km; 2,600 mi) at 11 kn (20 km/h; 13 mph) surfaced; 100 nmi (190 km; 120 mi) at 5 kn (9.3 km/h; 5.8 mph) submerged
- Test depth: 200 ft (61 m)
- Capacity: 11,800 US gal (45,000 L; 9,800 imp gal) fuel
- Complement: 2 officers; 23 enlisted
- Armament: 4 × 18 inch (450 mm) bow torpedo tubes (8 torpedoes)

USS H-5 (SS-148) was an H-class submarine of the United States Navy (USN) originally built for the Imperial Russian Navy. Six of these were not delivered, pending the outcome of the Russian Revolution of 1917, before being purchased by the USN, on 20 May 1918.

== Design ==
The H-class submarines had an overall length of 150 ft 4 in (45.8 m), a beam of 15 ft 10 in (4.8 m), and a mean draft of 12 ft 5 in (3.8 m). They displaced 358 long tons (364 t) on the surface and 467 long tons (474 t) submerged. They had a diving depth of 200 ft (61.0 m). The boats had a crew of 2 officers and 23 enlisted men.

USS H-4 - General Arrangement - NARA - 75841758

For surface running, they were powered by two New London Ship & Engine Company 475-brake-horsepower (354 kW) diesel engines, each driving one propeller shaft. When submerged each propeller was driven by two 170-horsepower (127 kW) Electro-Dynamic Company electric motors. They could reach 14 kn (26 km/h; 16 mph) on the surface and 10.5 kn (19.4 km/h; 12.1 mph) underwater. On the surface, the boats had a range of 2,300 nmi (4,300 km; 2,600 mi) at 11 kn (20 km/h; 13 mph) and 100 nmi (190 km; 120 mi) at 5 kn (9.3 km/h; 5.8 mph) submerged.

The boats were armed with four 18-inch (450 mm) torpedo tubes in the bow. They carried four reloads, for a total of eight torpedoes.

== Construction ==
H-5 was laid down on 12 May 1918, at the Puget Sound Navy Yard, she had already been preassembled by the British Pacific Construction and Engineering Company, in Vancouver, Canada, for Imperial Russian Government, which had failed to exist in September 1917. She was launched on 24 September 1918, sponsored by Miss Mary Ingram Hoopes, and commissioned on 30 September 1918.

== Service history ==
Operating out of San Pedro Submarine Base, San Pedro, California, with Submarine Divisions 6 and 7 (SubDivs 6 and SubDiv 7), H-5 participated in various training and battle exercises, with periodic overhauls at the Mare Island Navy Yard.

== Fate ==
She departed San Francisco, California, on 25 July 1922, in company with both divisions and arrived at Norfolk, Virginia, on 14 September. H-5 decommissioned at Norfolk, on 20 October 1922. Her name was struck from the Naval Vessel Register on 26 February 1931. She was sold for scrapping on 28 November 1933.

== Bibliography ==
- "Table 21 - Ships on Navy List June 30, 1919". Congressional Serial Set. U.S. Government Printing Office: 766. 1921.
- Priolo, Gary. "H-5 (SS-148)". Navsource.net.
- Friedman, Norman (1995). U.S. Submarines Through 1945: An Illustrated Design History. Annapolis, Maryland: Naval Institute Press. ISBN 1-55750-263-3.
- Gardiner, Robert & Gray, Randal, eds. (1985). Conway's All the World's Fighting Ships 1906–1921. Annapolis, Maryland: Naval Institute Press. ISBN 0-85177-245-5.
- "H-5". Dictionary of American Naval Fighting Ships. Navy Department, Naval History and Heritage Command. 24 December 2014. This article incorporates text from this source, which is in the public domain.
