= USS Beaver =

Tender of the United States Navy

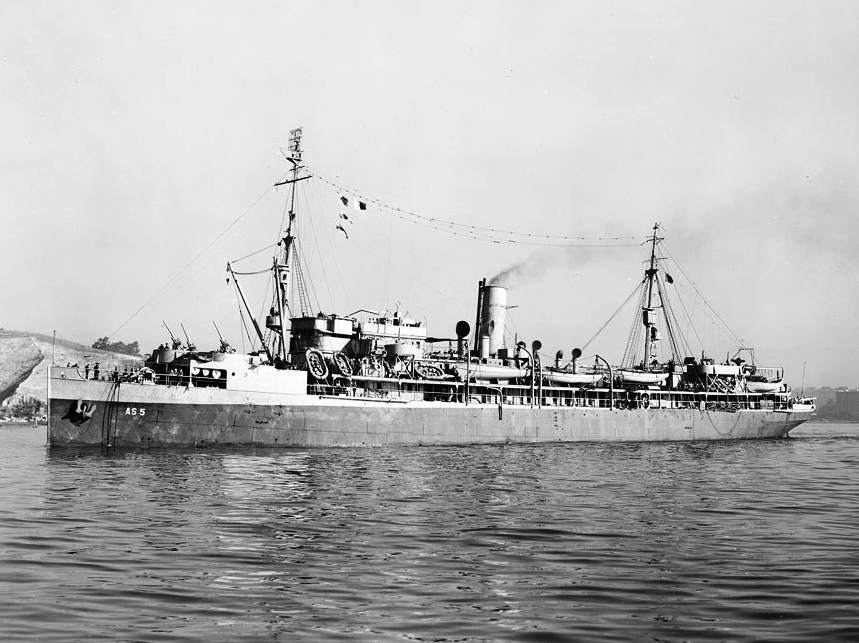
- USS Beaver (AS-5) on 20 September 1943

History

United States
- Name: Beaver
- Builder: Newport News Shipbuilding and Drydock Company
- Cost: $1,300,000 (hull and machinery)
- Acquired: 1 July 1918 from the San Francisco & Portland Steamship Co.
- Commissioned: 1 October 1918
- Decommissioned: 17 July 1946
- Stricken: 15 August 1946
- Fate: Sold 28 August 1950

General characteristics
- Type: Submarine tender
- Displacement: 5,970 long tons (6,070 t)
- Length: 380 ft (120 m)
- Beam: 47 ft (14 m)
- Draft: 21 ft (6.4 m)
- Speed: 16.5 knots (30.6 km/h; 19.0 mph)
- Complement: 373 officers and enlisted
- Armament: 4 × 5 in (130 mm) guns; 2 × 3 in (76 mm) guns; 2 × 1-pounders; 2 × machine gun

USS Beaver (AS-5) was a submarine tender which served in the United States Navy from 1918 to 1946.

== Construction and acquisition ==
Beaver was built in 1910, as a steel-hulled, single-screw, freight and passenger steamer at Newport News, Virginia, by the Newport News Shipbuilding Co. for the Union Pacific Railroad Company. She was purchased from the San Francisco & Portland Steamship Co. on 1 July 1918, for service in the U.S. Navy during World War I and given the classification Id. No. 2302. She was converted to a submarine tender at the Mare Island Navy Yard and was commissioned there on 1 October 1918.

To prepare her to serve as mobile repair and maintenance facility for submarine squadrons, the yard workers installed a machine shop, electrical plant, battery shop, and refrigerator units inside the ship. Since her duties included providing boat services to submarines, the tender carried four motor launches, three motor boats, and five smaller craft.

== Transfer to Pacific and 1920s ==
Assigned to the Pacific Station, her first service was to escort four of the newly constructed O-class submarines (O-boats) from San Pedro Submarine Base, San Pedro, Los Angeles, to Coco Solo in the Canal Zone. There she was assigned as tender to Submarine Division 14 (SubDiv 14). At this time, because diesel submarines had limited range and were prone to engine failures, their operations were generally confined to the coastal waters off American submarine bases. Before the war, there was only one submarine tender in commission and only three submarine bases in operation: one at New London, Connecticut; another at San Pedro, Los Angeles, and the third at Coco Solo in Panama.

In order to expand operations and provide bases for the growing numbers of submarines being built during World War I, the Navy commissioned Beaver and four other tenders and began looking for new base locations. In the Pacific, with Japan viewed as the major threat to American security, naval and military planners began building up the defenses of Hawaii and other possessions.

In Hawaii, four F-boats had been stationed at Honolulu and at Kuahua Island in Pearl Harbor from 21 July 1914. Their crews had built a small pier at the latter location before returning to the west coast on 14 November 1915. In order to improve this facility and create a permanent submarine base at Pearl Harbor, Beaver received orders to Hawaii in early 1919. She escorted six of the new R-boats from San Pedro to Oahu that spring, arriving at Kuahua Island in early July. The tender's crew then helped the submariners build an administrative building, a mess hall, and shops to service and overhaul the boats.

The following year, Beaver was ordered east to tend Atlantic Fleet submarines. Departing the Hawaiian Islands on 18 February 1920, she transited the Panama Canal and arrived at Cristóbal, Colón on 25 March. From there, she proceeded to Kingston, Jamaica, and Havana, Cuba, before arriving at Hampton Roads, Virginia on 10 April. After repairs at the Philadelphia Navy Yard from 12 April-14 May followed by two weeks of liberty at New York, the tender then escorted submarines R-11, R-12, R-13, and R-14 from New London to the Panama Canal from 3–27 June.

She spent the next year operating on "detached service", presumably providing repair and support services to submarines up and down the east coast. On 17 July 1920, the Navy adopted the alphanumeric system of hull classification and identification, and Beaver was designated AS-5. The tender's only unusual duty came in September, when she assisted the unsuccessful attempt to salvage submarine S-5 that had sunk off the Delaware Capes on the 1st.

In December 1920, Beaver received orders to repeat her 1919 service by escorting six S-boats of SubDiv 18 to the Pacific. This time, however, she was to convoy them all the way to the Philippine Islands. After several months of preparation, the division sailed via the Panama Canal and San Pedro, California, to Hawaii. From there, the tender and her charges made the long non-stop run from Hawaii to Guam. After a stop for fuel and supplies at Apra, the division arrived off Sangley Point in Manila Bay on 1 December 1921. Over the next six months, the tender's crew helped improve the submarine base at Cavite and supported local operations by the division's diesel boats.

On 5 June 1922, Beaver sailed for the west coast via the "Great Circle Course" across the central Pacific. In between visits to Guam and Hawaii, she paid a brief call at Wake Island on the 19th to make a survey of the island. One officer on the survey team, Lieutenant Commander Sherwood Picking from the Aeronautical Test Laboratory in Washington, D.C., later wrote, from "a strategic point of view, Wake Island could not be better located, dividing as it does with Midway, the passage from Honolulu to Guam into almost exact thirds." The survey concluded that some dredging and blasting would be necessary for Wake Island to serve as a submarine base.

After reaching San Pedro on 14 July, the tender received orders to continue on to the east coast. Departing San Pedro on the 25th, Beaver escorted eight H-boats and four L-boats south toward the Panama Canal. As the submarines were small, and suffered from engine breakdowns, the tender had to tow as many as three submarines at a time during the long stretches between ports. The convoy stopped at Magdalena Bay and Acapulco in Mexico and at Corinto, Nicaragua, before mooring at Coco Solo in the Canal Zone on 28 August. Following two weeks of repairs, the convoy transited the canal on 11 September and arrived at Hampton Roads, Virginia, via Key West, Florida, on the 29th.

Assigned to SubDiv 17, the tender spent the next six months operating in Atlantic waters. She escorted her submarine charges to Norfolk, Virginia, New York, Newport, Rhode Island, and Portsmouth that fall, before ending the year at the submarine base in New London. Transferred to SubDiv 11, Beaver then convoyed that division to the West Indies in January 1923 for the annual "fleet problem", the fleet maneuvers that served as the culmination of the training year. In February–March, in company with Camden and Savannah, the submarine tender supported operations in the Gulf of Panama as the submarines attempted to "defend the Canal Zone" in war games against the Battle Fleet. In April, the Commander, Submarine Division, Pacific, transferred his flag from Camden to Beaver. The tender then joined SubDiv 16, consisting of six of the new S-boats, and escorted them back through the canal and on to San Pedro, arriving there at the end of the month.

On 9 June, Beaver and four of her S-boats sailed north for a cruise in Alaskan waters. This was the first visit by American submarines to this region, and the squadron spent nearly three months surveying the straits and coastal islands for a possible submarine base. In mid-August, after a stop at Vancouver, British Columbia, the squadron visited Astoria, Oregon, to look over a site contemplated for another submarine base. Finally, Beaver and her charges returned to San Pedro on 25 August. The tender supported local submarine operations off California for the remainder of the year.

On 2 January 1924, Beaver, in company with ten submarines of SubDivs 16 and 17, steamed south from San Pedro for another fleet exercise in the West Indies. Unlike the previous spring, however, this time the submarines sailed in company with the Battle Fleet, which had been operating in the Pacific since the previous year. The submarines first made the long non-stop cruise to Balboa, Canal Zone, on the Pacific side of the transisthmian waterway. Then the entire force steamed thence through the canal to participate in extensive war games in the West Indies with the Scouting Fleet. In addition to operations at sea, the submarine divisions visited Haiti, the Virgin Islands, and Trinidad. The tender and her charges returned to San Diego, via the canal, in May 1924 and remained there through the end of the year.

Beaver got underway from Mare Island, California on 14 April 1925, bound ultimately for the Asiatic Station. In company with five submarines of SubDiv 16, she first stopped at Honolulu for maneuvers with the Battle Fleet in Hawaiian waters. The following month, after turning over the flag of Pacific Submarines to Savannah, Beaver sailed for the Philippines with six S-boats of SubDiv 16, arriving at Manila on 12 July.

Over the next seven years, Beaver tended SubDiv 16 in Philippine and Chinese waters. As service on the Asiatic Station was influenced by the monsoon seasons, the tender followed a standard pattern of annual operations. In the spring and summer, she shifted base from Manila Bay to Qingdao, China, and supported submarine cruises up and down the Chinese coast. These included stops at Hong Kong, Shantou, Amoy, Shanghai, Weihai, and Tianjin. From the latter port, leave parties often visited Beijing. In the fall and winter, as the monsoons moved southwest toward French Indochina and the Dutch East Indies, the tender and her charges shifted back to the Philippines for operations out of Cavite.

== 1930s ==
Before steaming to China in 1930, Beaver led SubDiv 16 on a cruise through the southern Philippine Islands. Following port visits to Iloilo on Panay and Zamboanga on Mindanao, the submarine division then visited the Sultan of Sulu at Jolo, an island in the Sulu archipelago. On its return to Manila from China late that year, the division surveyed the unfamiliar waters off the east coast of Formosa. Beaver departed Manila on 1 May 1932, in company with six S-boats from SubDiv 9, and sailed for Hawaii, arriving in Pearl Harbor on the 30th. There, while submarines S-30, S-31, S-32, S-33, S-34, and S-35 were placed in reserve commission, Beaver was reassigned to Submarine Squadron 4 (SubRon 4).

For the next seven years, Beaver remained in Hawaiian waters, tending submarines during local operations and steaming occasionally to Wake Island, Midway, and French Frigate Shoals for deployment exercises. The tender also participated in every fleet exercise held in Hawaiian waters during the 1930s. She missed the last fleet problem in 1940, however, as the tender was in San Diego during February for a major overhaul. Intended to improve her capability to support submarines overseas, Beaver's modernization also included the installation of new repair equipment and the latest communications gear.

The tender sailed for the east coast in November 1940, passing through the Panama Canal and arriving at her new home port of New London, Connecticut, at the end of that month. There, she joined the growing numbers of warships in the Atlantic following the September 1940 "destroyers-for-bases" deal between the United States and Britain. The agreement, which transferred 50 "overage" destroyers to the Royal Navy in exchange for 99-year leases on bases in the Western Hemisphere, allowed American forces to move into particularly important islands in the West Indies. Over the next year, naval engineers and civilian contractors set up a network of seaplane and naval bases to protect the approaches to the Panama Canal.

During 1940, Beaver helped establish a submarine base at Gregerie Channel in St. Thomas, Virgin Islands, and operated at the seaplane base near Hamilton, Bermuda. She also served as temporary flagship for Atlantic Fleet submarines before becoming the tender for SubRon 7 based at New London in April. Following American entry into World War II on 7 December 1941, Beaver led 11 R-boats to the seaplane base in Bermuda, arriving there on the 10th. For the next nine months, the tender alternated between Bermuda and New London, supporting submarine patrols along the Caribbean-Bermuda-New England shipping lanes and assisting antisubmarine training for American destroyers.

== World War II in the Atlantic ==
On 3 September 1942, Beaver and six submarines formed SubRon 50 at New London, a special unit intended for Operation "Torch" – the planned November landings in French North Africa. In October, while five of her submarines sailed with Task Group 34.11 (TG 34.11) for operations off North Africa, Beaver joined convoy HX 212, bound for the United Kingdom. On 24 October, the 48-ship convoy ran into a patrol line of German U-boats which closed to attack. Starting on the 26th, and continuing over the next two nights, seven U-boats attacked the convoy. Although the convoy escorts – including the Coast Guard cutter Campbell and three British Commonwealth corvettes – drove off most of the attackers, three merchant ships were sunk and another two damaged by U-boats that broke through the defensive screen. The rest of the ships, including Beaver, came under RAF air cover out of Iceland on the 28th and arrived at the Firth of Clyde on 1 November.

The submarine tender then steamed to the Rosneath naval base near Rosneath, where she established a temporary submarine base for SubRon 50. After the squadron's submarines returned from "Torch" operations, where they had conducted reconnaissance patrols off the beaches, they were assigned patrol areas in the Bay of Biscay. Between December 1942 and March 1943, the submarines searched for blockade runners out of neutral Spanish ports. Starting in April, they patrolled off Norway, Iceland, and then the mid-Atlantic, searching for enemy U-boats and waiting in case the German surface fleet broke out from its Scandinavian bases.

== World War II Pacific Service and fate ==
On 15 July 1943, Beaver sailed for the United States and, after an uneventful passage, arrived in New York later that month. Needed to support the growing American submarine offensive in the Pacific, the tender got underway 10 days later for San Diego, via the Panama Canal. After a brief overhaul in San Diego, she sailed for Alaska on 20 September. Assigned to SubRon 45 at Dutch Harbor, Beaver furnished tender services to North Pacific Force submarines when they returned from patrols in the northern Kurils and the Sea of Okhotsk. Her crew also helped establish and run a submarine base at Attu.

On 12 February 1944, the tender returned to San Diego, where her crew set up a submarine training school in conjunction with the Navy's West Coast Sound School. Beaver remained at San Diego – tending S-boats during training operations – until late June 1945. Ordered into drydock for conversion to an internal combustion engine repair ship, she was redesignated ARG-19 on 25 June 1945. Following two months of repair and conversion, she departed San Diego on 28 August for duty with the service force in occupied Japan. The ship remained in Japanese waters – tending the multitude of small craft in use by the Navy – until March 1946, when she crossed the China Sea and steamed up the Yangtze River in China and then on to the Huangpu River where she remained until May 1946. She then returned to the west coast, anchoring in Puget Sound, in the state of Washington.

Beaver was decommissioned on 17 July 1946 and turned over to the War Shipping Administration for disposal on 5 August. Her name was struck from the Naval Vessel Register on 15 August, and she was sold to the Boston Metals Corp. for scrapping on 28 August 1950.

== Awards ==
- World War I Victory Medal
- American Defense Service Medal
- American Campaign Medal
- European–African–Middle Eastern Campaign Medal
- Asiatic–Pacific Campaign Medal
- World War II Victory Medal
- Navy Occupation Service Medal
- China Service Medal
