= United States H-class submarine =

United States Navy submarine class

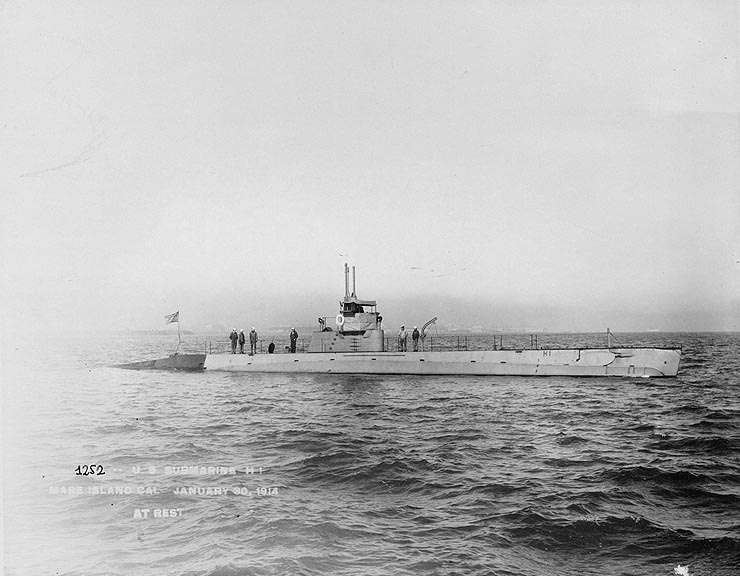
- USS H-1, ex-Seawolf, off the Mare Island Navy Yard, California, 30 January 1914

Class overview
- Name: H class
- Builders: Electric Boat (design); Union Iron Works, San Francisco, California (H-1 & H-2); The Moran Company, Seattle, Washington (H-3); British Pacific Construction and Engineering Company, Vancouver, British Columbia / Puget Sound Navy Yard, Bremerton, Washington (H-4 to H-9)
- Operators: United States Navy
- Preceded by: G class
- Succeeded by: K class
- Built: 1911–1918
- In commission: 1913–1922
- Completed: 9
- Lost: 1
- Retired: 8

General characteristics
- Type: Submarine
- Displacement: 358 long tons (364 t) surfaced; 467 long tons (474 t) submerged
- Length: 150 ft 4 in (45.82 m)
- Beam: 15 ft 10 in (4.83 m)
- Draft: 12 ft 5 in (3.78 m)
- Installed power: 950 hp (710 kW) (diesel engines); 600 hp (450 kW) (electric motors)
- Propulsion: 2 × NELSECO diesel engines; 2 × Electro Dynamic electric motors; 2 × 60-cell batteries; 2 × Propellers
- Speed: 14 kn (26 km/h; 16 mph) surfaced; 10.5 kn (19.4 km/h; 12.1 mph) submerged
- Range: 2,300 nmi (4,300 km; 2,600 mi) at 11 kn (20 km/h; 13 mph) surfaced; 100 nmi (190 km; 120 mi) at 5 kn (9.3 km/h; 5.8 mph) submerged
- Test depth: 200 ft (61 m)
- Capacity: 11,800 US gal (45,000 L; 9,800 imp gal) fuel
- Complement: 2 officers; 23 enlisted
- Armament: 4 × 18 inch (450 mm) bow torpedo tubes (8 torpedoes)

The United States H-class submarines were Electric Boat design EB26A and EB26R design coastal patrol submarines used by the United States Navy.

The first three submarines of the class were laid down in March–April 1911, as Seawolf, Nautilus, and Garfish, and were renamed H-1, H-2, and H-3, while still under construction on 17 November 1911, as part of a forcewide submarine redesignation. They were commissioned in December 1913/January 1914.

In 1915, the Imperial Russian Navy had ordered 18 H-class submarines built to a modified EB602 design. Ordered from the Electric Boat Company, they were to be built in Canada, at a temporary shipyard near Barnet, Vancouver, British Columbia, to avoid US neutrality concerns, which had derailed the delivery of ten similar submarines to the British. The shipyard was owned by the British Pacific Construction and Engineering Company. Twelve were delivered, and served as the American Holland-class submarines, but the shipment of the final six was held up, pending the outcome of the Russian Revolution of 1917, and the boats were stored in knockdown condition at their construction yard. All six were purchased by the US Navy on 20 May 1918, and assembled at Puget Sound Navy Yard, before being commissioned as H-4 to H-9, in late 1918.

H-1 ran aground and was wrecked off the coast of Mexico, on 12 March 1920, while the remaining eight submarines were decommissioned in late 1922, and laid up in the Reserve Fleet. Finally stricken from the Navy List in 1930, they were sold for scrap in 1931 and 1933.

== Design ==
These vessels included some features intended to increase underwater speed that were standard on US submarines of this era, including a small conning tower and fairwater, and a rotating cap over the torpedo tube muzzles. For extended surface runs, the small fairwater and its open bridge was augmented with a temporary piping-and-canvas structure. US Navy tactical employment of these submarines in this era did not require crash dives, so the considerable time it took to dismantle and store below the temporary bridge structure was not considered a liability. Experience in World War I showed that the piping and canvas structure was inadequate in the North Atlantic weather, and USN submarines serving overseas in that war, E, K, and L-classes, had the forward structure of the fairwater modified with a metal "chariot" shield. Starting in 1918-1919, with lessons learned from overseas experience, US submarines had bridges more suited to surfaced operations in rough weather.

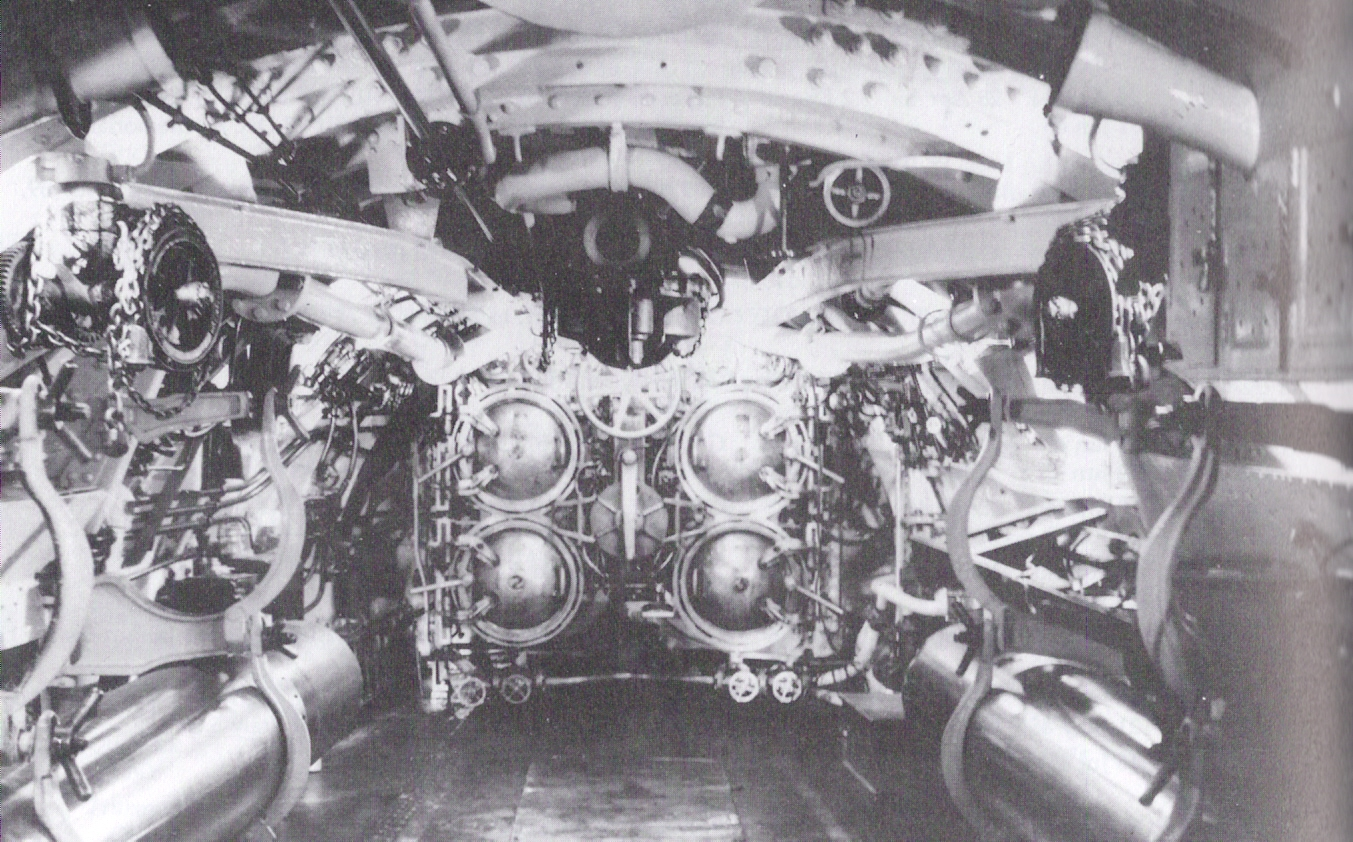
The torpedo room of H-5 in 1919. The breeches of the four 18 inch (450 mm) torpedo tubes are at center.

The streamlined, rotating torpedo tube muzzle cap eliminated the drag that muzzle holes would otherwise cause. In the stowed position, the submarine appears to have no torpedo tubes, as the holes in the cap are covered by the bow stem. This feature remained standard on Electric Boat designed submarines through the O-class, with the exception of the L-class and the M-1. The L and M-class boats pioneered the use of shutter-style doors for the torpedo tubes, which then became the standard for all USN submarines starting with the S-class patrol submarines of the 1920's.

The EB26A design, originally built for the USN, H-1 to H-3, had a watertight bulkhead separating the torpedo room from the forward battery compartment. The six boats of the H-4 to H-9 group were built to the EB602L design, EB26R for the USN, for export to Russia. When seized by the US, they were completed to that slightly modified design. The biggest difference was that they did not have the bulkhead between the torpedo room and the forward battery, essentially making it one large compartment.

Since the acquisition of the H-4 to H-9 group was delayed, other types had already been acquired by the USN, so these last six boats were assigned hull numbers that fell into the middle of the S-class (147-152).

== Boats in class ==
The following ships of the class were constructed:

Construction data
Ship name	Hull class and no.	Builder	Laid down	Launched	Comm.	Decomm.	Renamed	Rename date	Reclass. hull no.	Reclass. hull no. date	Fate
Seawolf	Submarine No. 28	Union Iron Works, San Francisco, California	22 March 1911	6 May 1913	1 December 1913		H-1	17 November 1911	SS-28	17 July 1920	Grounded, 12 March 1920, sold for scrapping, June 1920
Nautilus	Submarine No. 29	Union Iron Works, San Francisco, California	23 March 1911	4 June 1913	1 December 1913	23 October 1922	H-2	17 November 1911	SS-29	17 July 1920	Sold for scrapping, 1 September 1931
Garfish	Submarine No. 30	The Moran Company, Seattle, Washington	3 April 1911	3 July 1913	16 January 1914	23 October 1922	H-3	17 November 1911	SS-30	17 July 1920	Sold for scrapping, 14 September 1931
H-4	Submarine No. 147	Puget Sound Navy Yard, Bremerton, Washington	12 May 1918	9 October 1918	24 October 1918	15 August 1919			SS-147	17 July 1920	Sold for scrapping, 14 September 1931
H-5	Submarine No. 148	Puget Sound Navy Yard, Bremerton, Washington	12 May 1918	24 September 1918	30 September 1918	20 October 1922			SS-148	17 July 1920	Sold for scrapping, 28 November 1933
H-6	Submarine No. 149	Puget Sound Navy Yard, Bremerton, Washington	14 May 1918	26 August 1918	9 September 1918	23 October 1922			SS-149	17 July 1920	Sold for scrapping, 28 November 1933
H-7	Submarine No. 150	Puget Sound Navy Yard, Bremerton, Washington	15 May 1918	17 October 1918	24 October 1918	23 October 1922			SS-150	17 July 1920	Sold for scrapping, 28 November 1933
H-8	Submarine No. 151	Puget Sound Navy Yard, Bremerton, Washington	25 May 1918	14 November 1918	18 November 1918	17 November 1922			SS-151	17 July 1920	Sold for scrapping, 28 November 1933
H-9	Submarine No. 152	Puget Sound Navy Yard, Bremerton, Washington	1 June 1918	23 November 1918	25 November 1918	3 November 1922			SS-152	17 July 1920	Sold for scrapping, 28 November 1933

== See also ==
- American Holland-class submarine

== Bibliography ==
- Friedman, Norman (1995). US Submarines through 1945: An Illustrated Design History. Annapolis, Maryland: Naval Institute Press. ISBN 1-55750-263-3.
- Hendren, Richard H. (December 2021). "The History of the H-class Submarines and Archeology of the Submarine H-1 (Ex Seawolf) (1913-1920)" (PDF).
- Hedman, Ric; Johnston, David (8 May 2025). "H-class page". Pigboats.com.
- Hedman, Ric; Johnston, David (3 April 2025a). "H-1 & H-3 Plans page". Pigboats.com.
- Hedman, Ric; Johnston, David (3 July 2025b). "H-4 thru H-9 Plans page". Pigboats.com.
- Priolo, Gary. "Sea Wolf / H-1 (SS-28)". NavSource.
- Mohl, Michael. "Nautilus / H-2 (SS-29)". NavSource.
- Priolo, Gary. "Garfish / H-3 (SS-30)". NavSource.
- Priolo, Gary. "H-4 (SS-147)". NavSource.
- Priolo, Gary. "H-5 (SS-148)". NavSource.
- Priolo, Gary. "H-6 (SS-149)". NavSource.
- Priolo, Gary. "H-7 (SS-150)". NavSource.
- Priolo, Gary. "H-8 (SS-151)". NavSource.
- Priolo, Gary. "H-9 (SS-152)". NavSource.
