= Municipal Warehouse No. 1 =

- U.S. National Register of Historic Places
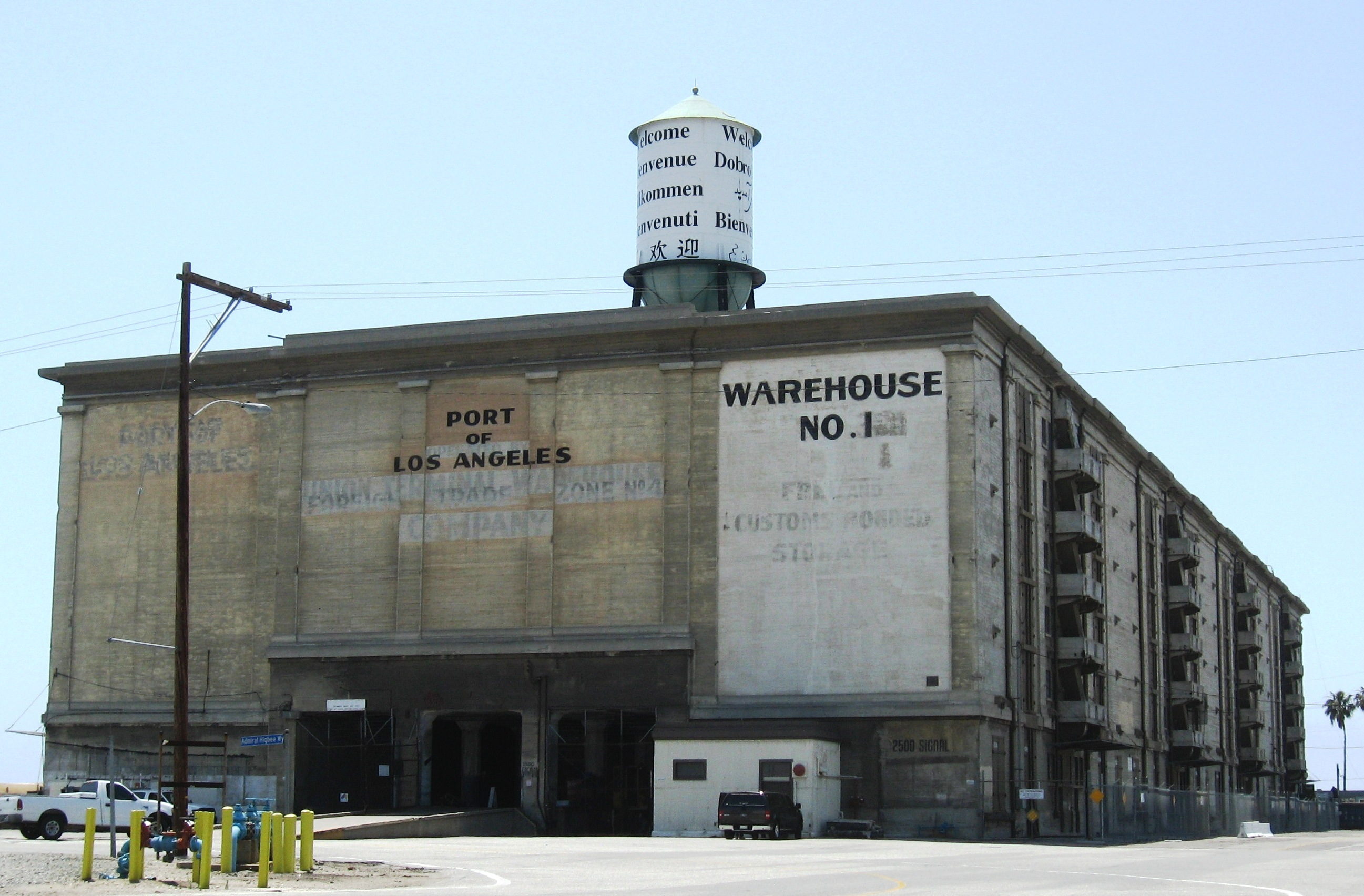
- Municipal Warehouse No. 1 in 2008

- Location within the Los Angeles metropolitan area Location within California Location within the United States
- Location: 2500 Signal St., San Pedro, California
- Coordinates: 33°43′15″N 118°16′20″W
- Architect: Peter Ficker
- NRHP reference No.: 00000386 Owner
- Added to NRHP: April 21, 2000

Municipal Warehouse No. 1 is a six-story warehouse built in 1917 on the outermost point of land on the main channel at the Port of Los Angeles. It played an important part in the establishment of Los Angeles as a major center of international trade and was listed on the National Register of Historic Places for its role in the development of the region's international trade and commerce.

== Construction and early years ==
The development of the Panama Canal led Los Angeles business leaders to believe that, if modern port facilities could be built, the world's commercial fleet would descend on Los Angeles. When the canal opened in August 1914, World War I had postponed the city's plans. However, the city's Municipal Wharf No. 1 was nearly complete in 1914, and harbor officials next turned their attention the construction of a large bonded warehouse to handle the "sea caravans" that were expected to crowd the harbor at the end of the war.

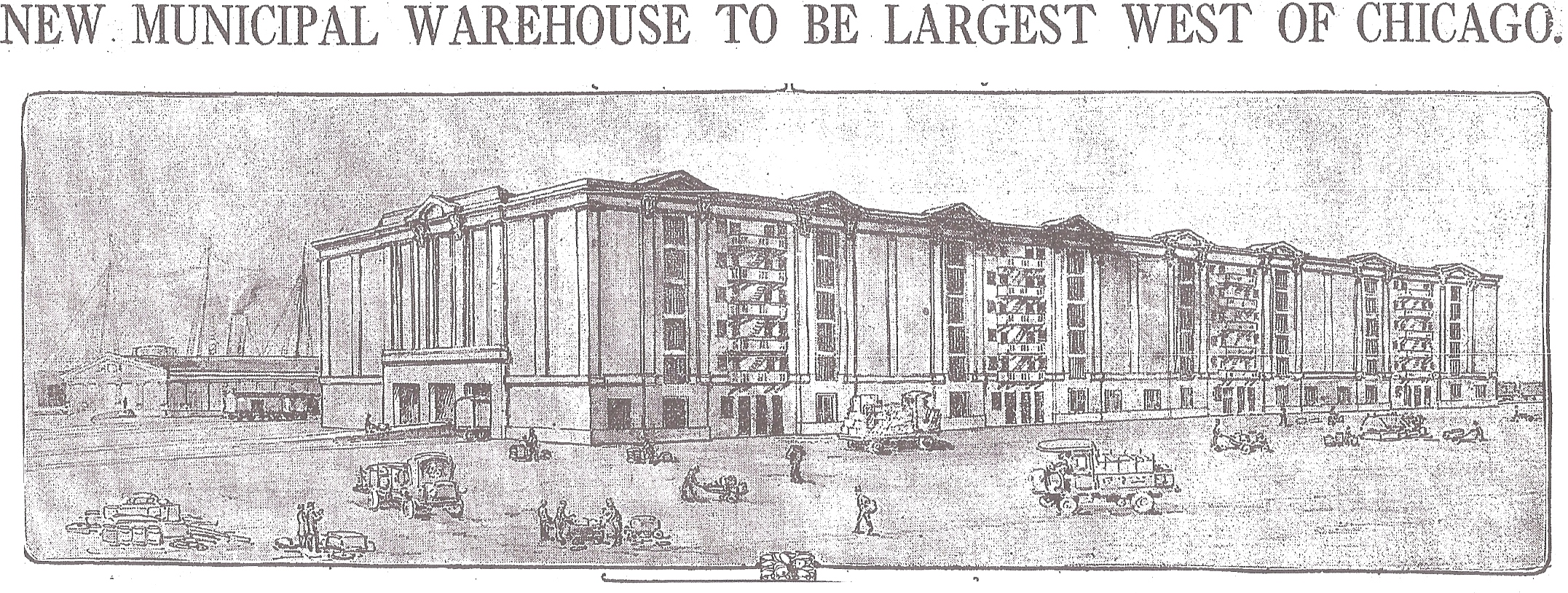
Plans for the new Municipal Warehouse, published in the Los Angeles Times, Dec. 6, 1914

By late 1914, foundation tests and paving activities were underway for a six-story warehouse to be built on Municipal Dock No. 1. And in December 1914, the Harbor Commission unveiled the structural plans prepared by Chief Harbor Engineer S.A. Jubb for the "mammoth new warehouse." The Los Angeles Times reported at the time on the proposed design as follows:

"The massiveness and character of the structure, of course, preclude the idea of architectural beauty and make any considerable degree of ornamentation undesirable. Both commissions, however, are desirous that the warehouse shall be more than merely a gigantic fireproof box with four walls, a roof and various openings. Considerable study, therefore, has been given to the treatment of cornice and wall panels, to the end that as pleasing and symmetrical an effect may be obtained as is consistent with the purposes and proportions of the building.
The warehouse will be of reinforced concrete construction and six stories in height. It will be 480 feet (150 m) in length and 150 feet (46 m) wide, being the largest structure of its kind ever erected west of Chicago. ... The warehouse is to stand at the seaward end of the city's present great outer harbor dock ..."

The original projected cost of the structure was $200,000 for the structural work and another $50,000 for equipment, though the final cost was nearly double -- $475,792.53. When plans were finalized in 1915, the Times reported that the enormous warehouse would require more than 27,000 cubic yards of cement and 1,200 tons of reinforcing steel and would be "by far the largest structure of its kind on the Pacific Coast." The contract for the huge public works project was awarded to the Merchants' Realty and Investment Company of Los Angeles, and "unionites" immediately began making threats to "make trouble for the contractor as soon as work is started on the warehouse." The first foundation piles were driven into the Huntington Fill in August 1915, and by the end of November, more than 3,000 piles had been sunk. The first concrete was poured in January 1916, and the basement and first floor were completed by early April 1916. However, construction was slowed by wartime shortages, and the Times reported in late April that the contractor was considering suspending operations altogether and laying off the 150 men working on the project, due to continuing problems with shortages of lumber, rock and gravel.

When Municipal Warehouse No. 1 opened in April 1917, nearly 100 members of the city's Merchants' and Manufacturers' Association toured the warehouse and were told of its potential to assist them in their business. The Times described the operations at the warehouse as follows:

"Freight received by steamers will be sorted in the transit freight shed and taken into the warehouse on electric trucks. Sixteen electric hoists have been provided to convey the freight to the various lofts in the warehouse. There are nearly twelve acres of floor space in the warehouse, which will be leased by the city merchants and manufacturers. Here goods may be readied for shipment and send direct from the warehouse by rail. Tracks run into the warehouse and elevators are provided to take the goods from the lofts to the loading platforms in the basement."

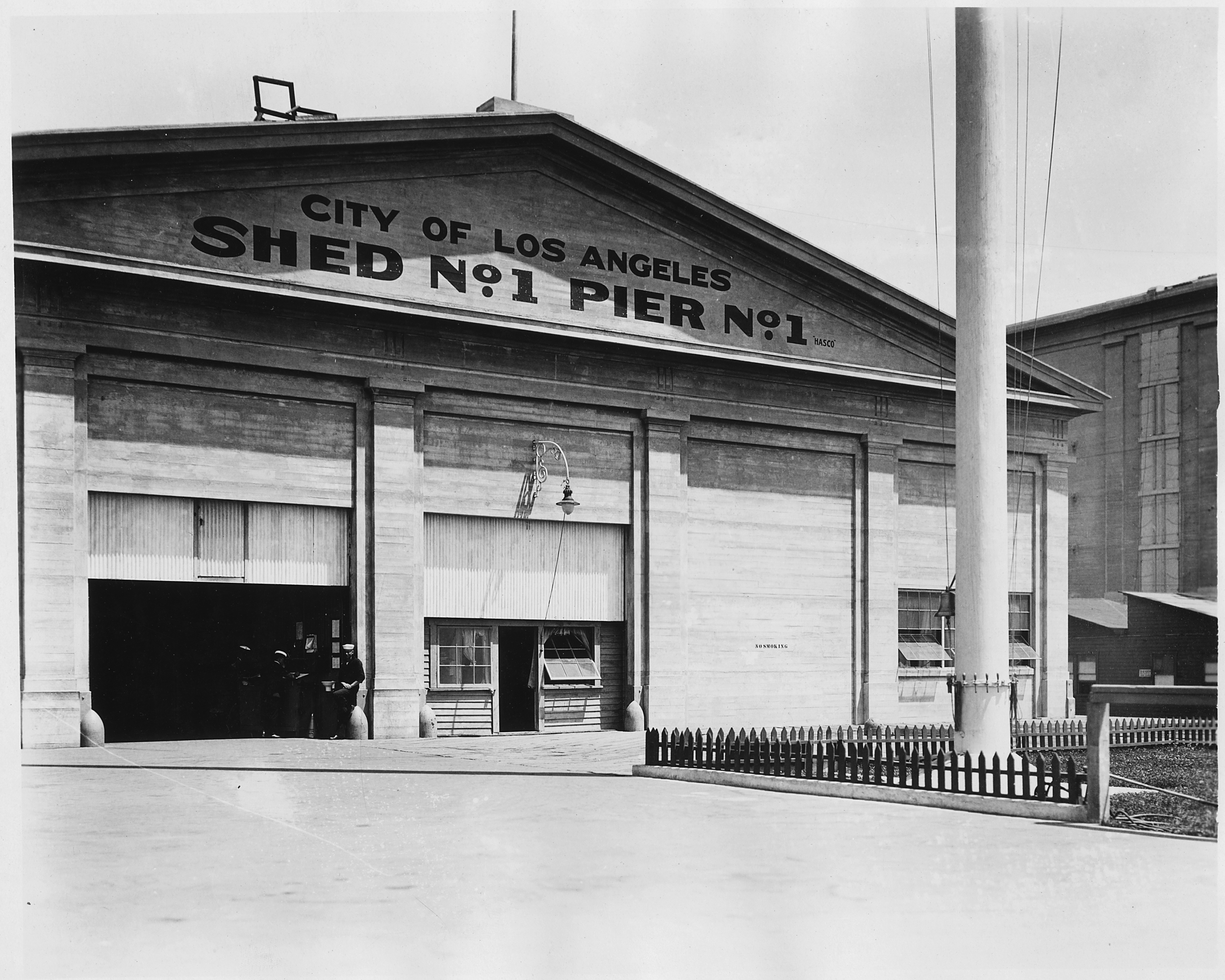
Shed No. 1, Pier No. 1 with warehouse in the background, 1947

The warehouse was the Port's only bonded warehouse for many years and played a significant role in the establishment of the Port of Los Angeles as an international trade hub. The 475,000-square-foot (44,100 m^{2}) structure was built with an interior arcade with room for 24 freight cars.

== Rooftop operations ==
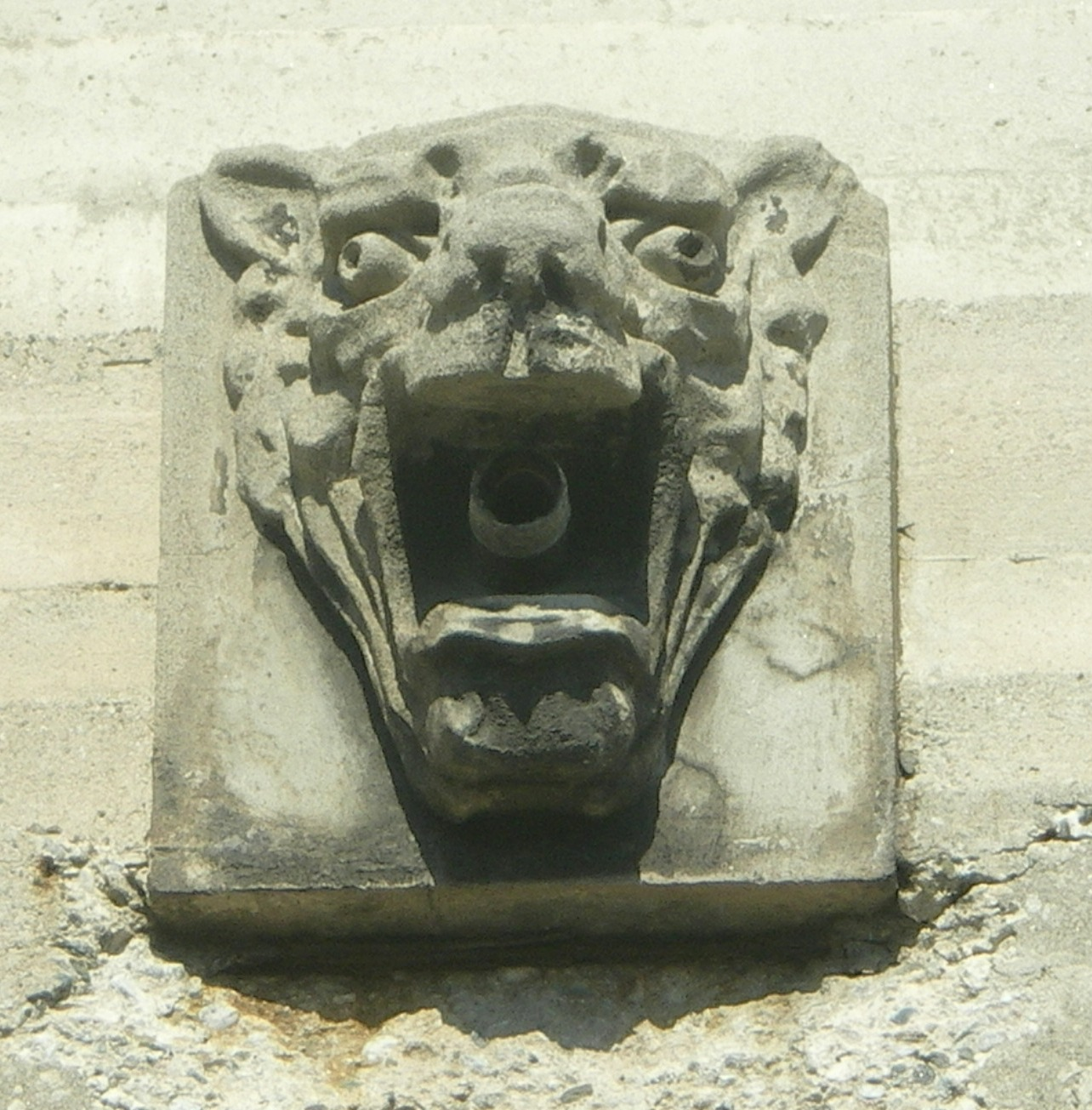
Dozens of these decorative faces adorn the exterior of Municipal Warehouse No. 1

Because of its commanding view of the harbor, the roof of the warehouse has long been the site of various operations. Starting in the early 1920s, the Marine Exchange operated on its roof, providing lookout reports on ships entering and leaving the port. In 1925, the Radio Corporation of America located its harbor receiving station to the top of the massive warehouse. A new four-room lookout station for use by the Marine Exchange was built in 1928 atop the warehouse. The new station had a large circular window giving telescopes a commanding view of the harbor and ocean, and also included a neon red beacon which shed a red glow over the building at night. In 1939, the Los Angeles Times described the Exchange as "a world all its own up there on Warehouse No. 1." In eight-hour shifts, three men manned the Exchange, climbing seven flights of stairs to reach the lookout station. The Times described the station as follows: "In one room with big windows commanding every approach from the sea, there is a large telescope on wheels. It can be pointed in any direction with the touch of a finger. At a little desk looking out over the channel and the harbor sits one of the three men who are on duty as lookouts ..." During World War II, as blackout rules were applied along the coast, the Marine Exchange ceased operations but resumed its lookout operations atop the warehouse in late 1945. In 1964, a new 26 x 32-foot (9.8 m) perch was built atop the warehouse for use by the Marine Exchange. The roof was also the site of a weather observation and signal facility for many years.

== Navy depot, Foreign Trade Zone 4, and historic designation ==
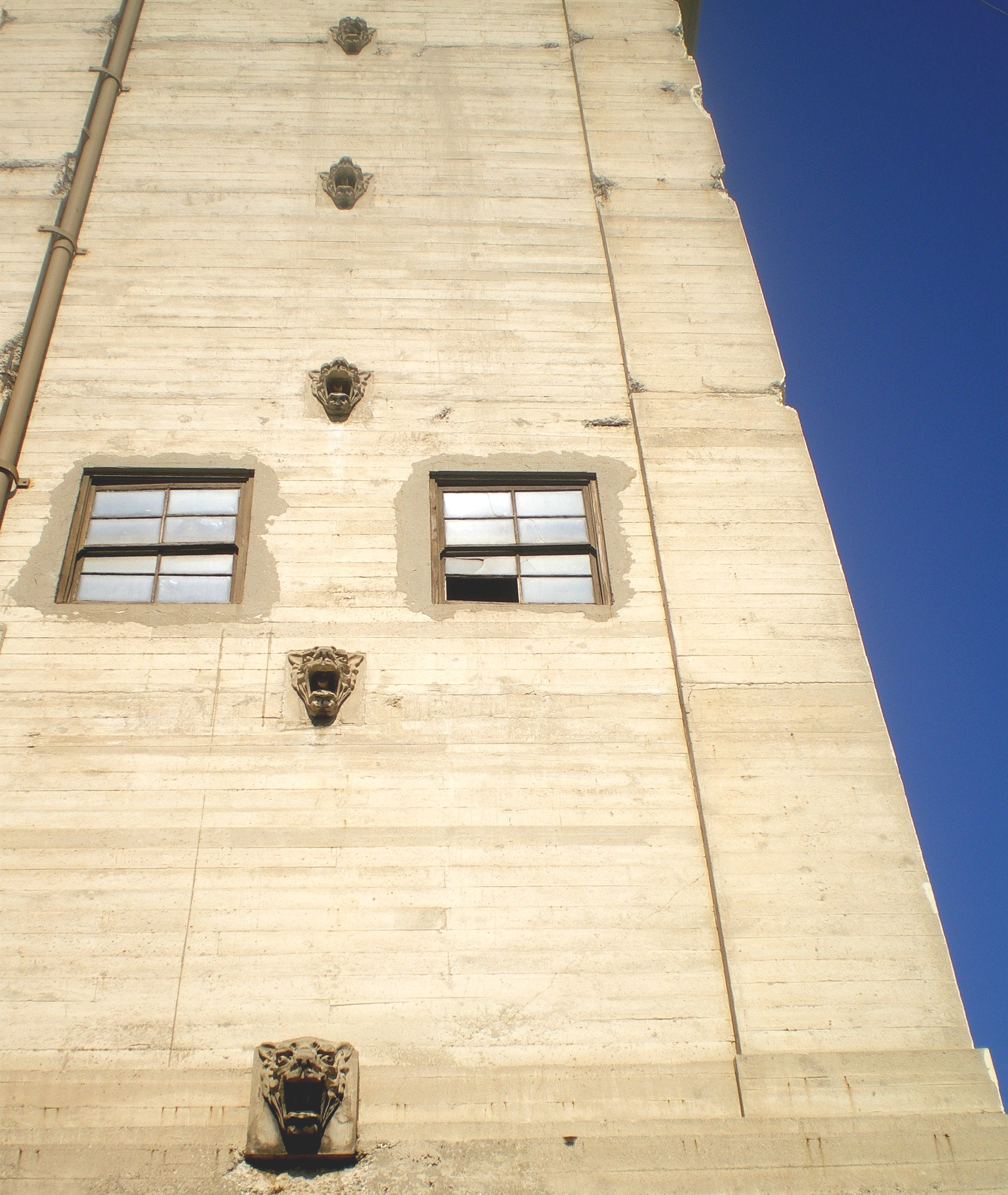
Exterior of Municipal Warehouse No. 1

During World War II, the warehouse was turned over to the U.S. Navy for use as a supply depot. Returned to civilian use after the war, the fourth foreign trade zone in the United States was established at the warehouse in September 1949; it followed the success of such zones in New York, New Orleans and San Francisco. From 1949 to 1956 (when the foreign trade zone was terminated), the warehouse became "in effect a 'foreign island'" or "free city" where important goods could be manipulated, sorted, graded, inspected, and re-exported without payment of duties unless and until they were taken from the warehouse for distribution within the United States. By 1950, more than 100,000 local citizens were employed directly in foreign trade grossing $530 million, and the Los Angeles Foreign Trade Zone at Municipal Warehouse No. 1 was credited with helping Los Angeles become a major center of world trade.

Over the years, as items were held for various customs or other reasons, Municipal Warehouse No. 1 became the home for a number of unusual items. In 1949, a group of camels being imported from Australia for a Shriners convention were held at the warehouse while quarantine requirements were met. And when an American museum imported the railroad car that carried Winston Churchill's body to burial, the railcar got no further than the port and was stored for many years in the Municipal Warehouse No. 1.

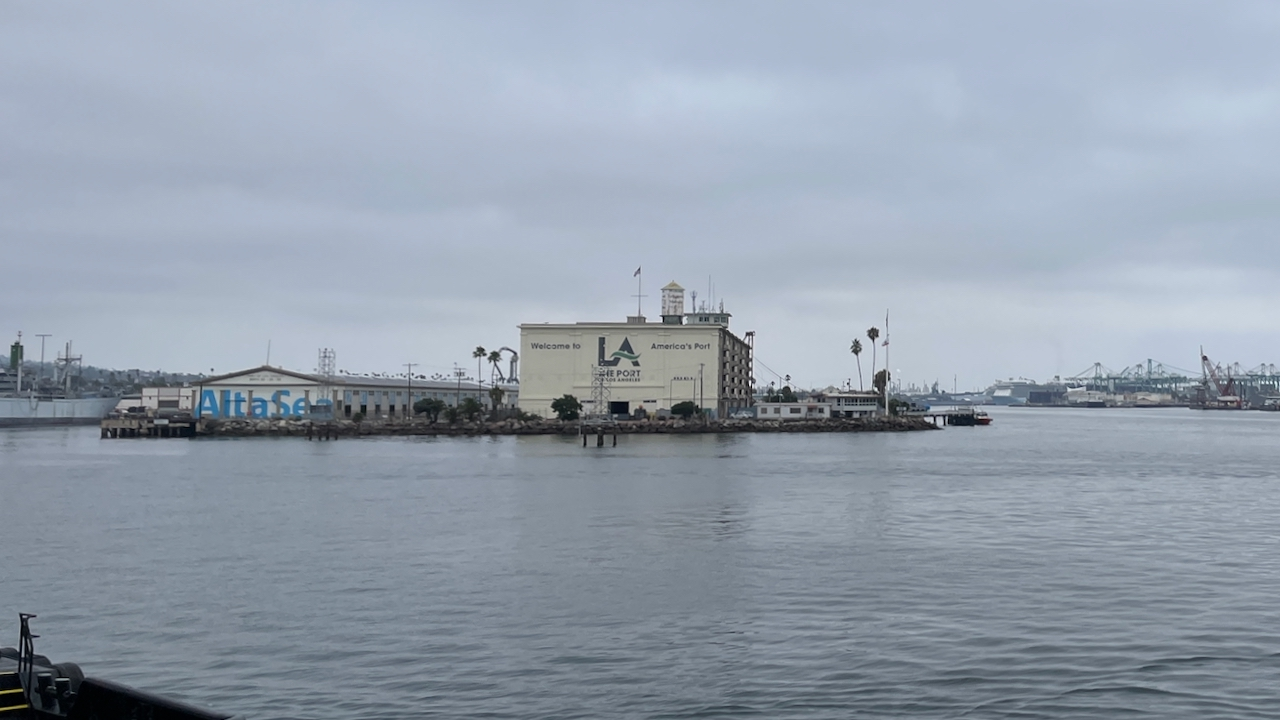
No. 1 as viewed from the channel

In the 1970s, the introduction of cargo containerization eliminated the need for break-bulk warehousing, but Municipal Warehouse No. 1 has continued to be used as a bonded warehouse at the Port. It also serves as a visual landmark for ships entering the Port. In 2000, Municipal Warehouse No. 1 was listed on the National Register of Historic Places based on its contributions to international trade and commerce along the Pacific Coast.

== See also ==
- List of Registered Historic Places in Los Angeles
- List of Los Angeles Historic-Cultural Monuments in the Harbor area
