= USS H-2 =

H-class submarine of the United States

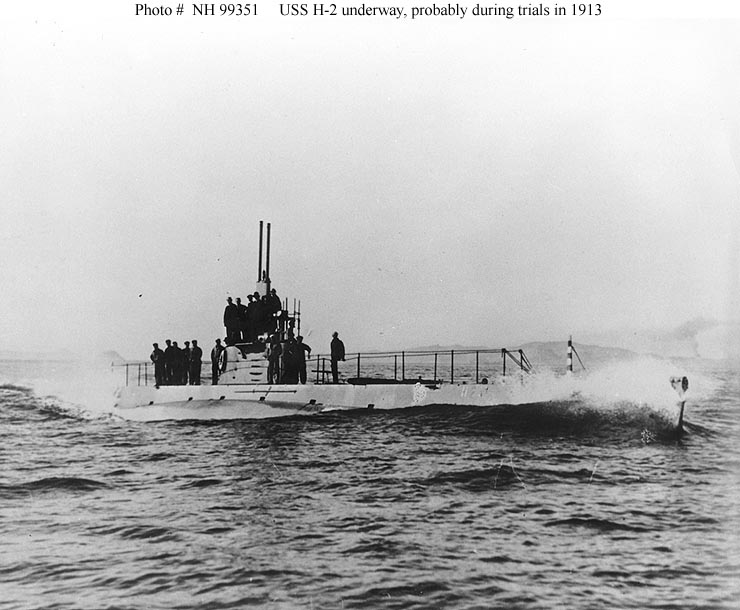
- USS H-2, ex-Nautilus, possibly while running sea trials off California, in 1913

History

United States
- Name: Nautilus
- Namesake: The nautilus
- Builder: Union Iron Works, San Francisco, California
- Cost: $518,608.88 (hull and machinery)
- Laid down: 23 March 1911
- Launched: 4 June 1913
- Commissioned: 1 December 1913
- Decommissioned: 23 October 1922
- Renamed: H-2 (Submarine No.29), 17 November 1911
- Stricken: 18 December 1930
- Identification: Hull symbol: SS-29 (17 July 1920); Call sign: NYD
- Fate: Sold for scrapping, 1 September 1931

General characteristics
- Type: H-class submarine
- Displacement: 358 long tons (364 t) surfaced; 467 long tons (474 t) submerged
- Length: 150 ft 4 in (45.82 m)
- Beam: 15 ft 10 in (4.83 m)
- Draft: 12 ft 5 in (3.78 m)
- Installed power: 950 hp (710 kW) (diesel engines); 600 hp (450 kW) (electric motors)
- Propulsion: 2 × NELSECO diesel engines; 2 × Electro Dynamic electric motors; 2 × 60-cell batteries; 2 × Propellers
- Speed: 14 kn (26 km/h; 16 mph) surfaced; 10.5 kn (19.4 km/h; 12.1 mph) submerged
- Range: 2,300 nmi (4,300 km; 2,600 mi) at 11 kn (20 km/h; 13 mph) surfaced; 100 nmi (190 km; 120 mi) at 5 kn (9.3 km/h; 5.8 mph) submerged
- Test depth: 200 ft (61 m)
- Capacity: 11,800 US gal (45,000 L; 9,800 imp gal) fuel
- Complement: 2 officers; 23 enlisted
- Armament: 4 × 18 inch (450 mm) bow torpedo tubes (8 torpedoes)

USS Nautilus/H-2 (SS-29), also known as "Submarine No. 29", was an H-class submarine of the United States Navy (USN). She was the third ship and first submarine of the USN to bear the name nautilus, a tropical mollusk having a many-chambered, spiral shell with a pearly interior, though she was renamed H-2 prior to launching.

== Design ==
The H-class submarines had an overall length of 150 ft 4 in (45.8 m), a beam of 15 ft 10 in (4.8 m), and a mean draft of 12 ft 5 in (3.8 m). They displaced 358 long tons (364 t) on the surface and 467 long tons (474 t) submerged. They had a diving depth of 200 ft (61.0 m). The boats had a crew of 2 officers and 23 enlisted men.

For surface running, they were powered by two New London Ship & Engine Company 475-brake-horsepower (354 kW) diesel engines, each driving one propeller shaft. When submerged each propeller was driven by two 170-horsepower (127 kW) Electro-Dynamic Company electric motors. They could reach 14 kn (26 km/h; 16 mph) on the surface and 10.5 kn (19.4 km/h; 12.1 mph) underwater. On the surface, the boats had a range of 2,300 nmi (4,300 km; 2,600 mi) at 11 kn (20 km/h; 13 mph) and 100 nmi (190 km; 120 mi) at 5 kn (9.3 km/h; 5.8 mph) submerged.

The boats were armed with four 18-inch (450 mm) torpedo tubes in the bow. They carried four reloads, for a total of eight torpedoes.

== Construction ==
Nautilus's keel was laid down on 23 March 1911, by the Union Iron Works, of San Francisco, California. She was renamed H-2, on 17 November 1911, and launched on 4 June 1913, sponsored by Mrs. William Ranney Sands. H-2 was commissioned on 1 December 1913.

== Service history ==
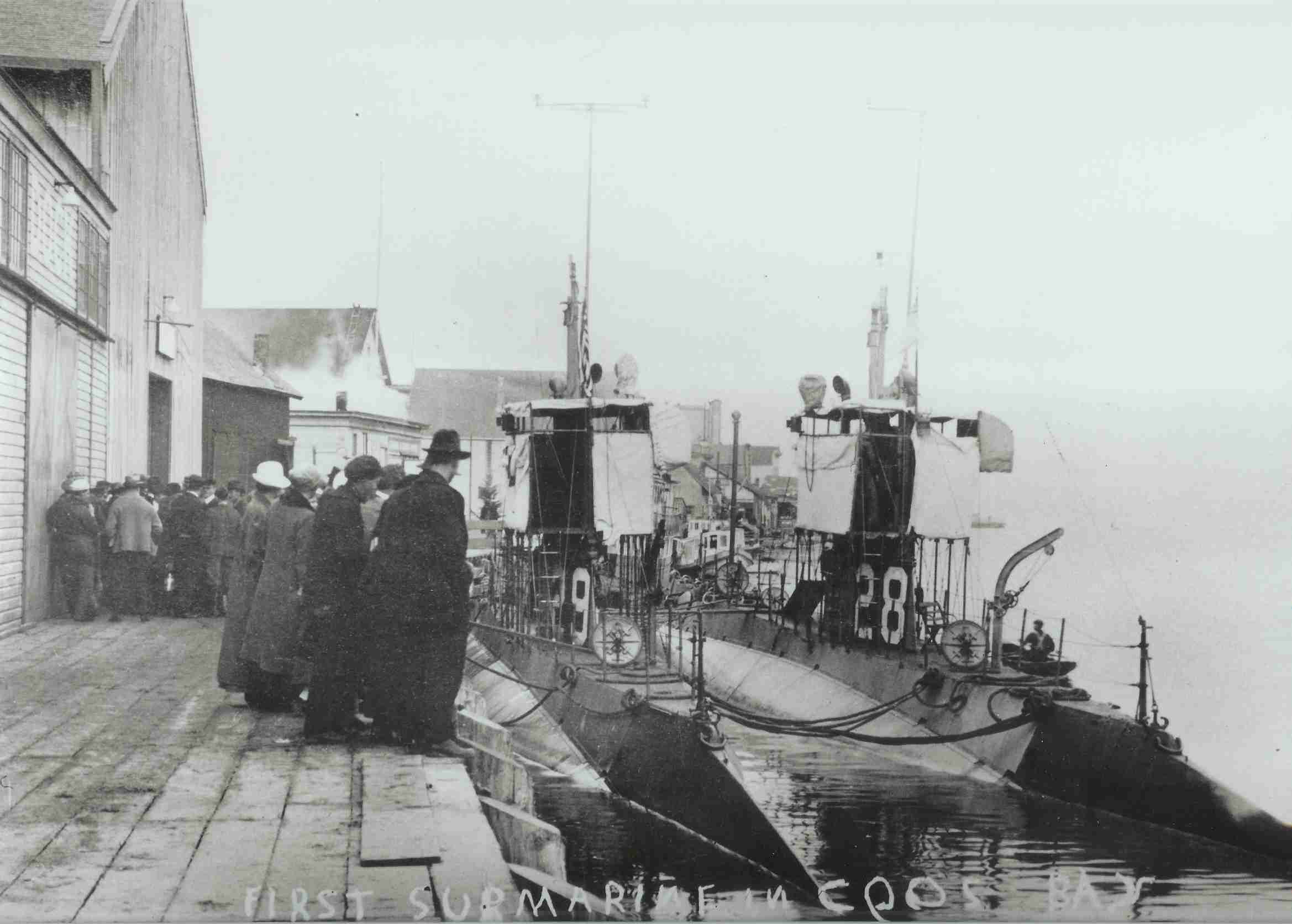
H-1 and H-2, rafted together at Coos Bay, Oregon.

Attached to the Pacific Fleet, H-2 operated along the West Coast, usually in company with H-1, on various exercises and patrols out of San Pedro, California, until October 1917, when she sailed for the East Coast. Transferred to the Atlantic Fleet, as of 9 November 1917, she cruised in the Caribbean Sea, for most of that winter, also conducting special submarine detection tests with aircraft and patrol vessels from Key West, Florida. After having new engines installed at Philadelphia, Pennsylvania, in the spring of 1918, she resumed patrols in the Caribbean, until the end of the war, when she returned to the sub base at New London, Connecticut. From there, she operated in Long Island Sound, often with student officers from the submarine school on board.

Heading west again, H-2 sailed with H-1, on 6 January 1920, touching at several Caribbean ports before transiting the Panama Canal, on 20 February. When H-1 went aground off Santa Margarita Island, on 12 March, H-2 stood by and sent rescue and search parties for survivors, helping to save all but four of her sister ship's crew. She then continued to San Pedro, arriving on 20 March.

Drills and exercises with the Pacific Fleet, and Submarine Division 7 (SubDiv 7), out of San Pedro, were interrupted by an extensive Mare Island Naval Shipyard overhaul in the winter of 1921, after which H-2 returned to the same schedule.

== Fate ==
In company with SubDiv 7, she sailed from San Pedro, on 25 July 1922, reaching Hampton Roads, on 14 September. H-2 decommissioned there on 23 October. Her name was struck from the Naval Vessel Register on 18 December 1930, and she was sold for scrap on 1 September 1931.

== Bibliography ==
- "Table 21 - Ships on Navy List June 30, 1919". Congressional Serial Set. U.S. Government Printing Office: 766. 1921.
- Mohl, Michael. "Nautilus / H-2 (SS-29)". NavSource.
- Friedman, Norman (1995). U.S. Submarines Through 1945: An Illustrated Design History. Annapolis, Maryland: Naval Institute Press. ISBN 1-55750-263-3.
- Gardiner, Robert & Gray, Randal (1985). Conway's All the World's Fighting Ships 1906–1921. Annapolis, Maryland: Naval Institute Press. ISBN 0-85177-245-5.
- "H-2". Dictionary of American Naval Fighting Ships. Navy Department, Naval History and Heritage Command. 24 December 2014. This article incorporates text from this source, which is in the public domain.
