= USS Camden (AS-6) =

Cargo ship of the United States Navy

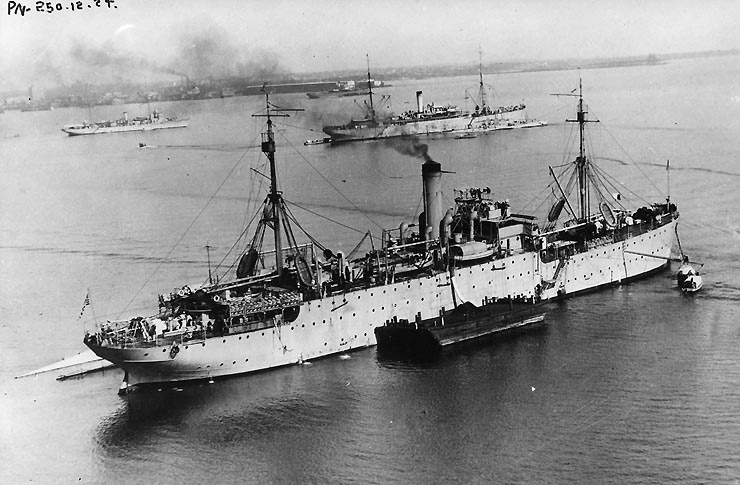
- USS Camden in 1924

History

United States
- Name: USS Camden
- Namesake: Camden, New Jersey
- Builder: Flensburger Schiffbau-Gesellschaft, Flensburg, Germany
- Launched: 20 September 1900, as SS Kiel
- Acquired: by seizure, April 1917
- Commissioned: 15 August 1917
- Decommissioned: 3 May 1918
- Recommissioned: 21 February 1919
- Decommissioned: 26 May 1931
- Recommissioned: 17 September 1940
- Decommissioned: 23 October 1946
- Reclassified: ID-3143, 15 August 1917; AS-6, 17 July 1920; IX-42, 17 September 1940
- Fate: Sold, 23 October 1946

General characteristics
- Type: Cargo ship / submarine tender / barracks ship
- Displacement: 6,075 long tons (6,172 t)
- Length: 403 ft 6 in (122.99 m)
- Beam: 47 ft 6 in (14.48 m)
- Draft: 24 ft 9 in (7.54 m)
- Speed: 12 kn (14 mph; 22 km/h)
- Complement: 345
- Armament: 4 × 4 in (100 mm)/50 cal guns, 2 × 3 in (76 mm)/50 cal dual purpose guns

USS Camden (AS-6) was the first ship of the United States Navy to bear the name Camden, after Camden, New Jersey the city that lies on the Delaware River across from Philadelphia, Pennsylvania.

Initially a German cargo ship known as Kiel, the vessel was seized during World War I and entered into service with the US Navy in 1917 after having her name changed to Camden. She later saw service as a submarine tender and a barracks ship before her sale in 1946.

== United States service history ==
=== Cargo ship, 1917-1918 ===
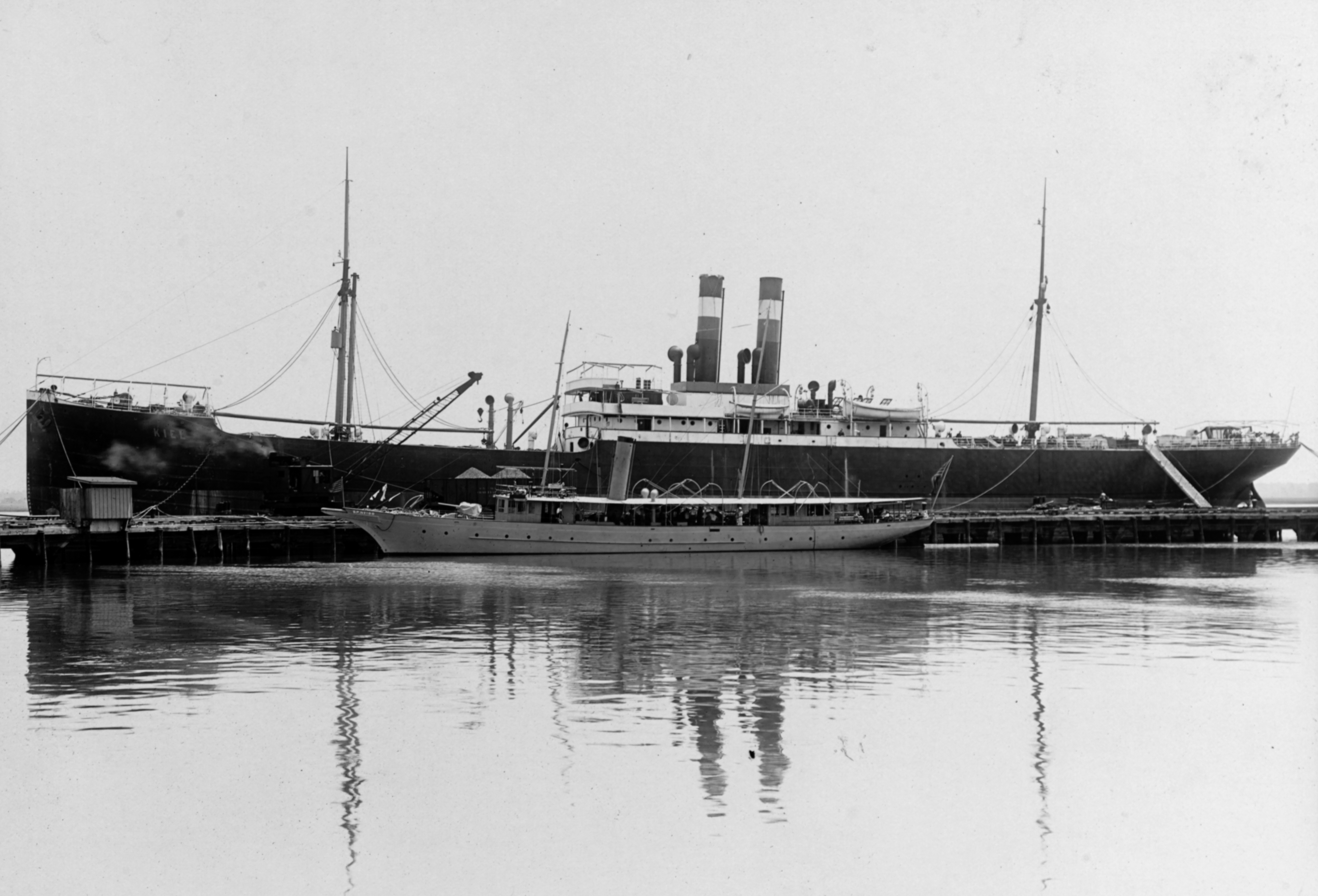
Camden undergoing conversion into a cargo ship at Charleston Navy Yard, Charleston, South Carolina, on 11 June 1917. The patrol vessel Reposo II is in the foreground.

The ship was built in 1900 by Flensburger Schiffbau-Gesellschaft, Flensburg, Germany, as SS Kiel. The vessel was seized by the United States after its entry into World War I in April 1917; transferred from the Shipping Board on 22 May 1917; fitted out as a cargo ship and commissioned on 15 August 1917 as USS Camden with the identification number ID-3143.

Clearing New York in September 1917, Camden carried coal between Cardiff, Wales, and French ports, with one voyage to the United States, until 25 April 1918, when she again sailed for the U.S. She was decommissioned at Philadelphia Navy Yard on 3 May for conversion into a submarine tender.

=== Submarine tender, 1919-1931 ===
Camden began her many years of service with submarines on 21 February 1919, when she was re-commissioned as a submarine tender with the identification number AS-6. Based out of New London, Connecticut, she was flagship for Commander, Submarine Flotilla, Atlantic Fleet, and Commander, Submarine Division 9 (SubDiv 9) until 15 September 1920. After repairs at Norfolk, Virginia, she followed her division to the Pacific, where she took up tender duties based on San Pedro, Los Angeles on 24 June 1921. She briefly served as flagship of Commander, Submarine Flotilla, Pacific Fleet early in 1922, and in March 1923 returned to the Atlantic for duty. As flagship of SubDiv 4 at New London, and later as flagship of Commander, Control Force, she led in large-scale maneuvers and exercises. Highlights of this period included her participation in determined efforts to raise the submarine S-5 in September–October 1925, and her presence at the presidential Naval Review in Hampton Roads in May 1927. Camden was decommissioned at Philadelphia on 26 May 1931.

=== Barracks ship, 1940-1946 ===
War called the veteran back from retirement, and on 17 September 1940 Camden was reclassified IX-42, and assigned to New York Navy Yard as a barracks ship. Towed by tug USS Allegheny (AT-19), the floating barracks arrived at Pier 92, New York City on 18 September, and performed her humble but essential role of berthing the war-swollen complement of the yard until 23 October 1946, when she was sold.

== Awards ==
- World War I Victory Medal with "TRANSPORT" clasp
- American Defense Service Medal
- American Campaign Medal
- World War II Victory Medal
