= Sanda =

== Places ==
- Sanda, Lahore, a neighbourhood in Punjab, Pakistan
- Sanda, Gotland, a village in the island of Gotland; see Mästerby
- Sanda, Hyōgo, Japan
- Sanda University, Shanghai, China
- Various islands in Scotland:
  - Sanda Island (Sandaigh), off Kintyre
  - Handa Island (Eilean Shannda), off Sutherland
  - Sanday, Inner Hebrides (Sandaigh), in the Small Isles
  - Sanday, Orkney
  - Sandray (Sanndraigh), in the Outer Hebrides

== People ==
=== Surname ===
- Sanda (surname)

=== Given name ===
- Sanda Ladoși, Romanian singer
- Sanda Mamić, Croatian tennis player
- Sanda Min Hla, 14th-century Burmese queen
- Sanda Oumarou, Cameroonian footballer
- Sanda Bouba Oumarou, Central African Republic basketball player
- Sanda Stolojan, Romanian poet, translator, and writer
- Sanda Toma (canoeist), Romanian Olympic sprint canoeist
- Sanda Toma (rower), Romanian Olympic rower
- Umaru Sanda Ndayako, traditional ruler, Nigeria

== Other ==
- USS Sanda (1917), a United States Navy patrol boat in commission from 1917 to 1920
- Sanda (sport), a Chinese full-contact combat sport
- Sandas, a Hittite lion god
- Sanda, the Brown Gargantua, featured in War of the Gargantuas (1966)
- Sanda (manga), a 2021 manga series written and illustrated by Paru Itagaki
- Indian spiny-tailed lizard or sanda in Indic languages, a species of lizard renowned as a source of aphrodisiac
