= USS Herreshoff =

USS Herreshoff may refer to various United States Navy ships:

- USS Herreshoff No. 306 (SP-1841), a patrol boat in commission from 1918 to 1922
- USS Herreshoff No. 308 (SP-2232), a patrol boat in commission from 1918 to 1923
- USS Herreshoff No. 309 (SP-1218), a patrol boat in commission from 1917 to 1918
- USS Herreshoff No. 321 (SP-2235), a patrol boat commissioned in 1918 and lost in 1921
- USS Herreshoff No. 322 (SP-2373), a patrol boat in commission from 1918 to 1919
- USS Herreshoff No. 323 (SP-2840), a patrol boat in commission from 1918 to 1927
