= List of listed buildings in Small Isles, Highland =

This is a list of listed buildings in the parish of Small Isles in the Highland council area of Scotland. This includes the islands of Canna, Eigg, Muck, Rùm and Sanday, as well as several smaller islands around these.

== List ==
| Name | Location | Date listed | Geo-coordinates | Notes | Category | LB number | Image |
|---|---|---|---|---|---|---|---|
| Howlin | Isle of Eigg | | 56°55′42″N 6°08′41″W | | B | 44969 | Upload Photo |
| Clanranald Harbour | Isle of Eigg | | 56°52′49″N 6°07′59″W | | C(S) | 14110 | Upload another image |
| Garden Gazebo, Kinloch Castle | Isle of Rùm | | 57°00′50″N 6°16′47″W | | B | 14126 | Upload another image |
| Roman Catholic Church and Presbytery, Cleadale | Isle of Eigg | | 56°55′09″N 6°09′07″W | | C(S) | 44968 | Upload another image |
| Kildonnan Barn | Isle of Eigg | | 56°53′20″N 6°07′20″W | | C(S) | 14114 | Upload Photo |
| Bullough Mausoleum, Harris | Isle of Rùm | | 56°58′30″N 6°23′07″W | | B | 14122 | Upload another image See more images |
| Canna House | Isle of Canna | | 57°03′35″N 6°29′50″W | | B | 14128 | Upload Photo |
| Croft House, Cleadale | Isle of Eigg | | 56°55′18″N 6°08′44″W | | C(S) | 44970 | Upload Photo |
| Kildonnan Farmhouse | Isle of Eigg | | 56°53′19″N 6°07′21″W | | C(S) | 14113 | Upload Photo |
| Old Manse and Walled Garden (Former Church of Scotland Manse) | Isle of Eigg | | 56°53′22″N 6°08′06″W | | B | 14116 | Upload another image |
| Cottage 1/2 Mile West Of Gallanach Farm (Only Building) | Isle of Muck | | 56°50′21″N 6°15′48″W | | B | 14120 | Upload another image |
| Kiln by Pier | Isle of Rùm | | 57°00′37″N 6°16′28″W | | C(S) | 14123 | Upload another image |
| Former Mill, Kildonan | Isle of Eigg | | 56°53′24″N 6°07′34″W | | B | 14117 | Upload another image |
| Bridge over the Slugan Burn, Kinloch Castle | Isle of Rùm | | 57°00′46″N 6°16′51″W | | B | 14127 | Upload another image |
| Church of Scotland and Burial Ground | Isle of Canna | | 57°03′31″N 6°29′37″W | | B | 14131 | Upload another image See more images |
| Eigg Lodge | Isle of Eigg | | 56°52′50″N 6°08′23″W | | B | 14111 | Upload another image See more images |
| St Edward's Roman Catholic Church | Isle of Sanday | | 57°03′12″N 6°29′41″W | | B | 14132 | Upload another image See more images |
| St. Donnan's Church And Burial Ground | Isle of Eigg | | 56°53′29″N 6°07′31″W | | B | 14118 | Upload another image |
| Bayview | Isle of Rùm | | 57°00′33″N 6°16′14″W | | B | 14121 | Upload Photo |
| Old Pier | Isle of Rùm | | 57°00′38″N 6°16′23″W | | C(S) | 14124 | Upload another image See more images |
| Kinloch Castle | Isle of Rùm | | 57°00′49″N 6°16′55″W | | A | 14125 | Upload another image See more images |
| Coroghon Barn | Isle of Canna | | 57°03′37″N 6°29′26″W | | B | 14130 | Upload Photo |
| Church of Scotland and Burial Ground | Isle of Eigg | | 56°53′32″N 6°08′16″W | | C(S) | 14133 | Upload another image |
| Shepherd's Bothy, Grulin | Isle of Eigg | | 56°52′46″N 6°10′38″W | | B | 14112 | Upload another image See more images |
| Laig Farmhouse | Isle of Eigg | | 56°54′40″N 6°09′46″W | | B | 14115 | Upload another image |
| Schoolhouse and School | Isle of Eigg | | 56°53′58″N 6°08′23″W | | C(S) | 14119 | Upload another image |
| Change House and Steading/Barn | Isle of Canna | | 57°03′28″N 6°30′01″W | | C(S) | 14129 | Upload Photo |

== Key ==
The scheme for classifying buildings in Scotland is:

- Category A: "buildings of national or international importance, either architectural or historic; or fine, little-altered examples of some particular period, style or building type."
- Category B: "buildings of regional or more than local importance; or major examples of some particular period, style or building type, which may have been altered."
- Category C: "buildings of local importance; lesser examples of any period, style, or building type, as originally constructed or moderately altered; and simple traditional buildings which group well with other listed buildings."

In March 2016 there were 47,288 listed buildings in Scotland. Of these, 8% were Category A, and 50% were Category B, with the remaining 42% being Category C.

== See also ==
- List of listed buildings in Highland
