= Arafat Djako =

Togolese footballer

Personal information
- Date of birth: 10 November 1988 (age 38)
- Place of birth: Lomé, Togo
- Height: 1.77 m (5 ft 10 in)
- Position: Forward

Youth career
- –2006: Merlan

Senior career*
| Years | Team | Apps | (Gls) |
| 2007–2008 | Merlan | 26 | (4) |
| 2008–2009 | Ashanti Gold | 8 | (3) |
| 2009–2010 | Bnei Sakhnin | 27 | (3) |
| 2010 | Hapoel Acre | 16 | (10) |
| 2011–2012 | Anzhi Makhachkala | 1 | (0) |
| 2011 | → Gaziantepspor (loan) | 4 | (0) |
| 2012 | → Al-Arabi (loan) | 7 | (0) |
| 2012 | Inter Baku | 4 | (1) |
| 2013 | Bnei Sakhnin | 9 | (0) |
| 2014 | Dacia Chișinău | 4 | (1) |
| 2015–2016 | CF Mounana | | |
| 2016–2017 | Awassa City | | |
| 2018 | Wolaitta Dicha | | |
| 2018–2019 | Bahir Dar Kenema | | |
| 2019–2020 | Wolkite City | | |
| 2020 | Sebeta City | | |

International career
| 2008–2012 | Togo | 2 | (0) |
- * Club domestic league appearances and goals

Arafat Djako (born 10 November 1988) is a Togolese former professional footballer who played as a forward.

== Club career ==
Djako began his career in the youth from AC Merlan, was in Winter 2007 promoted to the first team, here played between 1 July 2008 than joined to Ghanaian top club Ashanti Gold S.C., In 2009, he joined the Israeli club of Bnei Sakhnin at the end of that season he sold to another Israeli club Hapoel Acre.

On 8 September 2012, it was announced that Djako had joined Inter Baku on a free transfer.

On 19 March 2014, Djako signed for Dacia Chișinău on a two-year contract after a short trial period.

== International career ==
Djako played his debut for the Togo national team on 10 September 2008 against Zambia and his second call up was on 28 March 2009 for the game against Cameroon in the Qualification for the 2010 FIFA World Cup.
