= William Frame =

English architect

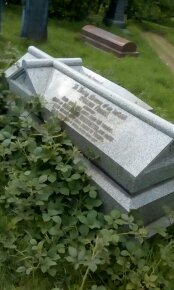
- Grave of Frame, Cathays Cemetery
- Born: 1848; Melksham, Wiltshire, England
- Died: 11 April 1906 (aged 58–59)
- Notable work: Cardiff Castle; Castell Coch; Pierhead Building

William Frame was an English architect.

== Life and works ==
Frame was born at Melksham, Wiltshire in 1848. Training as an architect, he was articled firstly to William Smith of Trowbridge, he then became assistant to John Prichard of Llandaff. In 1868, he entered the office of William Burges and worked with Burges at Cardiff Castle and Castell Coch. Following Burges's death in 1881, Frame remained in the service of John Crichton-Stuart, 3rd Marquess of Bute and continued Burges's work at both castles, as well as designing the Grade I listed Pierhead Building in the docks built by Bute's father.

Frame also worked on Bute's Scottish home, Mount Stuart House, on the Isle of Bute, and his home in Falkland, Fife, the House of Falkland. He undertook the building of the Animal Wall, in the grounds of Cardiff Castle, for which Burges had got no further than drawing the designs. Burges's favourite sculptor, Thomas Nicholls, executed the carvings. During these years he won the Royal Academy's gold medal and the Soane Medallion. Later in his life, Frame also produced a small number of very well regarded grandfather clocks in the village of Larkhall, Scotland.

Frame's latter years were marred by alcoholism. His drinking had been problematic for some time; in 1890, Bute noted in his diary, "Frame … drunk again … had to dismiss him". He died in April 1906 and was buried on the 21st of that month in Cathays Cemetery in Cardiff.

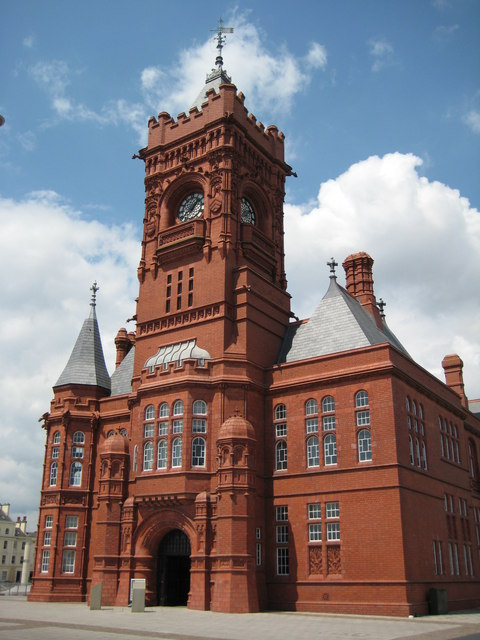
Pierhead Building, Cardiff Bay, Frame's masterpiece

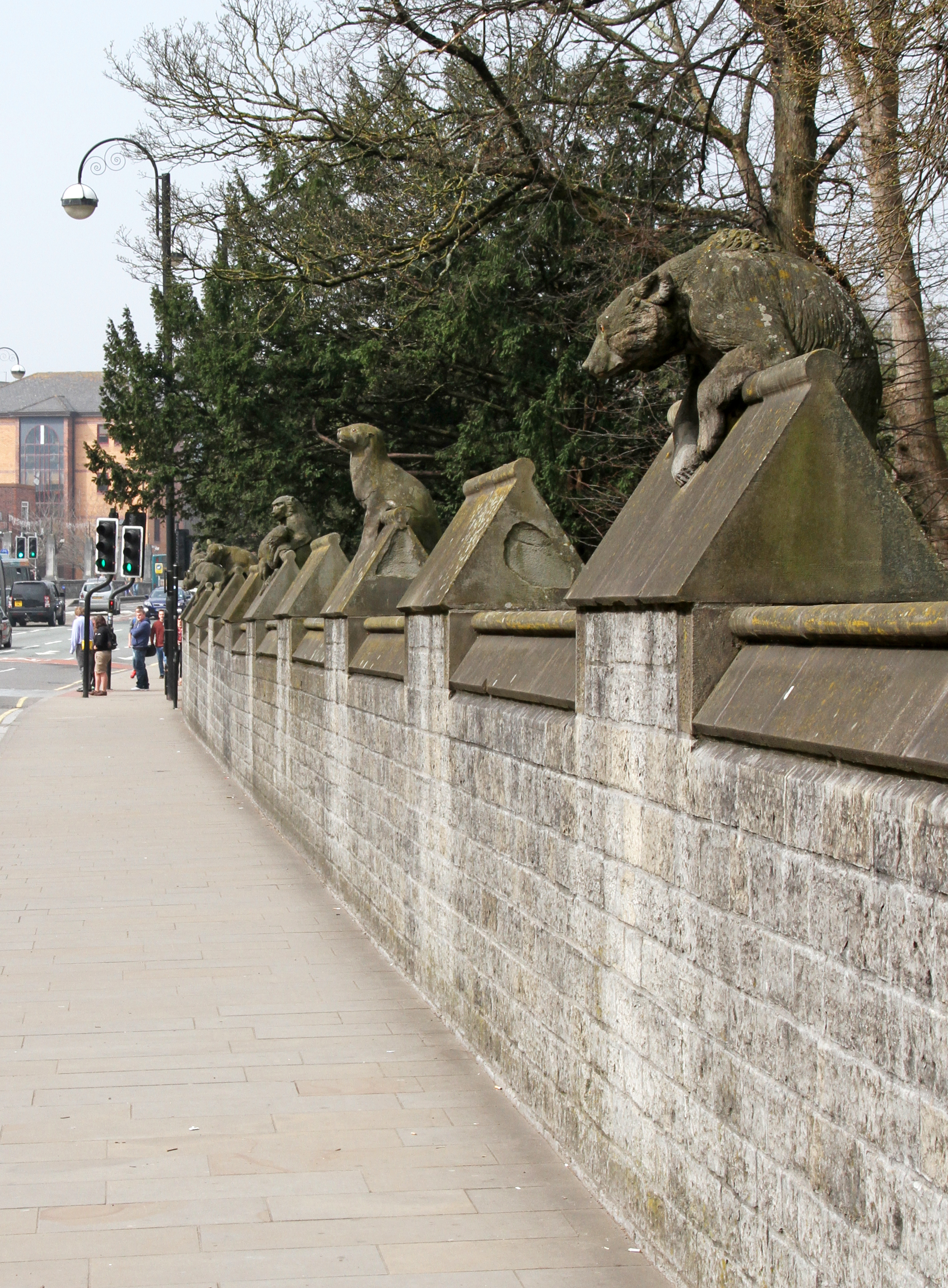
Animal Wall

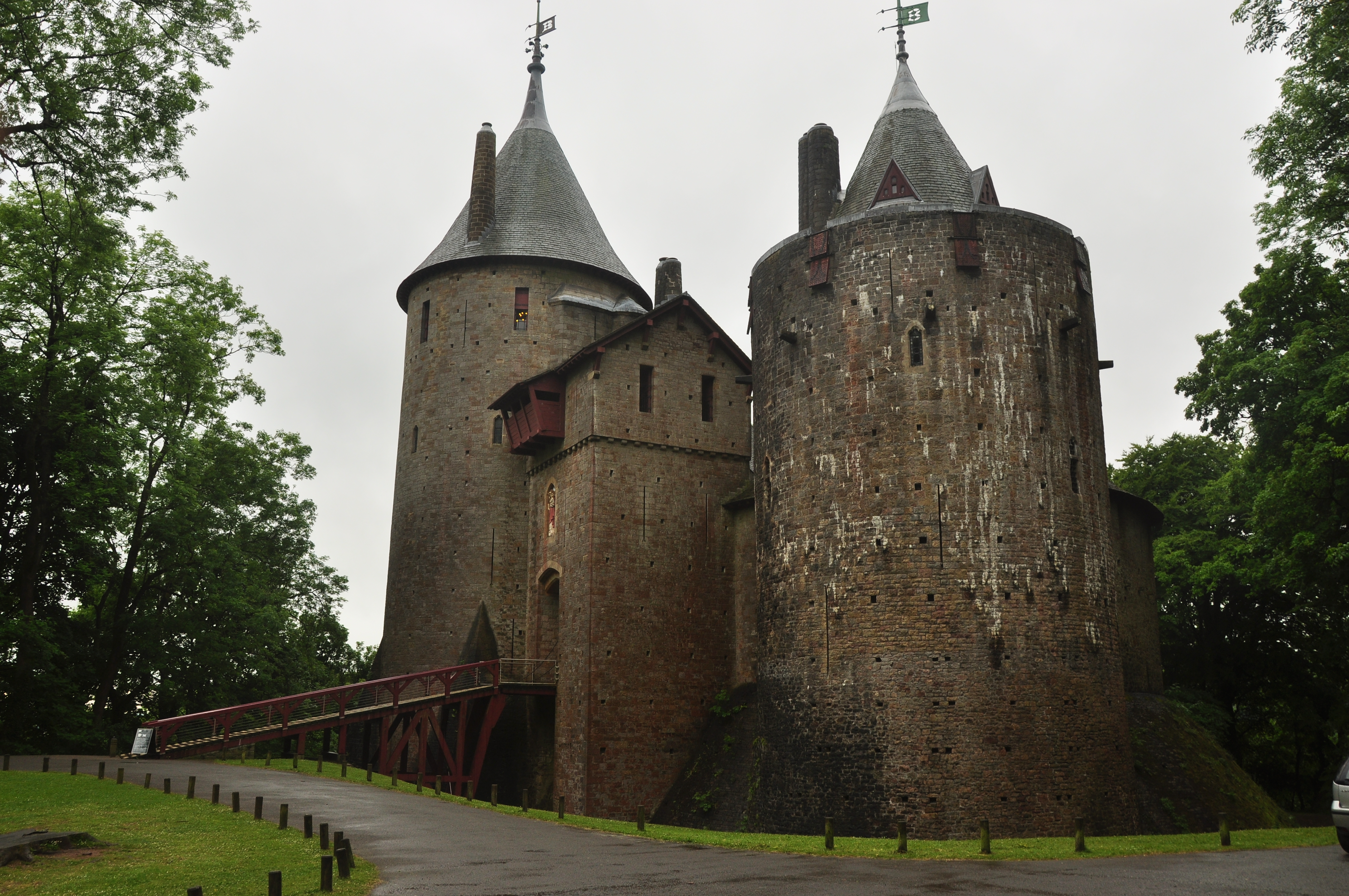
Castell Coch

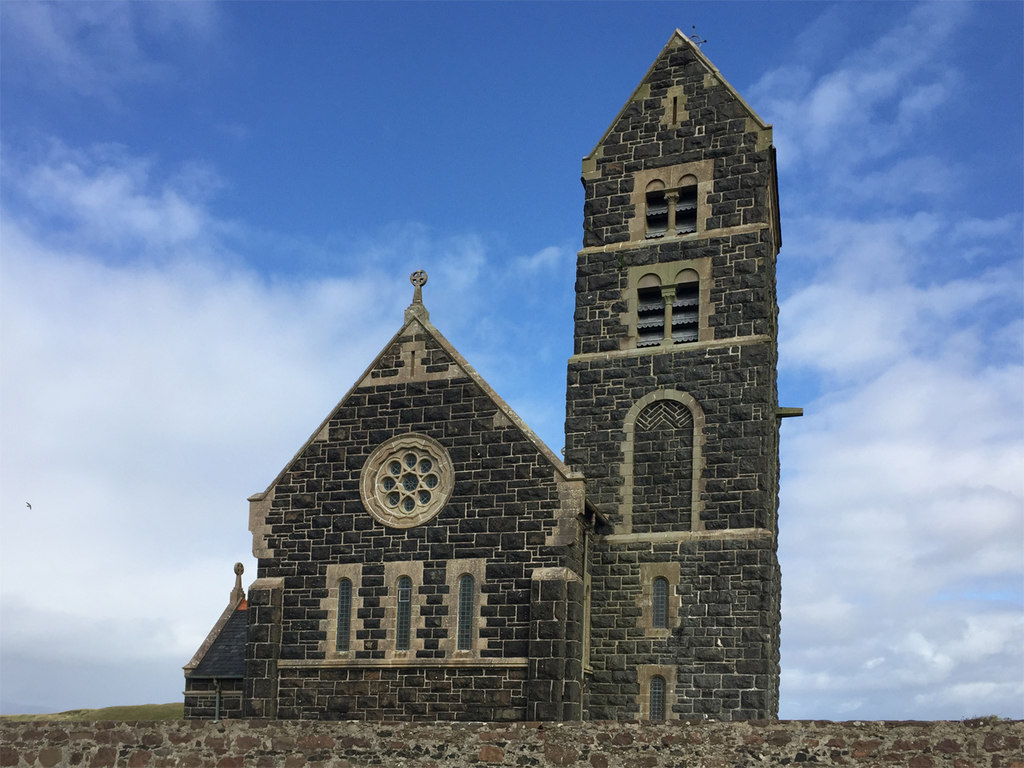
St Edward's Church, Sanday

== Sources ==
- Crook, J. Mordaunt (2013). William Burges and the High Victorian Dream. London, UK: Frances Lincoln. ISBN 978-0-7112-3349-2.
- Hannah, Rosemary (2012). The Grand Designer: Third Marquess of Bute. Birlinn. ISBN 9781780270272.
- Williams, Matthew (2016). The Animal Wall at Cardiff Castle. Cardiff, Wales: City of Cardiff Council. OCLC 1062307948.
