= Stolojan =

Stolojan is a Romanian surname. Notable people with the surname include:

- Anastase Stolojan (1836–1901), Romanian politician
- Sanda Stolojan (1919–2005), Romanian poet and author
- Theodor Stolojan (born 1943), Romanian politician and economist
  - Stolojan I Cabinet, the Cabinet of the Government of Romania (1991, 1992)
