= St Edward's Church, Sanday =

Church in Scotland

St Edward's, Sanday
- St Edward's Centre
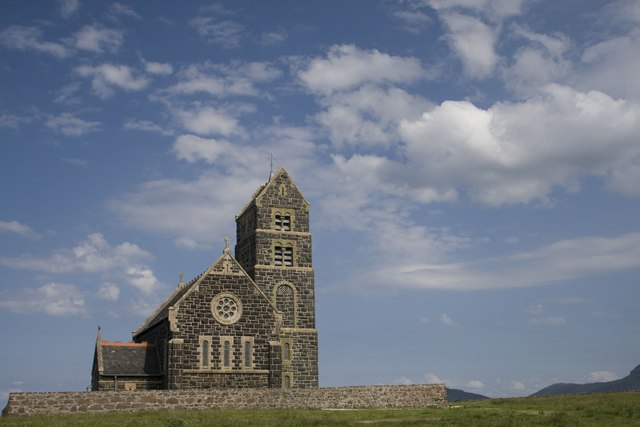
- The building in 2013
- St Edward's, Sanday
- 57°03′12″N 6°29′41″W
- Denomination: Roman Catholic

History
- Status: Deconsecrated

Architecture
- Functional status: Disused
- Heritage designation: B
- Designated: 29 May 1985
- Architect: William Frame
- Style: Neo Romanesque
- Groundbreaking: 1886
- Completed: 1890
- Closed: 1963

Specifications
- Materials: stone

Administration
- Diocese: Argyll & the Isles

St Edward's Church, Sanday, is a deconsecrated, and now disused church on the small isle of Sanday, Inner Hebrides, Scotland.

The church was a gift to the people of Canna and Sanday from Gwendolyn Fitzalan-Howard, the 3rd Marchioness of Bute, who had it erected as a memorial to her father, Edward Fitzalan-Howard, 1st Baron Howard of Glossop, who had died in 1883. At the time, the islands were owned by the Thom family, though permission was willingly given by them, despite the fact that they were not Catholics, and would later build the Protestant St Columba's Church on Canna in 1912. Designed by William Frame, who was architect to the Butes, St Edward's was built between 1886 and 1890. The corbel course in the nave was supplied by Thomas Nicholls. Both of these men would later work on now-famous buildings in Cardiff, where the Marquess owned Cardiff Castle; the most prominent examples being the Pierhead Building, Castell Coch and the Animal Wall. At the time, the islands already had a Catholic chapel, dedicated to St Columba, which had been built on Canna in c. 1770. After St Edward's was built, the old church was converted into a shop and post office.

The populations of Sanday and Canna declined during the 20th Century, with their combined inhabitants now numbering around 30. In the face of this loss of parishioners, the church began to suffer from structural deterioration and closed in 1963. Services have now been moved back into the old St Columba's chapel on Canna (a replacement post office was built nearby). The former church received Listed status in 1985.

After closure, the church was used as a hostelry, and in 2001, was converted into a Gaelic study centre at the cost of £860,000. This was not a successful venture, as it was reported in 2010 that the centre had never been used, and was once again suffering from water damage. By 2016, it was once again disused.

== Gallery ==
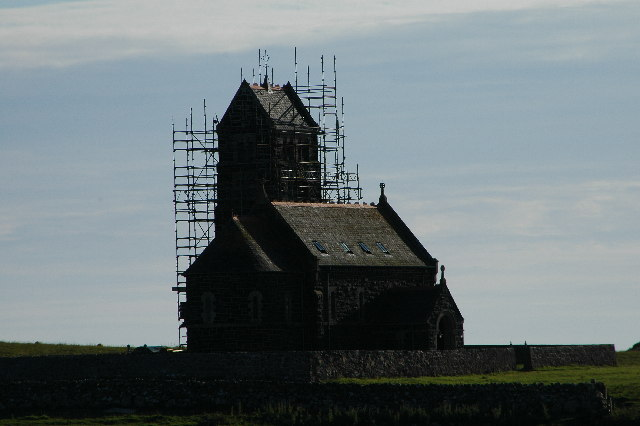
The church under repair in 2005

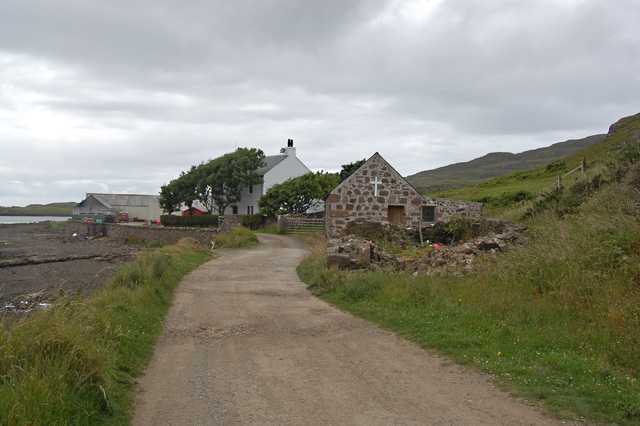
The c.1770 Catholic chapel of St Columba. A post office whilst St Edwards operated. Now once again a church

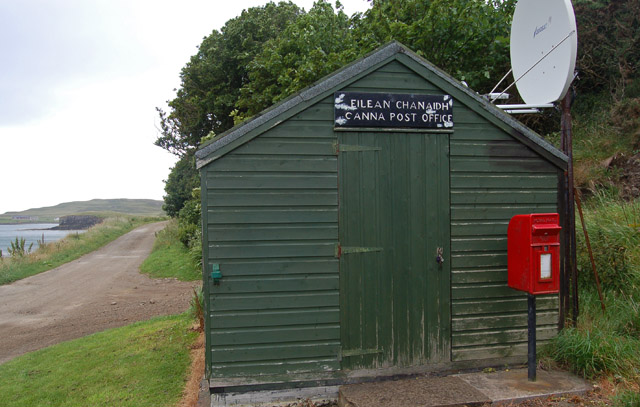
The new post office opened when the chapel reverted to its former purpose

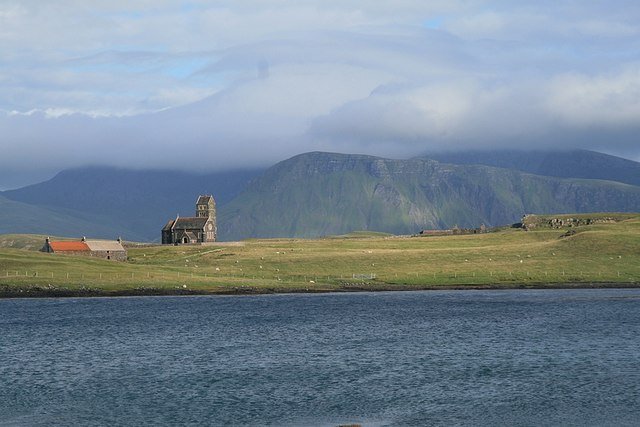

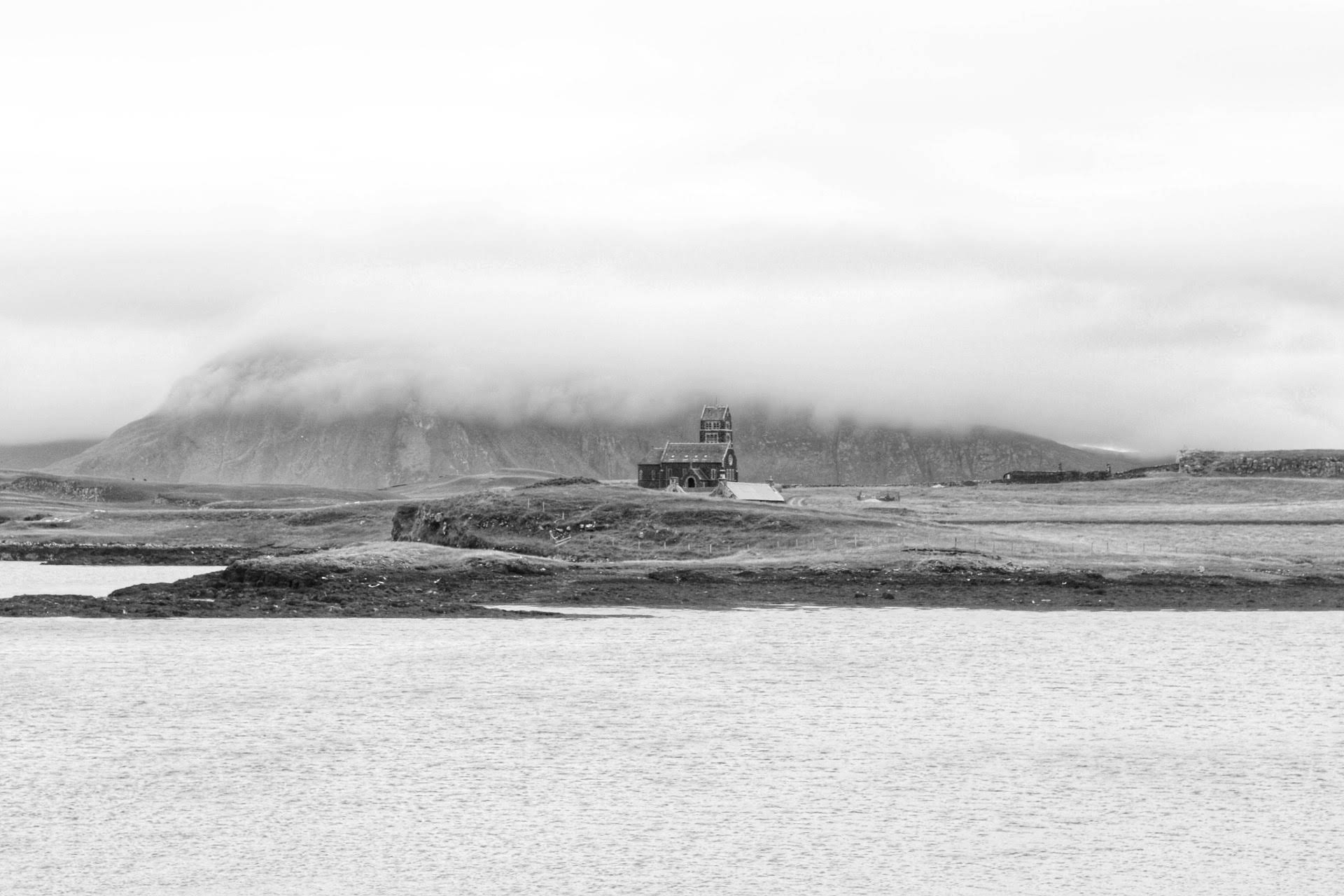
A view of the church taken from Canna with Rum in the background
