= Sanda (surname) =

Sanda or Šanda or Sandå is a surname, and may refer to:

- Alsan Sanda (born 1992), Indonesian footballer
- Anthony Ichiro Sanda (born 1944), Japanese-American particle physicist
- Azumah Namoro Sanda (born 1956), Ghanaian educationist and politician
- Bah Oumarou Sanda (1940–2026), Cameroonian diplomat
- Dominique Sanda (born 1951), French actress
- Joseph Sanda (1985–2020), Cameroonian cyclist
- Joachim Kayi Sanda (born 2006), French footballer
- Makoto Sanda, Japanese author of Rental Magica
- Michal Šanda (born 1965), Czech writer and poet
- Mohammed Sanda (born 1965), Nigerian politician
- Naoki Sanda (born 1992), Japanese footballer
- Pär Olof Sandå (born 1965), Swedish entrepreneur
- Rukky Sanda (born 1984), Nigerian actress
- Tinuade Sanda (born 1979), Nigerian business leader
- Wiyao Sanda-Nabede (born 1986), Togolese footballer
- Yakubu Yackson Sanda (born 1965), Nigerian politician
