= Stade Oscar Anthony =

Stadium in Lomé, Togo

Stade Oscar Anthony is a multi-use stadium in Lomé, Togo. It is currently used mostly for football matches and is the home stadium of Étoile Filante de Lomé and AC Merland. The stadium holds 2,000 people.
