= Wiyao Sanda-Nabede =

Togolese footballer (born 1986)

Personal information
- Full name: Wiyao Ali Pidalnam Sanda-Nabede
- Date of birth: March 9, 1986 (age 40)
- Place of birth: Lomé, Togo
- Height: 1.78 m (5 ft 10 in)
- Position: Left back

Team information
- Current team: AC Merlan
- Number: 2

Youth career
- 1992–2001: AC Merlan
- 2001–2002: Lycée de Dottignies

Senior career*
| Years | Team | Apps | (Gls) |
| 2003– | AC Merlan | 72 | (4) |

International career
| 1998–2000 | Togo U-12 | 10 | (2) |
| 2001–2003 | Togo U-17 | 7 | (1) |
| 2004–2007 | Togo | 1 | (0) |
- * Club domestic league appearances and goals

Wiyao Ali Pidalnam Sanda-Nabede (born March 9, 1986, in Lomé) is a Togolese footballer, who plays for AC Merlan.

== Career ==
Sanda-Nabede began his career in the youth from AC Merlan and joined than in summer 2001 for one year to Lycée de Dottignies in Belgium who with the school team, before in Winter 2003 promoted to the first team from AC Merlan.

== International career ==
He was member of the Togo national football team his last call-up was on 25 February 2007.

== Honours ==
- 1994/1996 : Champion in Togo with the U-12 of AC Merlan
- 1998/2000 : Finalist at International Championship in Burkina Faso
- 2000/2001 : Champion du Togo « Juniors »
- 2001/2002 : Togo national football team « Junior »
- 2002 : Champion of the 2 division with AC Merlan
- June 2004 : Call-Up for the Togo national football team
