= USS Herreshoff No. 306 =

Patrol vessel of the United States Navy

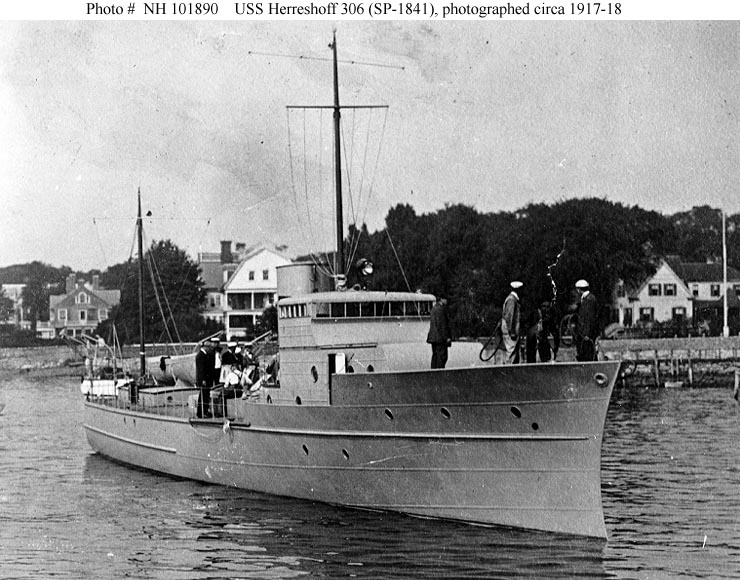
- USS Herreshoff No. 306 (SP-1841) in 1917 or 1918. Everyone on board is in civilian clothes, so this photograph may have been taken before the United States Navy acquired her.

History

United States
- Name: USS Herreshoff No. 306
- Namesake: Previous name retained
- Builder: Herreshoff Manufacturing Company, Bristol, Rhode Island
- Completed: 1917
- Acquired: 14 February 1918
- Commissioned: 27 February 1918
- Fate: Sold 1 December 1922
- Notes: Operated as private motorboat Herreshoff No. 306 1917-1918; loaned to United States Army Air Service1920-1921; in private use from December 1922

General characteristics
- Type: Patrol vessel
- Displacement: 60 tons
- Length: 112 ft 5 in (34.26 m)
- Beam: 15 ft 2 in (4.62 m)
- Draft: 4 ft (1.2 m)
- Speed: 24 knots
- Armament: 1 × 6-pounder gun

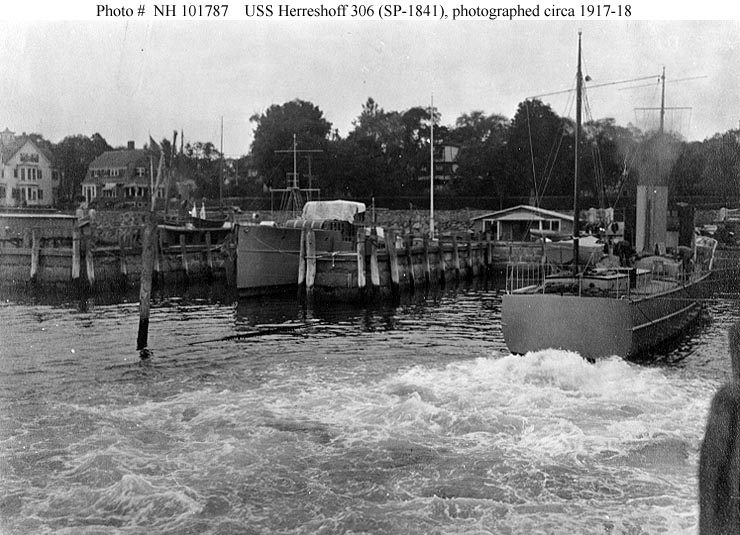
USS Herreshoff No. 309 (SP-1841) (right) in port sometime in 1917 or 1918. This photograph may have been taken before the United States Navy acquired her.

USS Herreshoff No. 306 (SP-1841), also written Herreshoff #306, was a United States Navy patrol vessel in commission from 1918 to 1922.

== Construction, acquisition, and commissioning ==
At the urging of Assistant Secretary of the Navy (and future President of the United States) Franklin D. Roosevelt (1882–1945), the industrialist, financier, and philanthropist Alfred I. DuPont (1864–1935) of Wilmington, Delaware, contracted with the Herreshoff Manufacturing Company at Bristol, Rhode Island, for one of a small group of 60-ton steel-hulled boats built to a naval patrol boat design for private owners with the intention that they would be made available to the U.S. Navy in time of war. Du Pont's boat, with the builder's name Herreshoff No. 306, was completed in 1917.

On 14 February 1918, the U.S. Navy purchased Herreshoff No. 306 from du Pont for use as a section patrol boat during World War I. She was commissioned at Newport, Rhode Island, as USS Herreshoff No. 306 (SP-1841) on 27 February 1918.

== Operational history ==
Herreshoff No. 306 proceeded to New London, Connecticut, in company with two other Herreshoff-built boats to be fitted with listening gear. She departed New London on 5 May 1918 in company with the patrol boats USS Herreshoff No. 308 (SP-2232) and USS Herreshoff No. 321 (SP-2235) bound for the Panama Canal Zone, stopping at Charleston, South Carolina; Key West, Florida; and Guantanamo Bay, Cuba, en route. She arrived at Cristóbal in the Canal Zone on 1 June 1918 and assumed duty as harbor patrol vessel there. She continued to perform this duty until the end of World War I on 11 November 1918, after which she served the 15th Naval District as a patrol craft.

Herreshoff No. 306 was loaned to the United States Department of War on 2 October 1920 for use by the United States Army Air Service in the Canal Zone. She was returned to the Navy in March 1921.

== Disposal ==
Herreshoff No. 306 was taken to Philadelphia, Pennsylvania, and placed on sale, finally being sold to W. A. D. Smith of New York City on 1 December 1922.
