= USS Herreshoff No. 308 =

Patrol vessel of the United States Navy

History

United States
- Name: USS Herreshoff No. 308
- Namesake: Previous name retained
- Builder: Herreshoff Manufacturing Company, Bristol, Rhode Island
- Completed: 1917
- Acquired: 21 February 1918
- Commissioned: 23 February 1918
- Stricken: 12 September 1923
- Fate: Sold 27 May 1924
- Notes: Operated as private motorboat Herreshoff No. 308 1917-1918; loaned to U.S. Department of War 1920-1923; in private use from May 1924

General characteristics
- Type: Patrol vessel
- Tonnage: 60 Gross register tons
- Displacement: 60 tons
- Length: 112 ft 5 in (34.26 m)
- Beam: 15 ft 2 in (4.62 m)
- Draft: 4 ft (1.2 m)
- Propulsion: Steam engine
- Speed: 24 knots
- Armament: 1 × 6-pounder gun

USS Herreshoff No. 308 (SP-2232), also written Herreshoff #308, was a United States Navy patrol vessel in commission from 1918 to 1923.

== Construction, acquisition, and commissioning ==
At the suggestion of Assistant Secretary of the Navy (and future President of the United States) Franklin D. Roosevelt (1882–1945), R. E. Tod of New York City, seeking a way to contribute to the U.S. war effort during World War I, contracted with the Herreshoff Manufacturing Company at Bristol, Rhode Island, for one of a small group of 60-ton steel-hulled steam-powered boats built to a naval patrol boat design for private owners with the intention that they would be made available to the U.S. Navy in time of war. Tod's boat, with the builder's name Herreshoff No. 308, was completed in 1917.

On 21 February 1918, the U.S. Navy acquired Herreshoff No. 308 from Tod for use as a section patrol boat during World War I. She was commissioned at Newport, Rhode Island, as USS Herreshoff No. 308 (SP-2232) on 23 February 1918.

== Operational history ==
After spending a short time at New London, Connecticut, fitting out with listening gear, Herreshoff No. 308 departed New London on 5 May 1918 in company with the patrol boats USS Herreshoff No. 306 (SP-1841) and USS Herreshoff No. 321 (SP-2235) bound for the Panama Canal Zone, stopping at Charleston, South Carolina; Key West, Florida; and Guantanamo Bay, Cuba, en route. She arrived at Cristóbal in the Canal Zone on 1 June 1918. For the next two years she served on patrol duty in the Canal Zone at Cristóbal and Balboa.

Herreshoff No. 308 was loaned to the United States Department of War on 14 October 1920 for use by the Governor of the Panama Canal Zone. The Canal Zone government used her as a patrol craft.

== Disposal ==
Returned to the Navy in September 1923, Herreshoff No. 308 was stricken from the Navy List on 12 September 1923. She was sold to J. A. Kenney of Brooklyn, New York, on 27 May 1924.
