= USS Herreshoff No. 321 =

Patrol vessel of the United States Navy

History

United States
- Name: USS Herreshoff No. 321
- Namesake: Previous name retained
- Builder: Herreshoff Manufacturing Company, Bristol, Rhode Island
- Completed: 1917
- Acquired: 24 March 1918
- Commissioned: 24 March 1918
- Stricken: 8 October 1921
- Fate: Foundered 7 October 1921
- Notes: Operated as private motorboat Herreshoff No. 321 1917–1918

General characteristics
- Type: Patrol vessel
- Tonnage: 60 Gross register tons
- Displacement: 60 tons
- Length: 112 ft 5 in (34.26 m)
- Beam: 15 ft 2 in (4.62 m)
- Draft: 4 ft (1.2 m)
- Propulsion: Steam engine
- Speed: 24 knots
- Armament: 1 × 6-pounder gun

USS Herreshoff No. 321 (SP-2235), also written Herreshoff #321, was a United States Navy patrol vessel in commission from 1918 to 1921.

== Construction, acquisition, and commissioning ==
At the suggestion of Assistant Secretary of the Navy (and future President of the United States) Franklin D. Roosevelt (1882–1945), businessman Payne Whitney (1876–1927) of New York City, seeking a way to contribute to the U.S. war effort during World War I, contracted with the Herreshoff Manufacturing Company at Bristol, Rhode Island, for one of a small group of 60-ton steel-hulled steam-powered boats built to a naval patrol boat design for private owners with the intention that they would be made available to the U.S. Navy in time of war. Whitney's boat, with the builder's name Herreshoff No. 321, was completed in 1917.

On 24 March 1918, the U.S. Navy acquired Herreshoff No. 321 from Whitney for use as a section patrol boat during World War I. She was commissioned at Newport, Rhode Island, as USS Herreshoff No. 321 (SP-2235) the same day.

== Operational history ==
After spending a short time at New London, Connecticut, fitting out with listening gear, Herreshoff No. 321 departed New London on 5 May 1918 in company with the patrol boats USS Herreshoff No. 306 (SP-1841) and USS Herreshoff No. 308 (SP-2232) bound for the Panama Canal Zone, stopping at Charleston, South Carolina; Key West, Florida; and Guantanamo Bay, Cuba, en route. She arrived at Cristóbal in the Canal Zone on 1 June 1918. She was assigned duty as a patrol vessel in Panama Bay and was used in support of aerial patrols off Panama.

Two years later, Herreshoff No. 321 was offered for sale, but the offer was retracted and instead she was designated for duty with Torpedo Station Keyport at Keyport, Washington.

== Loss ==
While the ammunition ship USS Nitro (AE-2) was towing Herreshoff No. 321 to Keyport, the towing hawser connecting the ships parted off Southern California on 7 October 1921. Before Nitro could make her fast again, Herreshoff No. 321 sank.

Herreshoff No. 321 was stricken from the Navy List on 8 October 1921.
