= Animal Wall =

Grade I listed structure in Cardiff, Wales

- Welsh: Wal yr Anifeiliaid
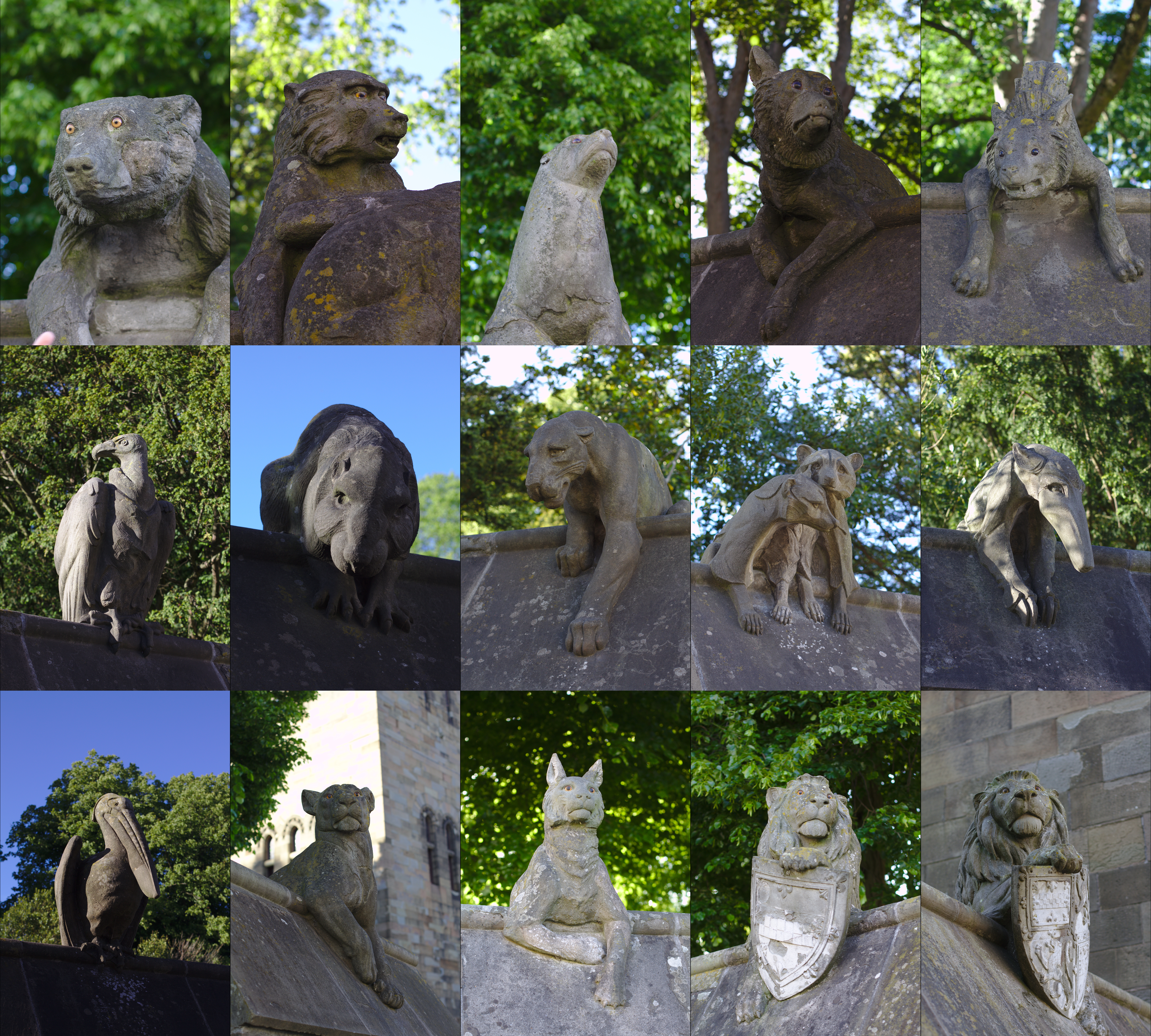

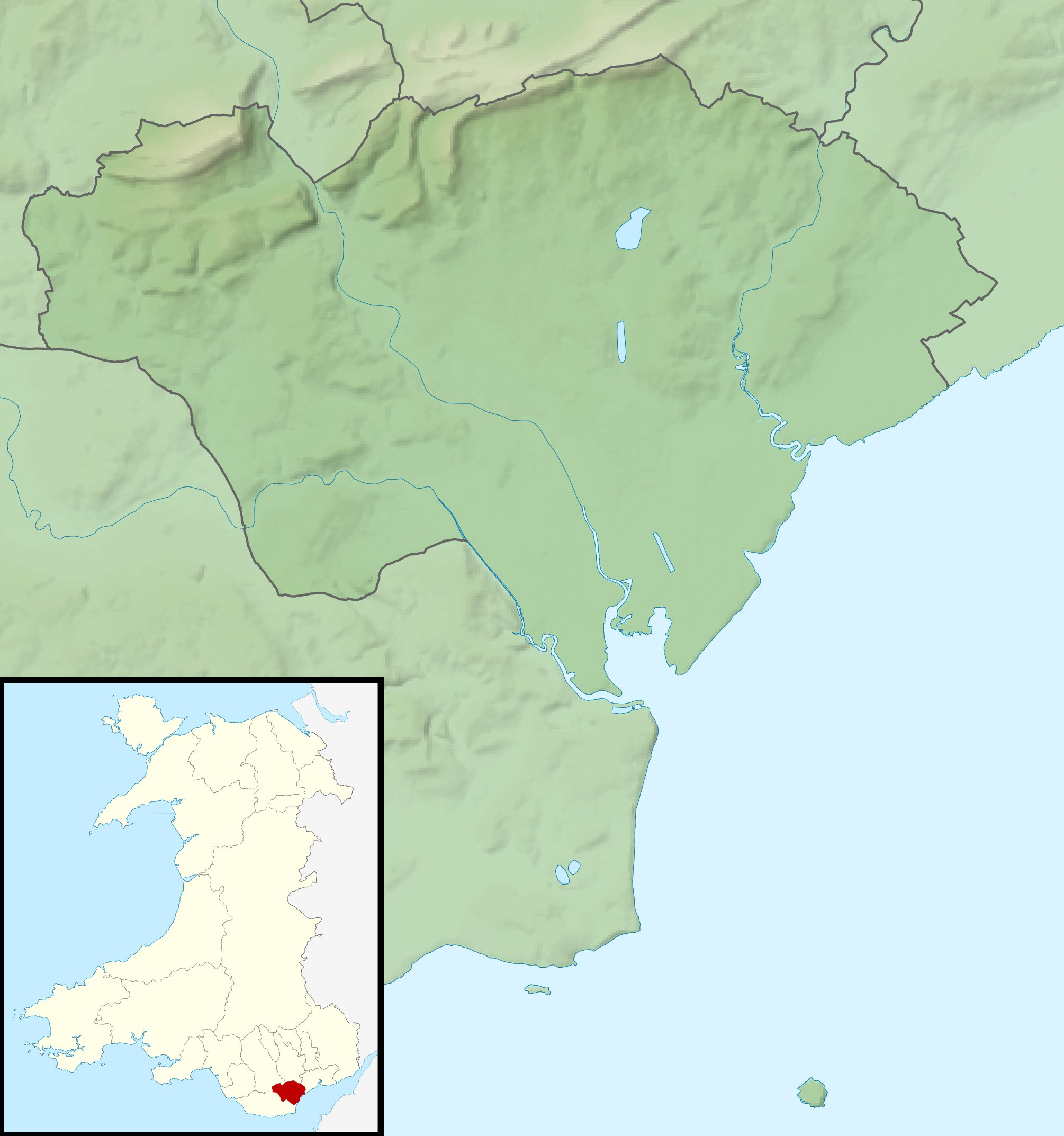
- Location within Cardiff
- 51.481146°N 3.183024°W
- Type: Wall
- Location: Cardiff, Wales

History
- Built: 1880-1930

Site notes
- Architect: William Burges
- Owner: Cardiff City Council

Listed Building – Grade I
- Official name: Animal Wall, and Gates near Clock Tower
- Designated: 2 December 1952; 73 years ago
- Reference no.: 21696

The Animal Wall (Welsh: Wal yr Anifeiliaid) is a sculptured wall depicting 14 animals in the Castle Quarter of the city centre of Cardiff, Wales. It stands to the west of the entrance to Cardiff Castle, having been moved from its original position in front of the castle in the early 1930s. The design for the wall was conceived by William Burges, architect to the third Marquess of Bute, during Burges's reconstruction of the castle in the 1860s, but it was not executed until the late 1880s/early 1890s. This work, which included the original nine animal sculptures, all undertaken by Burges's favourite sculptor, Thomas Nicholls, was carried out under the direction of William Frame, who had previously assisted Burges at both Cardiff Castle and Castell Coch. When the wall was moved in the early 20th century, the fourth Marquess commissioned Alexander Carrick to carve a further six sculptures to sit on the extended wall which now fronted Bute Park. The Animal Wall is a Grade I listed structure.

== History and description ==
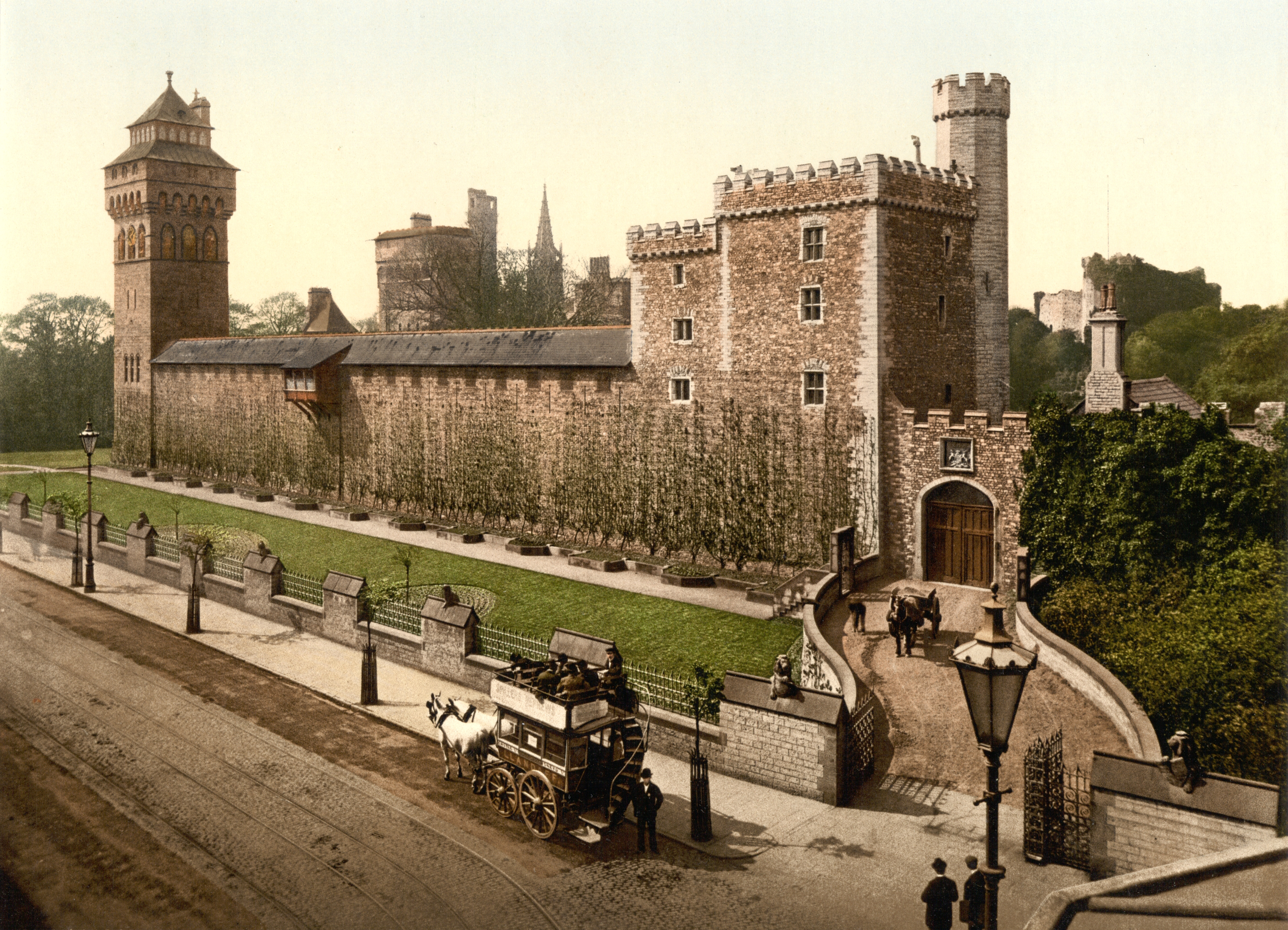
The Animal Wall in front of Cardiff Castle (c. 1890)

John Crichton-Stuart succeeded to the marquessate of Bute in 1848 at the age of six months, on the death of his father. By his 21st birthday, he had converted to Catholicism and come into an inheritance that reputedly made him "the richest man in the world". A significant part of his patrimony included estates in South Wales, brought into the Bute family by his great-grandfather's marriage to Charlotte Windsor, heiress to Herbert Windsor, 2nd Viscount Windsor. The estates centred on Cardiff Castle, a building the marquess despised: "I am painfully alive to the fact that the castle is very far indeed from setting anything like an example in art". In 1865, he met William Burges. This may have resulted from Burges' father's engineering firm, Walker, Burges and Cooper, having undertaken work on the East Bute Docks in Cardiff for the second Marquess. (Note: Pauline Sargent, a member of the South Glamorgan County Architects department and curator of an exhibition of Burges drawings and stained glass cartoons held at Cardiff Castle from July to August 1977, suggests that John (James) McConnochie may have made the introduction. McConnochie was employed by Burges, Walker and Cooper, Burges' father's firm, and subsequently worked for Bute as Chief Engineer at Cardiff Docks.) Bute and Burges established a partnership of patron and architect which lasted until Burges' death in 1881 and saw them transform both Cardiff Castle and the ruins of Castell Coch, another castle north of Cardiff. The architectural writer Michael Hall considers these buildings to be Burges' best, "amongst the most magnificent the Gothic Revival ever achieved".

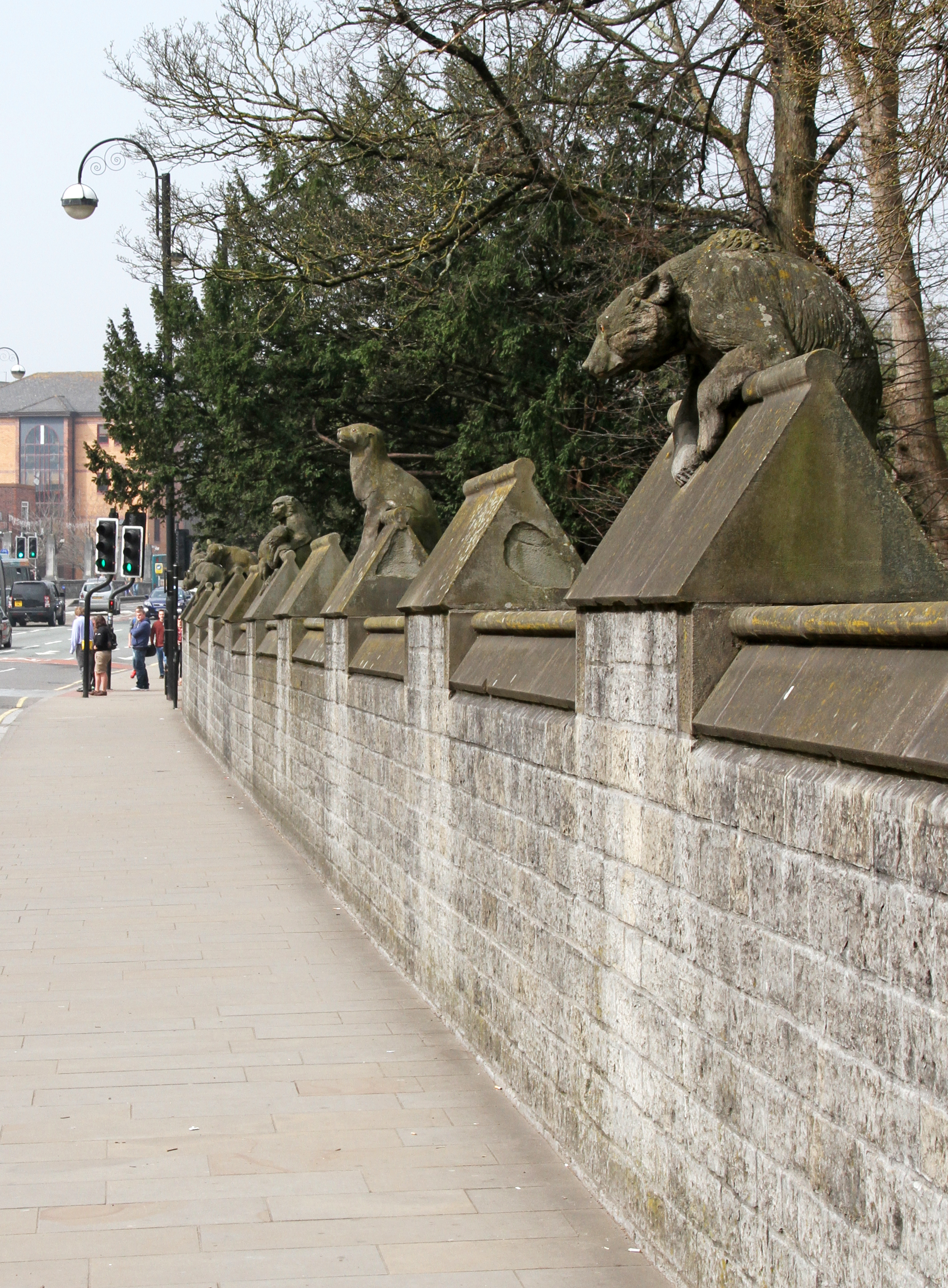
The Animal Wall in 2015

The Animal Wall was designed by Burges in 1866, but it was not built until 1890, after Burges' death in 1881. Burges had originally planned a Pre-Raphaelite garden to be constructed in the moat in front of the castle, and flowerbeds were laid out, those against the castle walls being planted with grape vines. The two lowest storeys of the Clock Tower were to provide accommodation for a gardener and gave access directly into the moat. Joseph Mordaunt Crook, the foremost authority on Burges, considers that the garden, had it been completed, "might have been one of Burges's happiest devices [and] unique: a municipal Pre-Raphaelite garden". The wall on the street side of the garden was complete by 1885, but the carving of the animals was not undertaken until the late 1880s. (Note: John Newman, in his Glamorgan volume of Pevsner's Buildings of Wales, suggests that Burges drew inspiration from the sketchbooks of the medieval mason Villard de Honnecourt.) Work on the castle and the building of the Animal Wall was undertaken by Burges' assistant William Frame. (Note: William Frame's later years were marred by alcoholism. In October 1890, Bute recorded in his diary, "Frame being drunk again, had to dismiss him".) The original nine animal figures were sculptured by Thomas Nicholls, Burges' favourite sculptor, and included a hyena, a wolf, two baboons, a seal, a bear, a lioness, a lynx and two lions. (Note: A plaster cast of one of the sculptures, the beaver, was exhibited at the exhibition held at the National Museum of Wales in 1981, the centenary of Burges' death.)

The wall was moved about 50 metres (160 ft) from outside Cardiff Castle to its present location outside Bute Park in 1922, due to road widening in front of the castle in Duke Street and Castle Street (now the A4161). In 1931 a further six sculptures were added; the pelican, an anteater, two raccoons, a leopard, (Note: In Mordaunt Crook's study of Burges, William Burges and the High Victorian Dream, a photograph of the leopard is incorrectly titled "Sea-lion" and attributed to Nicholls.) a beaver and a vulture. They were sculpted by Alexander Carrick. The animals featured in a 1930s cartoon strip, authored by Dorothy Howard Rowlands, which ran in the South Wales Echo. In the 1970s city council planners planned to demolish the Animal Wall to further widen Castle Street, but the idea was later abandoned.

The animals were originally painted in naturalistic colours, although this paintwork deteriorated rapidly, and was subsequently removed. (Note: The design and construction of the wall led to correspondence in the press. William Frame wrote to the Western Mail on 12 January 1892: "Sir,-Please correct errors that have appeared in The Building News for January 1 and 8, 1892. In your notice of the illustrations of the animals upon the outer walls of Cardiff Castle the late Mr Burges' name is given as architect, and Mr T Nicholls sculptor. The latter name is correct, the former is not. Mr Burges had nothing whatever to do with any portion of this work, which was carried out entirely by yours, etc." Frame was being disingenuous: although he executed the design, the concept was Burges', dating back to a sketch of 1866.) As part of a £5.6 million refurbishment of Bute Park, restoration of the animals began in July 2010. During the repair, the anteater's nose, which has been missing since the late 1990s, was replaced, as well as the missing glass eyes in the nine original animals. This work was completed in October 2010. The Animal Wall is a Grade I listed structure.

== Gallery ==
=== Figures sculptured by Thomas Nicholls in 1891 ===
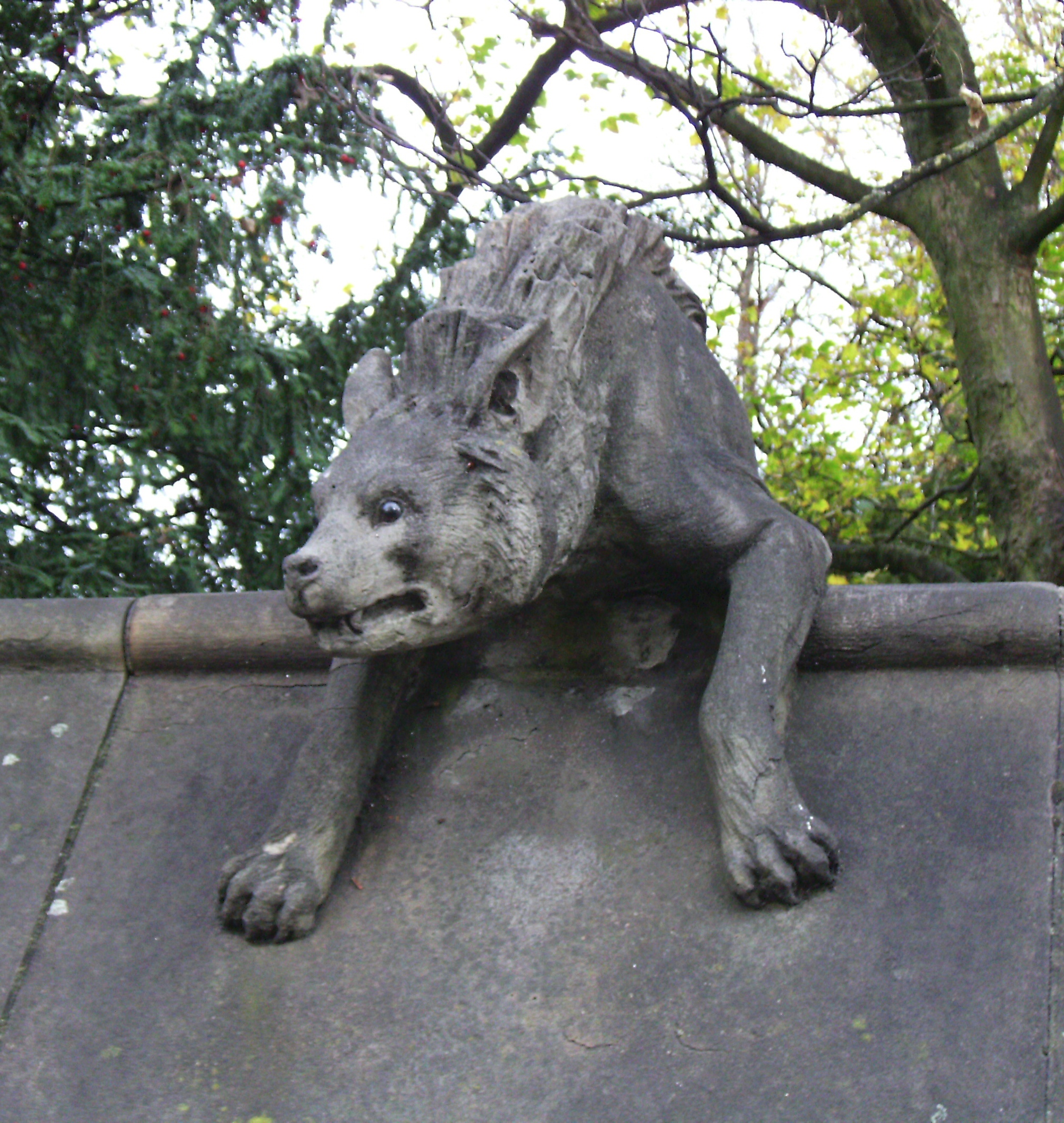
Hyena

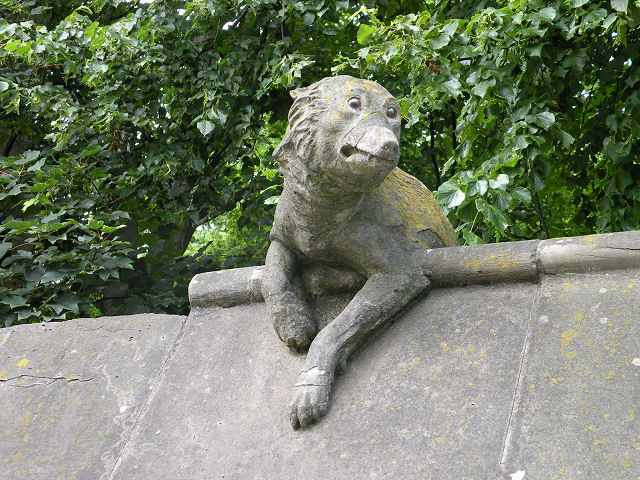
Wolf

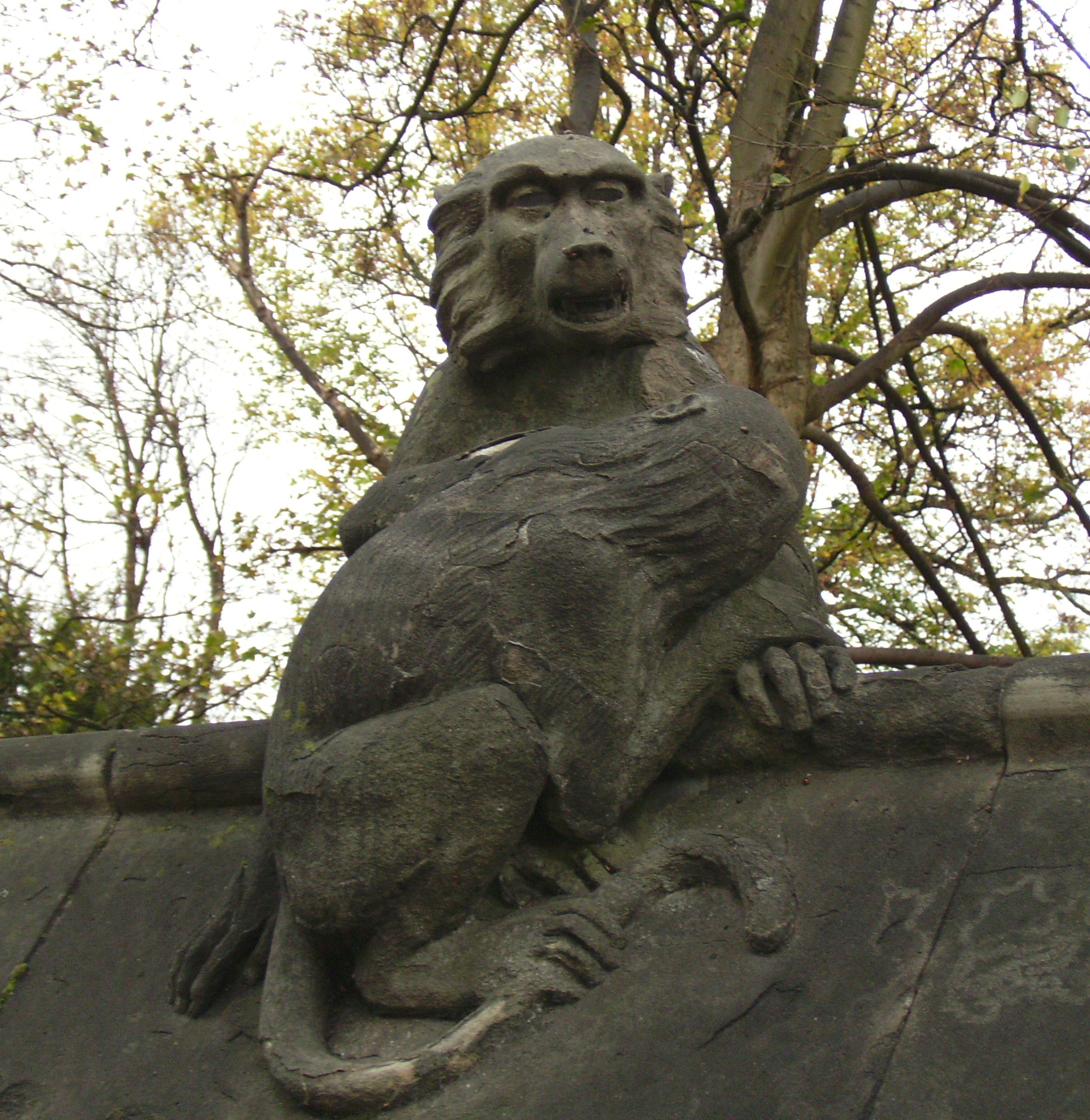
Baboons

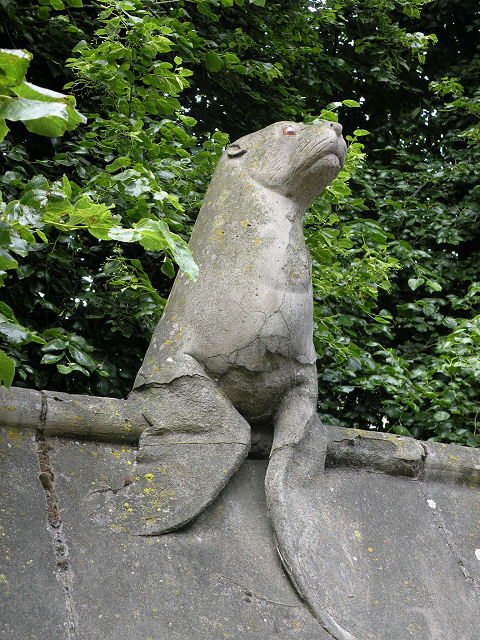
Seal

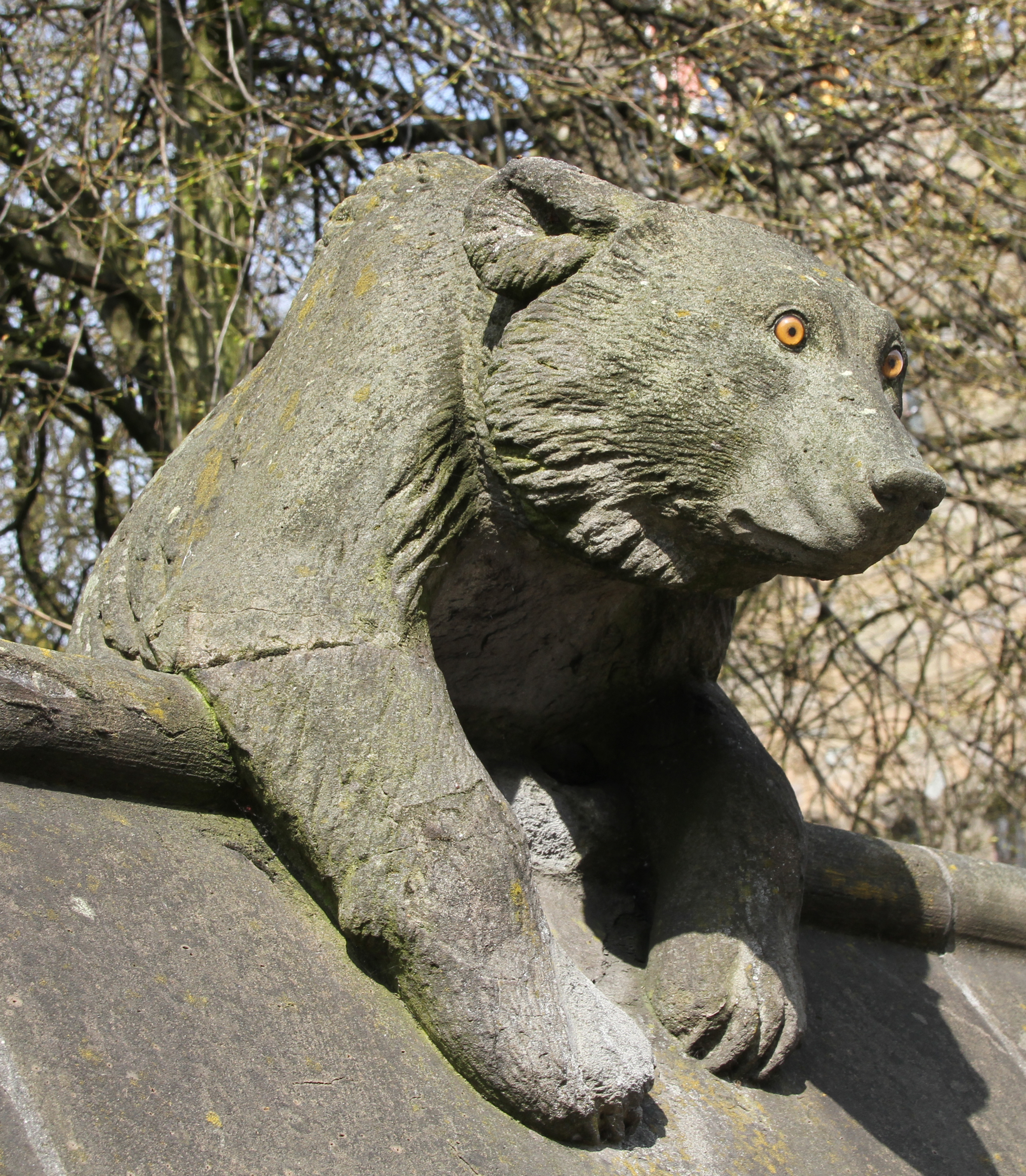
Bear

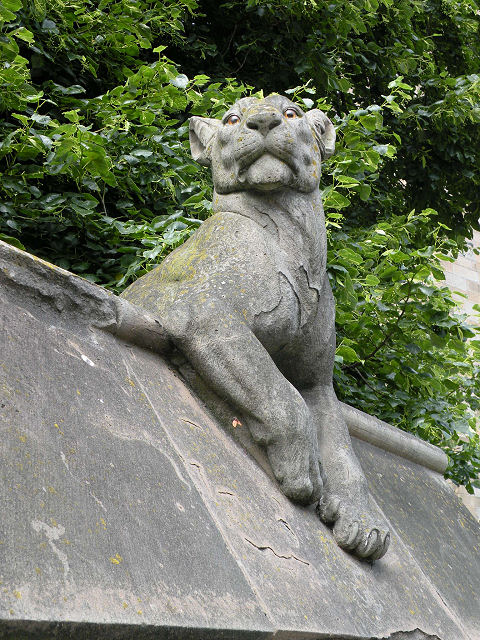
Lioness

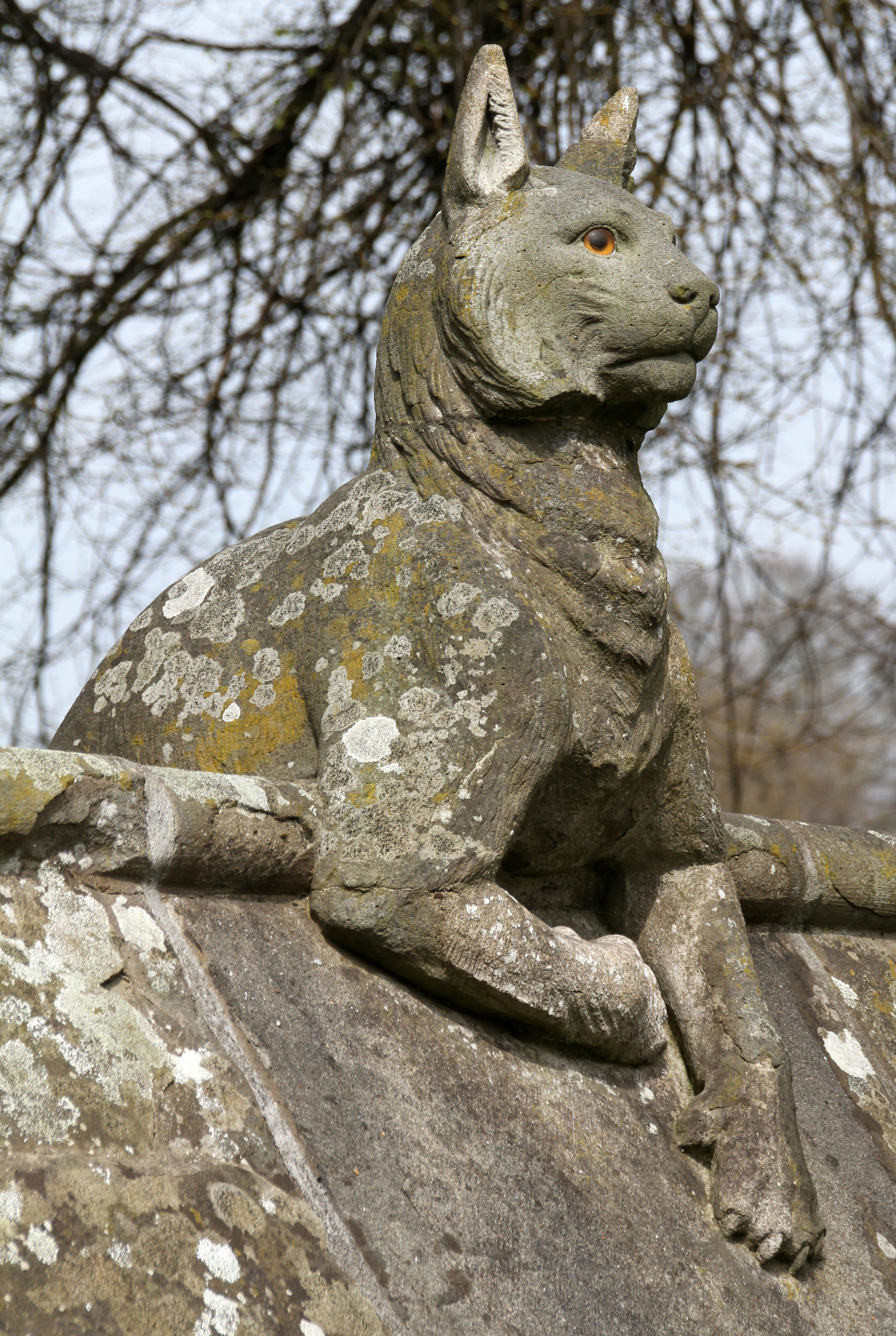
Lynx

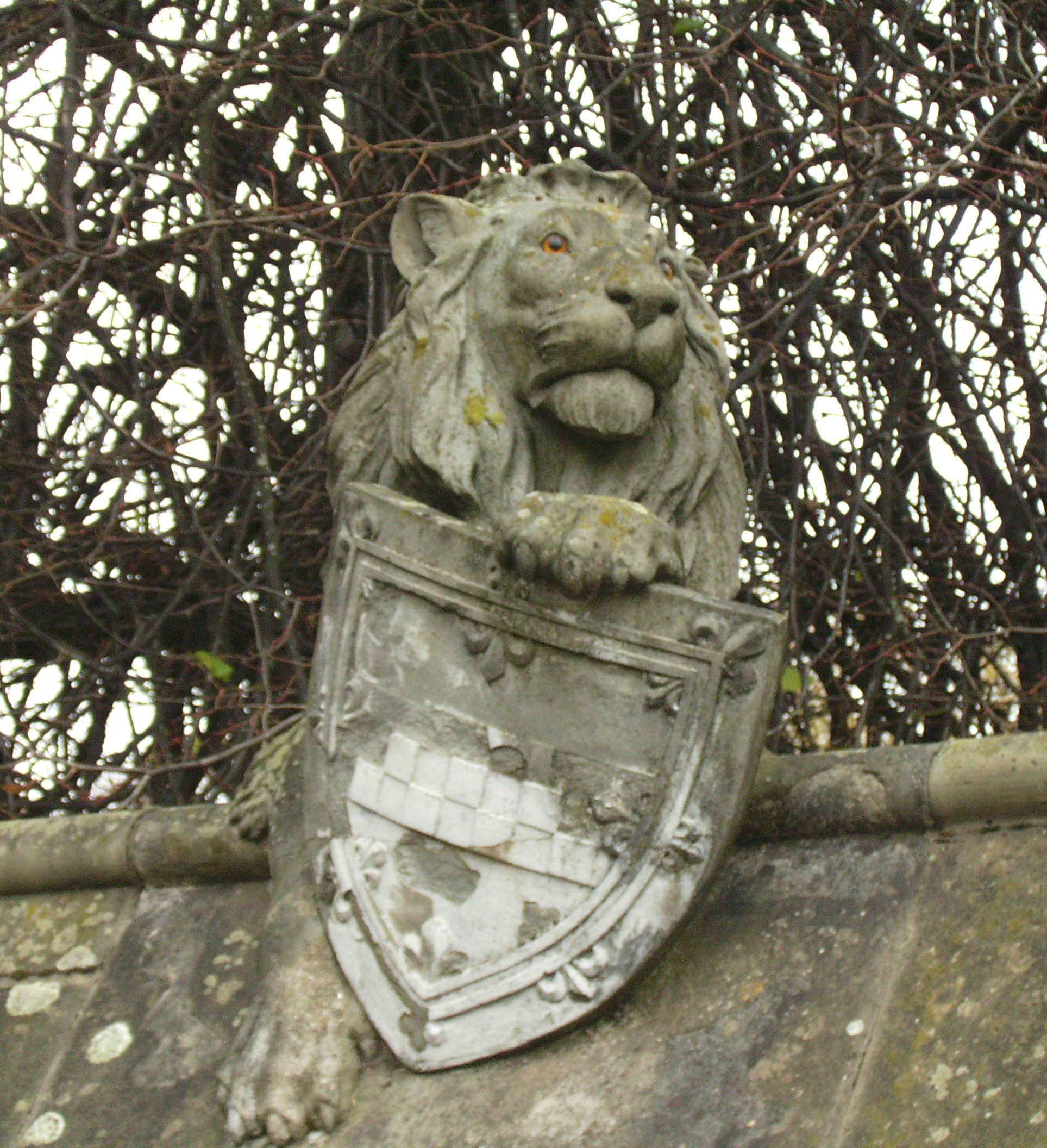
Lion (left)

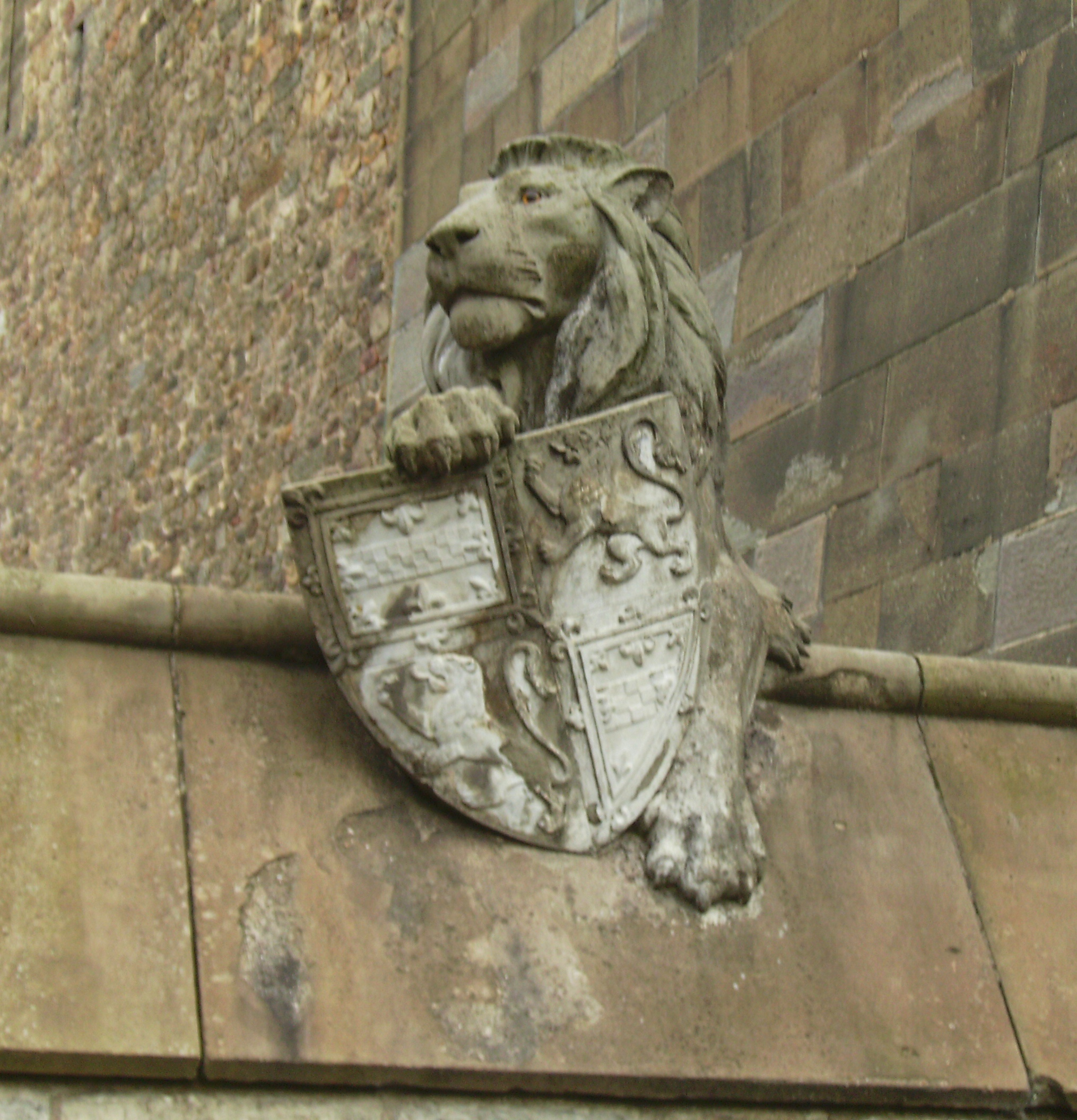
Lion (right)

=== Figures sculptured by Alexander Carrick in 1931 ===
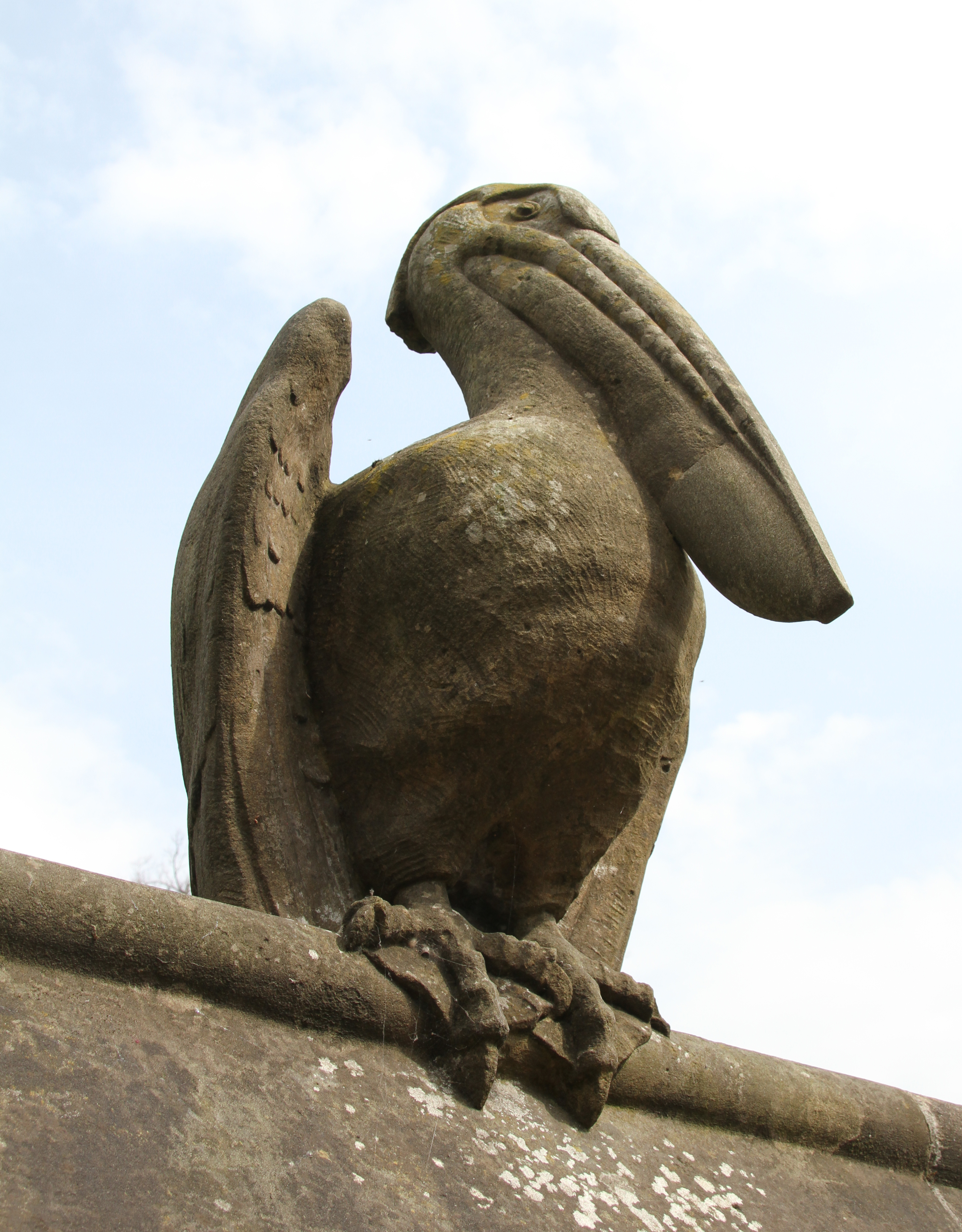
Pelican

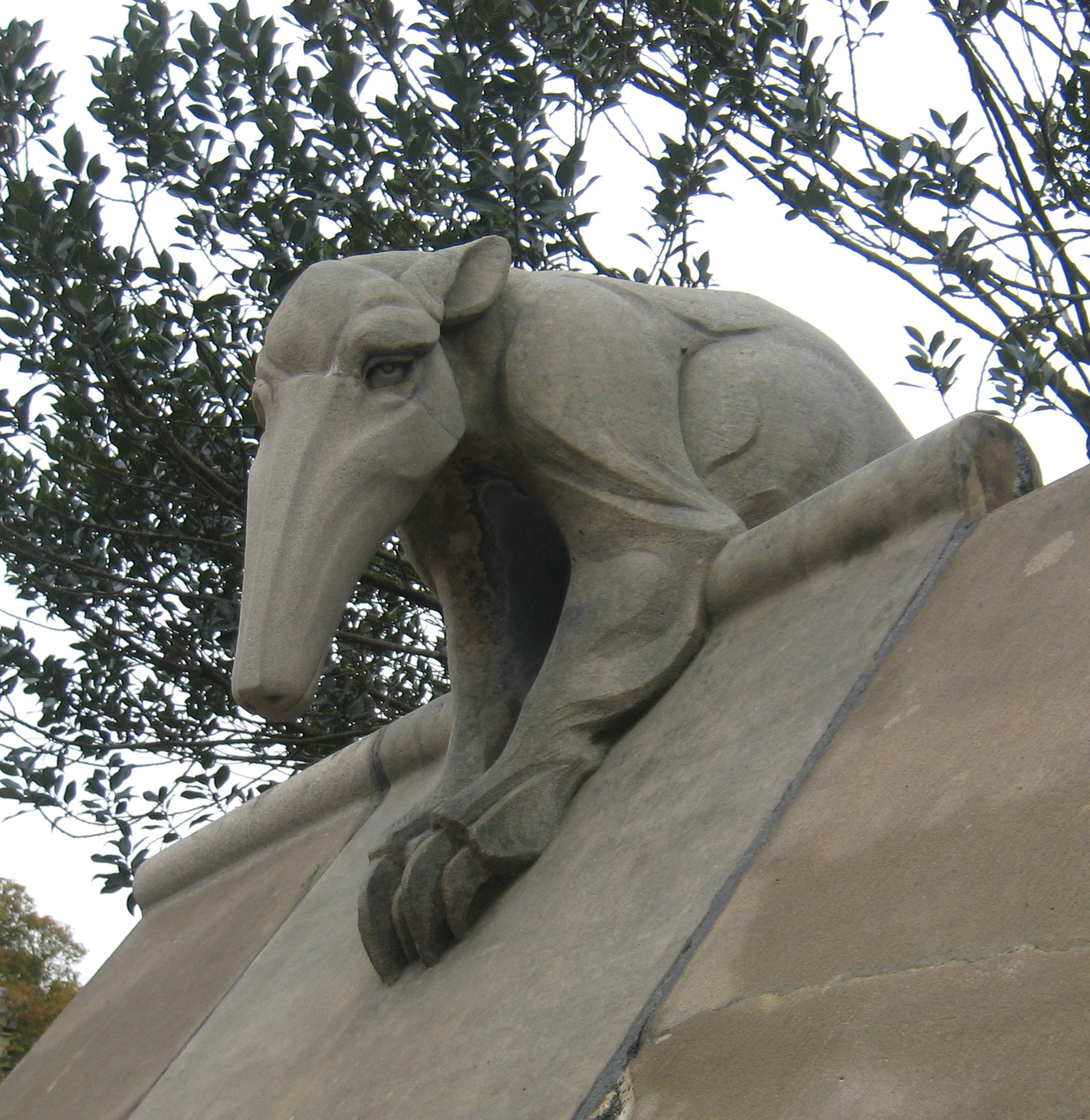
Anteater
(Restored in 2011)

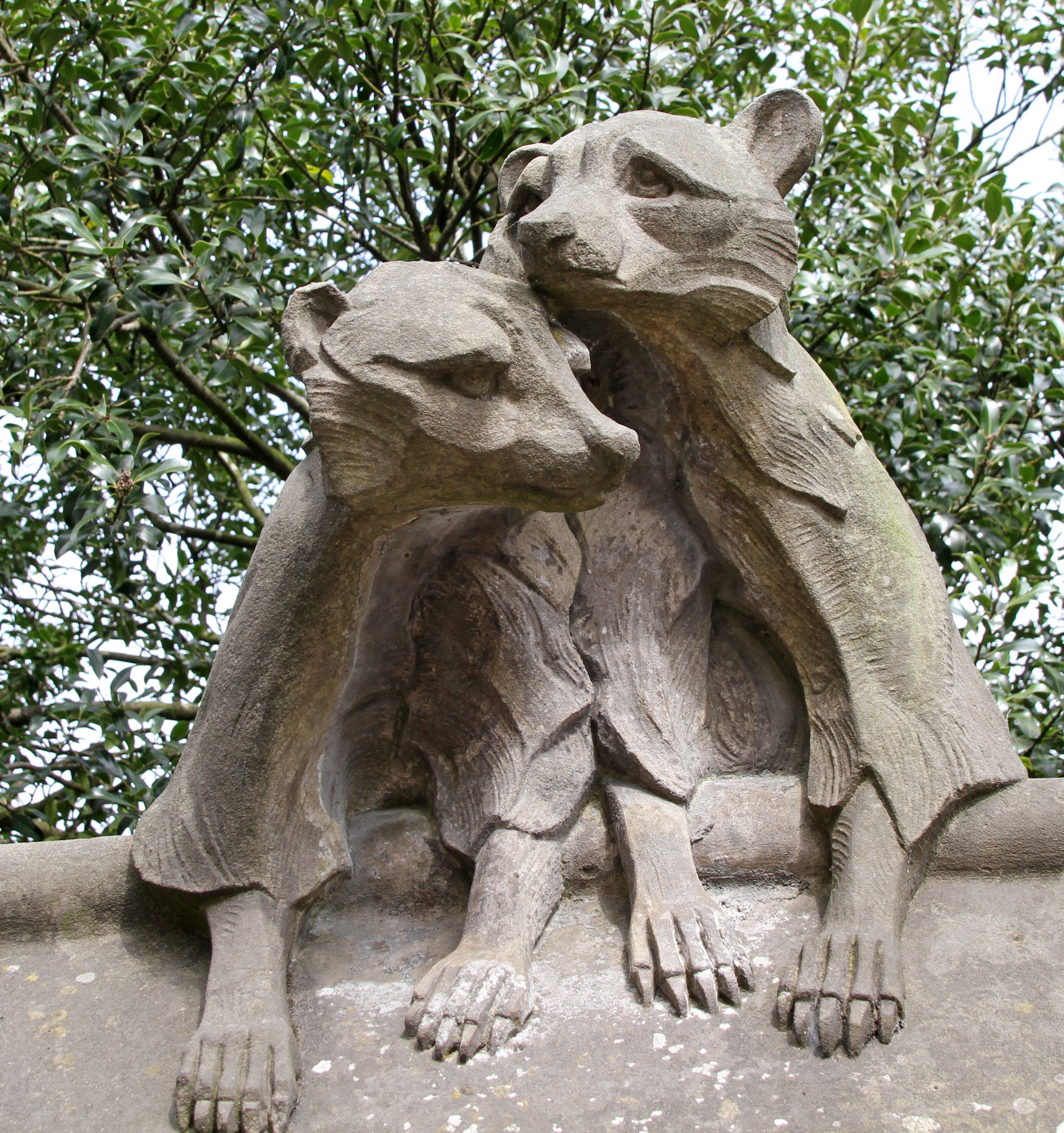
Raccoons

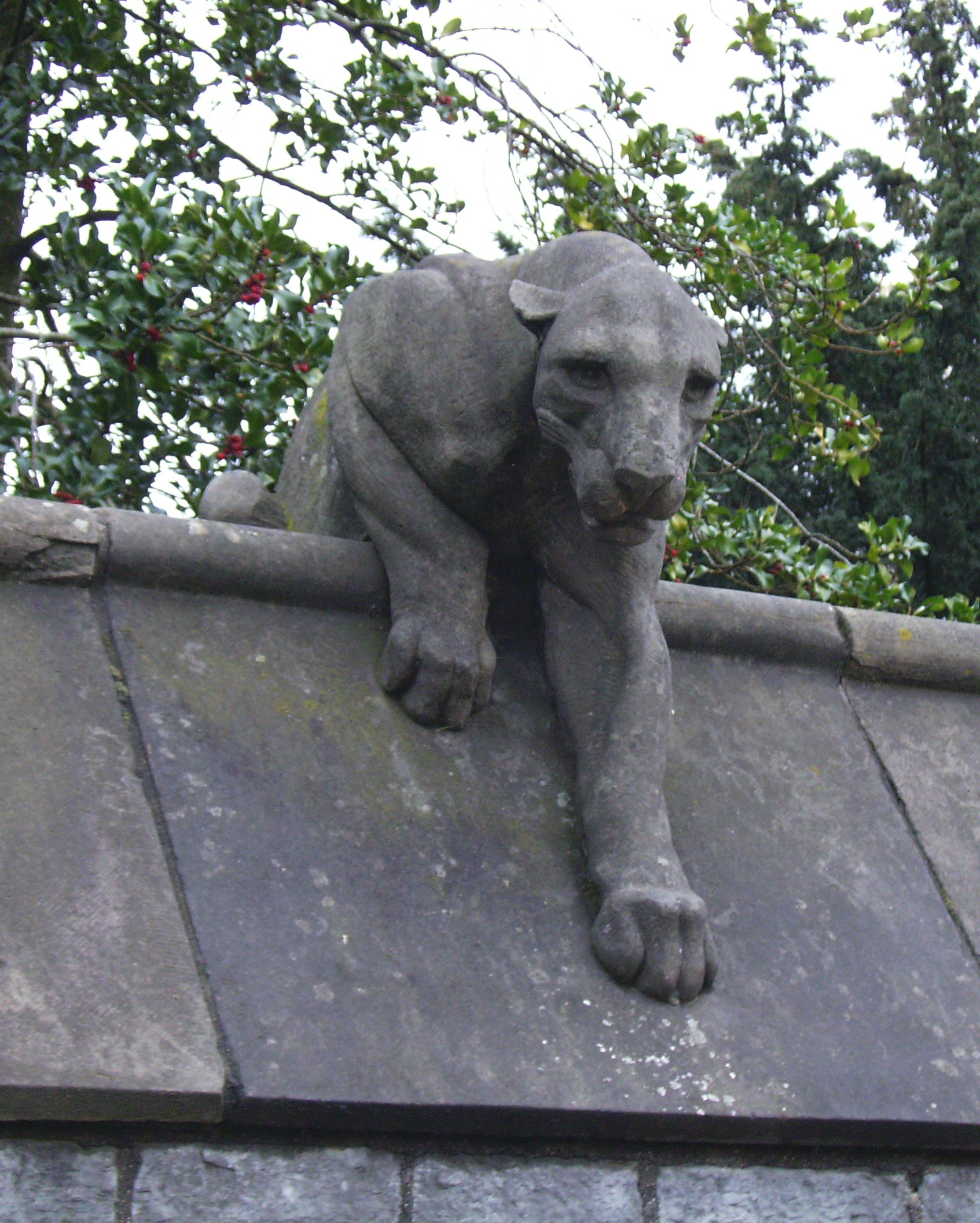
Leopard

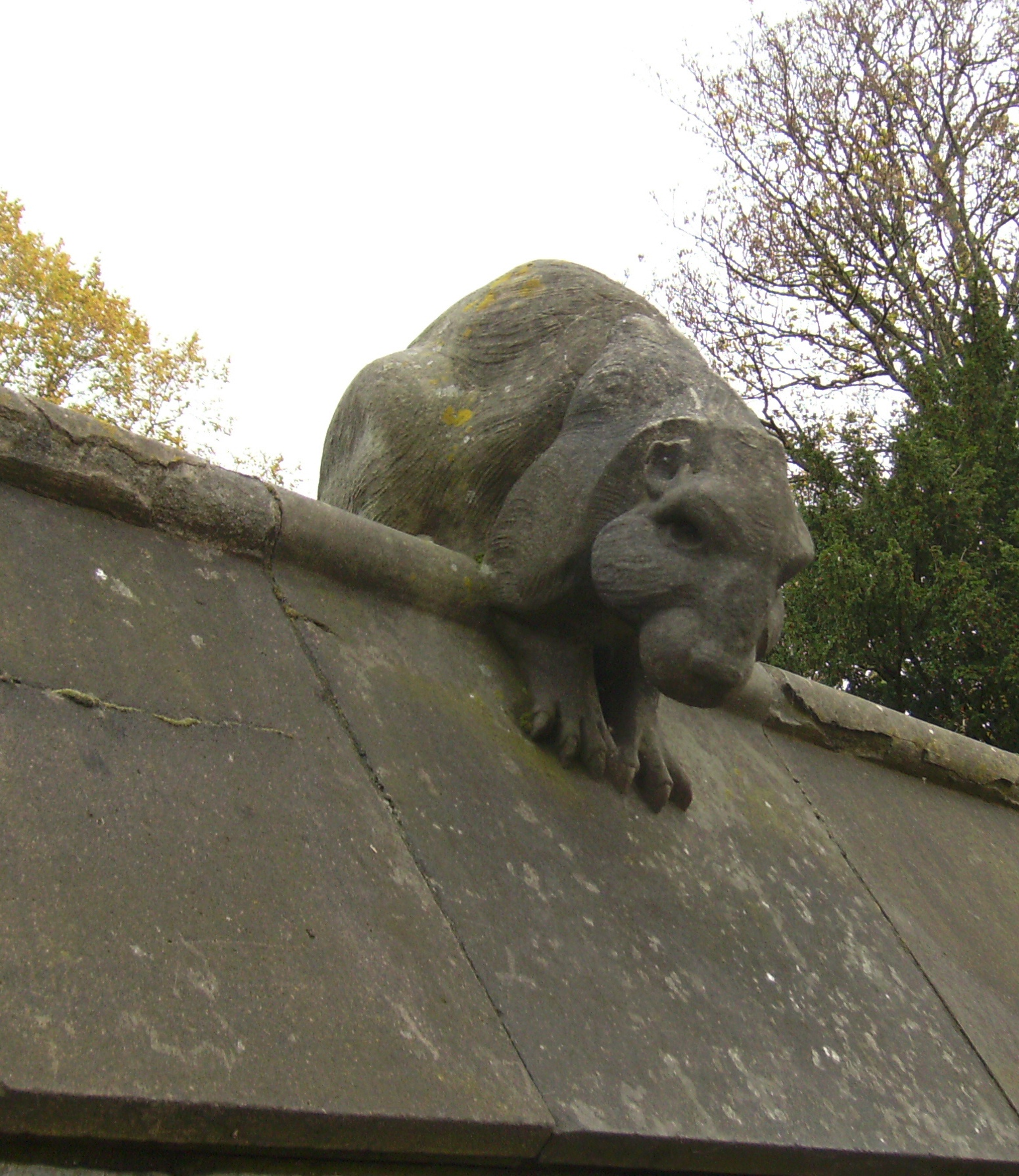
Beaver

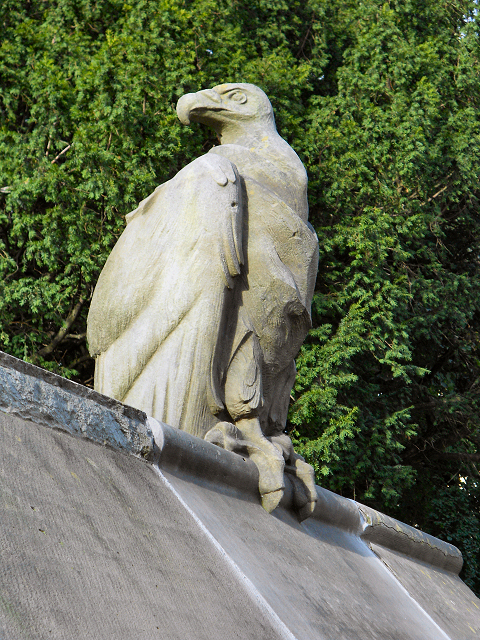
Vulture

== See also ==
- Grade I listed buildings in Cardiff

== Sources ==
- Crook, J. Mordaunt (1981). The Strange Genius of William Burges. Cardiff, UK: Amgueddfa Cymru – Museum Wales. ISBN 9-78072-000259-1.
- — (2013). William Burges and the High Victorian Dream. London: Frances Lincoln. ISBN 978-0-7112-3349-2.
- Hall, Michael (2009). The Victorian Country House from the Archives of Country Life. Aurum Press. ISBN 978-1-84513-457-0.
- Hannah, Rosemary (2012). The Grand Designer: Third Marquess of Bute. Birlinn. ISBN 978-1-78027-027-2.
- Newman, John (1995). Glamorgan. The Buildings of Wales. London, UK: Penguin Books. ISBN 978-0-14-071056-4.
- Sargent, Pauline (1977). Catalogue of the Exhibition of Drawings from the Cardiff Castle Collection (1). Cardiff City Council. OCLC 913363590.
- Williams, Matthew (2004). William Burges. Norwich, UK: Jarrold Publishing. ISBN 9-78184-165139-2.
- — (2014). The essential Cardiff Castle. London: Scala Arts & Heritage Publishers. ISBN 978-1-85759-551-2.
- — (2016). The Animal Wall at Cardiff Castle. Cardiff, Wales: City of Cardiff Council. OCLC 1062307948.
