= USS Herreshoff No. 322 =

United States Navy patrol vessel in commission from 1918 to 1919

History

United States
- Name: USS Herreshoff No. 322
- Namesake: Previous name retained
- Builder: Herreshoff Manufacturing Company, Bristol, Rhode Island
- Completed: 1917
- Acquired: 22 March 1918
- Commissioned: 2 April 1918
- Out of service: 28 August 1919
- Fate: Sold 18 July 1921
- Notes: Operated as private motorboat Herreshoff No. 322 1917–1918; on loan to New York City March–November 1920

General characteristics
- Type: Patrol vessel
- Displacement: 40 tons
- Length: 83 ft 4 in (25.40 m)
- Beam: 12 ft 8 in (3.86 m)
- Draft: 3 ft (0.91 m)
- Speed: 26 knots
- Armament: 1 × 3-pounder gun; 1 × 1-pounder gun

USS Herreshoff No. 322 (SP-2373), also written Herreshoff #322, was a United States Navy patrol vessel in commission from 1918 to 1919.

== Construction, acquisition, and commissioning ==
H. V. Morgan of Philadelphia, Pennsylvania, seeking a way to contribute to the U.S. war effort during World War I, contracted with the Herreshoff Manufacturing Company at Bristol, Rhode Island, for a steel-hulled motorboat built to a naval patrol boat design with the understanding that the U.S. Navy would purchase her after her completion. Morgan's boat, with the builder's name Herreshoff No. 322, was completed in 1917.

On 22 March 1918, the U.S. Navy acquired Herreshoff No. 322 from Morgan for use as a section patrol boat during World War I. She was commissioned on 2 April 1918 as USS Herreshoff No. 322 (SP-2373) .

== Operational history ==
After a period of fitting out and training, Herreshoff No. 322 was assigned to the 3rd Naval District. For the rest of World War I and into the summer of 1919, she patrolled Ambrose Channel, the East River, and Long Island Sound.

On 28 August 1919, Herreshoff No. 322 was withdrawn from service and laid up in the Marine Basin in New York City. The Navy loaned her to the Dock Department of New York City on 9 March 1920, but the Dock Department found her too large for economical operation and returned her to the Navy on 19 November 1920 in exchange for USS YP-3 (ex-USS Sanda (1917)).

== Disposal ==
The Navy sold Herreshoff No. 322 to W. Lindberg of Birmingham, Alabama, on 18 July 1921.
