= USS Sanda =

Patrol vessel of the United States Navy

History

United States
- Name: USS Sanda (1917-1920); USS YP-3 (1920-1942)
- Namesake: Sanda was her previous name retained; YP-3 was her hull number
- Builder: W. E. Haff, New York City
- Completed: 1917
- Acquired: 26 September 1917
- Commissioned: 1917
- Decommissioned: 2 January 1920
- Renamed: YP-3 on 17 July 1920
- Reclassified: "District patrol craft" (YP-3) 17 July 1920; "Small boat" 10 January 1942
- Fate: Hull disposed of by burning April or May 1942; Remains transferred to private company ca. October 1946
- Notes: Operated as private motorboat Sanda 1917; On loan to New York City November 1920-26 April 1941

General characteristics
- Type: Patrol vessel
- Tonnage: 9 Gross register tons
- Length: 36 ft 2 in (11.02 m)
- Beam: 7 ft 2 in (2.18 m)
- Draft: 2 ft 3 in (0.69 m)
- Speed: 10 knots

USS Sanda, later USS YP-3 was a United States Navy patrol vessel in commission from 1917 to 1920 which later served New York City for over 20 years.

== Construction, acquisition, and commissioning ==
Sanda was built in 1917 as the private motorboat M.V.H. by W. E. Haff at New York City. She soon was renamed Sanda. In 1917, the U.S. Navy acquired Sanda from her owner, H. C. Gushing Jr., of New York City, for use as a section patrol boat during World War I. Gushing delivered her to the Navy on 26 September 1917. She never received a section patrol (SP) number, but was commissioned as USS Sanda.

== U.S. Navy service ==
Assigned to the 3rd Naval District Sanda served on section patrol duties in the New York City area for the rest of World War I and throughout 1919. She was decommissioned on 2 January 1920. While she was out of service, the Navy adopted its modern hull number system on 17 July 1920, under which Sanda was classified as a "district patrol craft" (YP) and resdesignated YP-3. Her name was dropped at the same time, so that she became USS YP-3.

== New York City service ==
In March 1920, the Navy had loaned the decommissioned patrol boat USS Herreshoff No. 322 (SP-2373) to the Dock Department of New York City, but the city found Herreshoff No. 322 to be too large for economical operation. On 19 November 1920, the city returned Herreshoff No. 322 to the Navy in exchange for YP-3. On loan to New York City, YP-3 served the city's Dock Department for over 20 years.

== Disposal ==
YP-3 was returned to the Navy on 26 April 1941, but was deemed unfit for further naval service. She was reclassified as a "small boat" in January 1942, and her hull was disposed of by burning in April or May 1942. Sometime around October 1946, the Navy turned over the remains of YP-3 to the United Crane and Shovel Company of New Jersey.
