= AC Merlan =

Association football club in Togo

- Full name: Athletic Club Merlan
- Founded: 1974
- Ground: Stade Oscar Anthony; Lomé, Togo
- Capacity: 2,000
- Chairman: (Togo) Koffi Sronvie
- League: Togolese Championnat National
Home colours	Away colours

AC Merlan is a Togolese football club based in Lomé. They play in the top division in Togolese football. Their home stadium is Stade Oscar Anthony.
