= Thomas Nicholls (sculptor) =

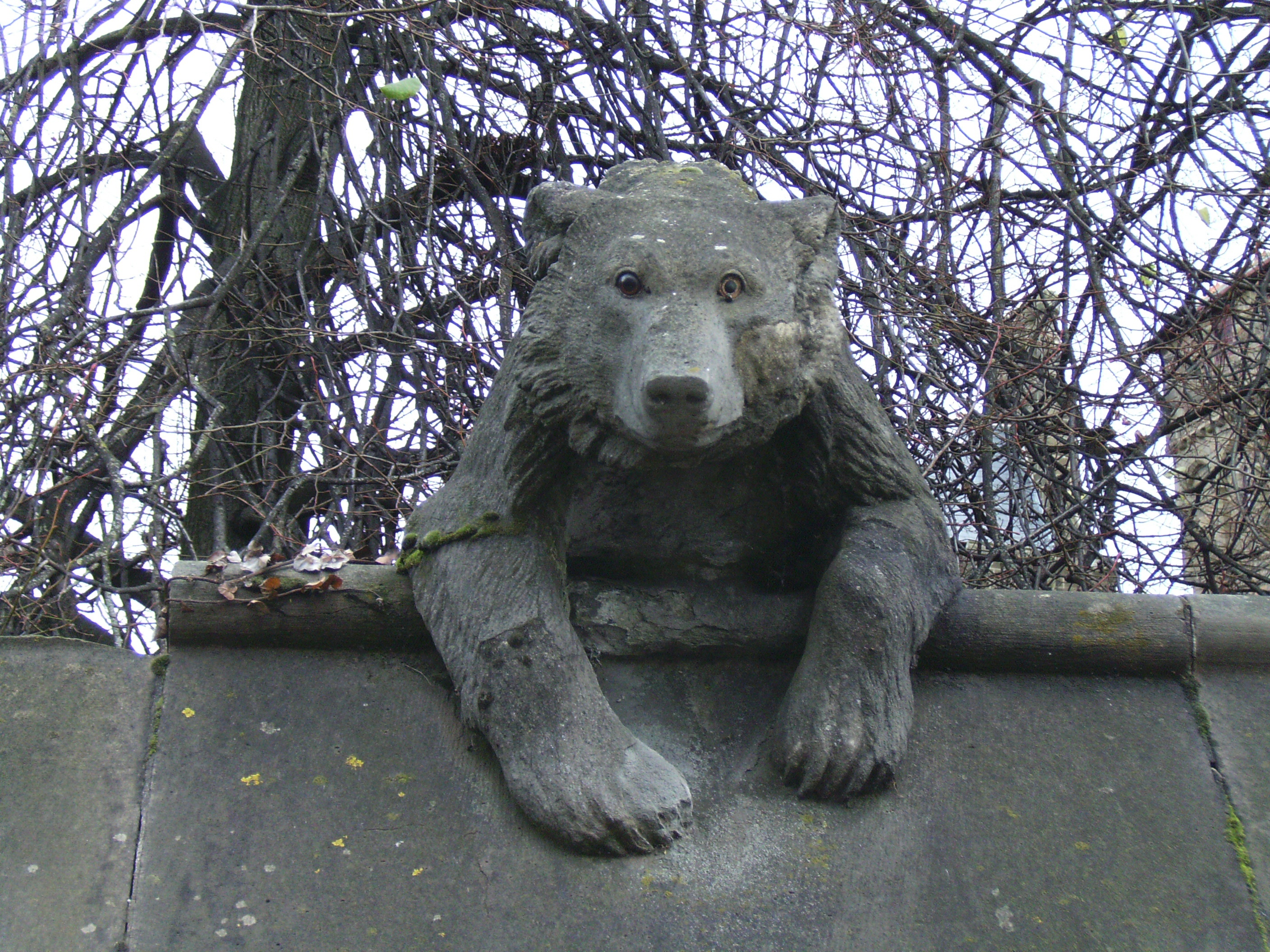
- The Bear – one of Nicholls's sculptures for the Animal Wall
- Born: c. 1825; Westminster, London
- Died: 24 March 1896; Clapham, London
- Notable work: Saint Fin Barre's Cathedral; Cardiff Castle; Castell Coch

Thomas Nicholls (c. 1825 – 24 March 1896) was an English sculptor.

== Life and works ==
Nicholls was born in Westminster, London around the year 1825. In 1858, he began a long partnership with the architect William Burges, beginning with Burges's commission for the embellishment of Gayhurst House in Buckinghamshire for Lord Carrington. Nicholls went on to assist Burges in his first major commission, Saint Fin Barre's Cathedral, Cork subsequently following him to Cardiff, working on both Cardiff Castle and Castell Coch, the fantasy palaces Burges constructed for John Crichton-Stuart, 3rd Marquess of Bute.

Nicholls had two sons who followed him as sculptors, Thomas O. Nicholls (born c.1863) and Edward W. Nicholls (born c.1867). Nicholls died at Clapham in 1896.

== Sources ==
- Crook, J. Mordaunt (2013). William Burges and the High Victorian Dream. London, UK: Frances Lincoln. ISBN 978-0-7112-3349-2.
