= Sanda Stolojan =

Romanian poet, translator and writer

- Born: 19 February 1919; Bucharest
- Died: 2 August 2005 (aged 86); 5th arrondissement of Paris
- Occupation: Interpreter, translator

Sanda Stolojan, née Henriette Lucia Sanda Zamfirescu (19 February 1919, Bucharest – 2 August 2005, Paris) was a Romanian poet, translator and writer. She was a dissident and prominent figure of the Romanian anticommunist exile.

== Life ==
Born and raised in a family of intellectuals and diplomats, she received an elite education in Romania and other European countries. After finishing high school in Paris in 1937, she signed up for studies at the Faculty of Arts at the University of Bucharest. In 1943, she married Vlad Stolojan Filipescu and they attempted to leave communist Romania in 1949, but were arrested and sent imprisoned for the crime of preparation for illegal emigration. In following years, both were convicted of further crimes, eventually losing their home to the authorities.

In 1961, Sanda and Vlad Stolojan managed to leave Romania definitively and settled in Paris. She pursued studies at the École des Hautes Études Commerciales and worked as a translator and interpreter of Romanian language for French presidents. She also became active in the circles of Romanian anticommunist dissidents abroad, especially as a collaborator for Radio Free Europe and as President for the Romanian Human Rights League (Ligue pour la défense des droits de l’homme en Roumanie, LDHR). She also developed an intense literary activity as a writer and poet, and also as founder of the magazine Les Cahiers de l'Est.

In the 1990s, after the fall of the Romanian communist regime, she developed a number of political and cultural activities in Romania and became an honorary member of the National Institute for the Memory of the Romanian Exile (later known as the Institute for the Investigation of Communist Crimes and the Memory of the Romanian Exile).

== Selection of Works ==
- Stolojan, Sanda (1994), Cu De Gaulle în România. Bucharest: Albatros.
- Stolojan, Sanda (1999), Au balcon de l'exil roumain à Paris: avec Cioran, Eugène Ionesco, Mircea Eliade, Vintila Horia, Paris, Montréal: l'Harmattan.
- Stolojan, Sanda (2001), La Roumanie revisitée: Journal 1990-1996, Paris, Montréal, Budapest: l'Harmattan.
- Stolojan, Sanda (2006), Sub semnul depărtării: Corespondență Constantin Noica – Sanda Stolojan, Bucharest: Humanitas.
- Stolojan, Sanda (2007), Amurg senin: Jurnal din exilul parizian 1997-2001, Bucharest: Humanitas.
- Stolojan, Sanda et Stolojan, Vlad (2009) Să nu plecăm toți odată: Amintiri din România anilor 1950, Bucharest: Humanitas.

== Bibliography ==
- Manolescu, Florin (2003), Enciclopedia exilului literar românesc 1945-1989: Scriitori, reviste, instituții, organizații, Bucharest: Compania.
- Scutaru, Beatrice (2012), “The Romanian Anti-Communist Resistance: the League for the Defence of Human Rights of Romania from Paris (1979-1989)”, Peter Jašek (ed.) Anti-Communist Resistance in Central and Eastern Europe, Bratislava: Ústav Pamäti Národa.
- Scutaru, Béatrice (2014), "La Roumanie à Paris : exil politique et lutte anti-communiste", Histoire@Politique. Politique, culture, société, n^{o} 23, May-August 2014.

== Archives ==
Sanda Stolojan's personal archives are currently held in Romania in the collections of the Institute for the Investigation of Communist Crimes and the Memory of the Romanian Exile. The archives of the Romanian Human Rights League, organization that she presided, are currently held at La contemporaine in Nanterre.
