= Sanday, Inner Hebrides =

Tidal island of the Small Isles, in the Scottish Inner Hebrides

Sanday
Sandaigh (Gaelic); Sandee (Scots)

Location
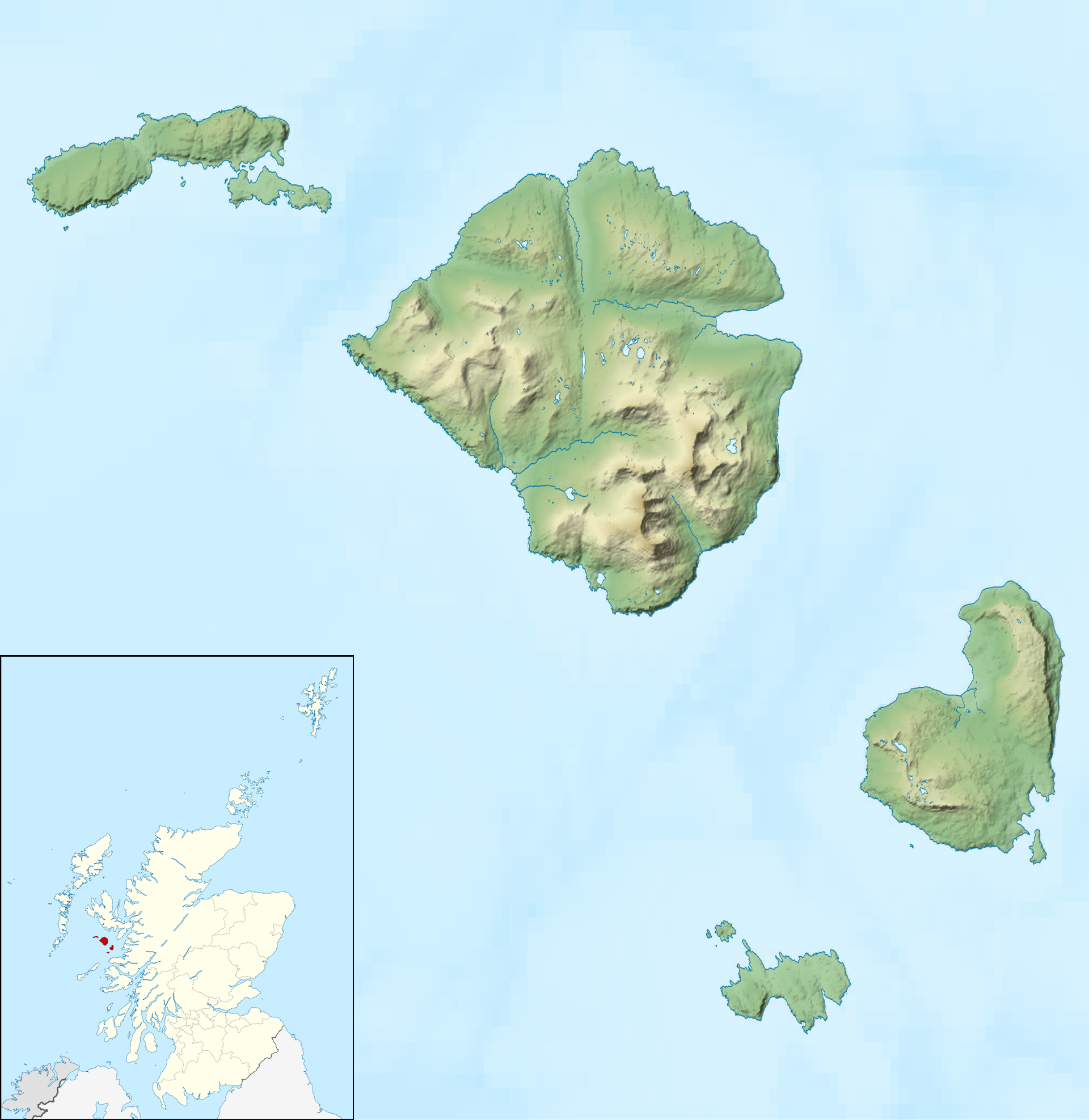
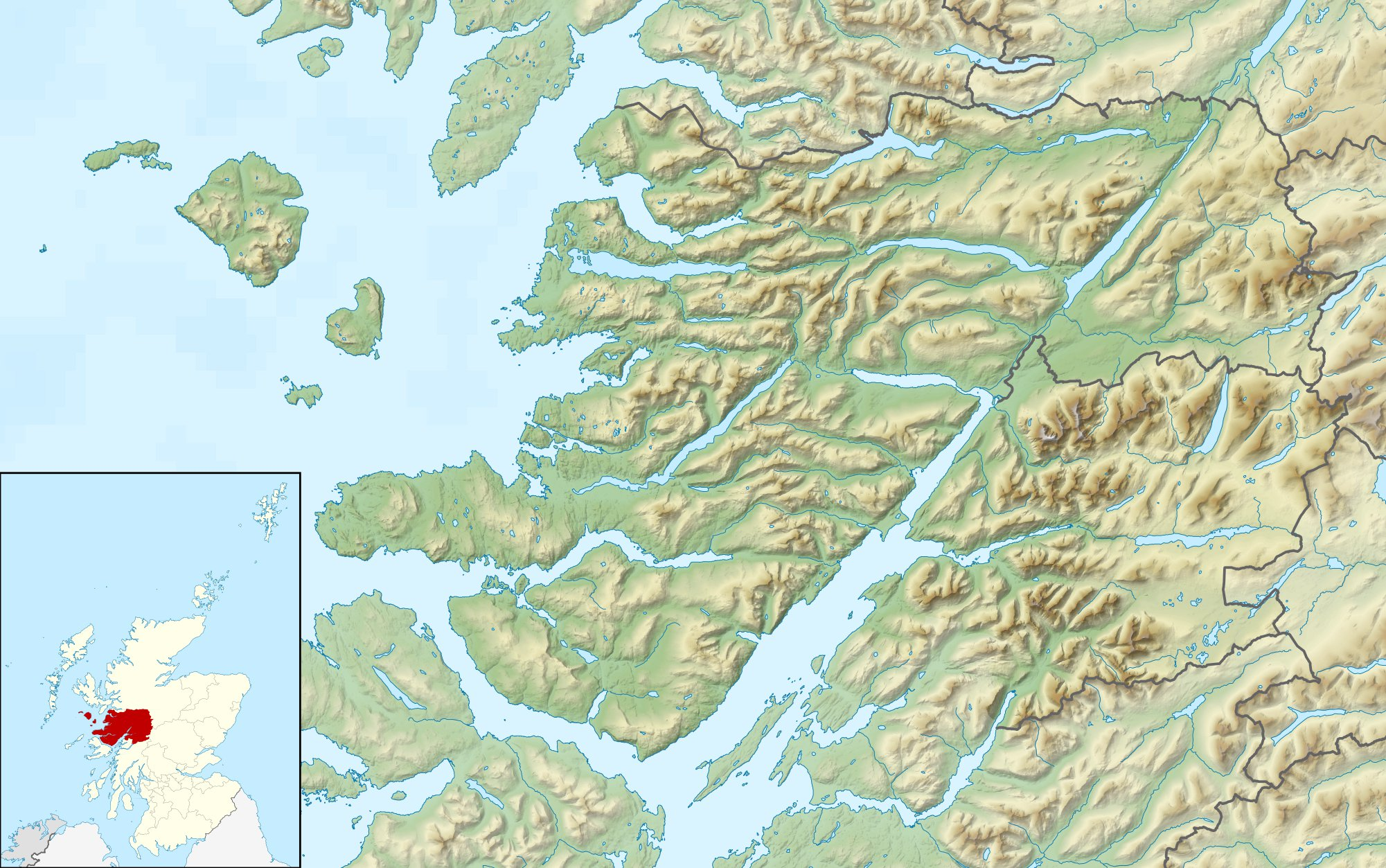
- Sanday shown within the Small Isles Sanday shown within Lochaber
- OS grid reference: NG282043
- Coordinates: 57.05°N 6.49°W

Physical geography
- Island group: Small Isles
- Area: 184 ha (0.71 sq mi)
- Area rank: 114
- Highest elevation: 59 m (194 ft)

Administration
- Council area: Highland
- Country: Scotland
- Sovereign state: United Kingdom

Demographics
- Population: 4
- Population rank: 82=
- Population density: 2.17 people/km^{2}

Sanday (Scottish Gaelic: Sandaigh; Scots: Sandee) is one of the Small Isles, in the Scottish Inner Hebrides. It is a tidal island linked to its larger neighbour, Canna, via sandbanks at low tide, and also connected to the larger island by a bridge. Canna and Sanday form a single community, and are usually described as Canna.

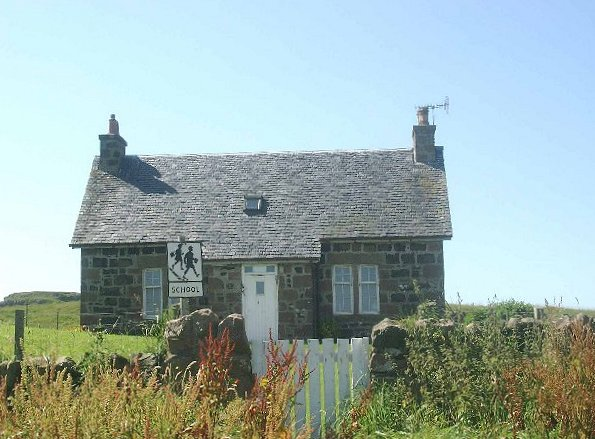
The school

Like its neighbour, Canna, the whole island is owned by the National Trust for Scotland (NTS), and is part of the Lochaber committee area of Highland Council. Whereas Canna is run by the NTS as a single farm, parts of Sanday are used for crofting.

A small primary school on Sanday served the communities of both islands, although is currently closed. A footbridge to the island was built in 1905 to allow pupils from Canna to reach the school regardless of the state of the tide. This bridge was destroyed by storms in 2005, and has been replaced by a road bridge which was completed in April 2006. This new bridge allows vehicular access at all tide levels between the two islands, although parts of the road on Sanday were still covered by water during high tides until the completion of a new road in 2018.

From the mainland the island can be reached by the Caledonian MacBrayne ferry system from the port of Mallaig. Sanday includes rocks that are geologically part of the Paleocene and Eocene British Tertiary Volcanic Province, among some of the youngest rocks found in Scotland.

The largest and most conspicuous building on Sanday is the deconsecrated Catholic church of St Edward, which stands alone on an elevated part of the island, away from the cottages which, together with the school, cluster around the bay facing Canna.

The church, which is also owned by the National Trust for Scotland, was restored and converted into a hostel and Study Centre by the Hebridean Trust. This project was undertaken at the invitation of the owners. The centre is linked to the Archive of Gaelic language and culture that was created by the former owner of Canna and Sanday, John Lorne Campbell. It was successfully completed and opened in 2001 by the Princess Royal. Subsequently, there was water ingress, which caused damage to the interior. This challenge is in the hands of the National Trust for Scotland.

The island is home to a number of different types of wildlife, including puffins, great skua and Manx shearwater.

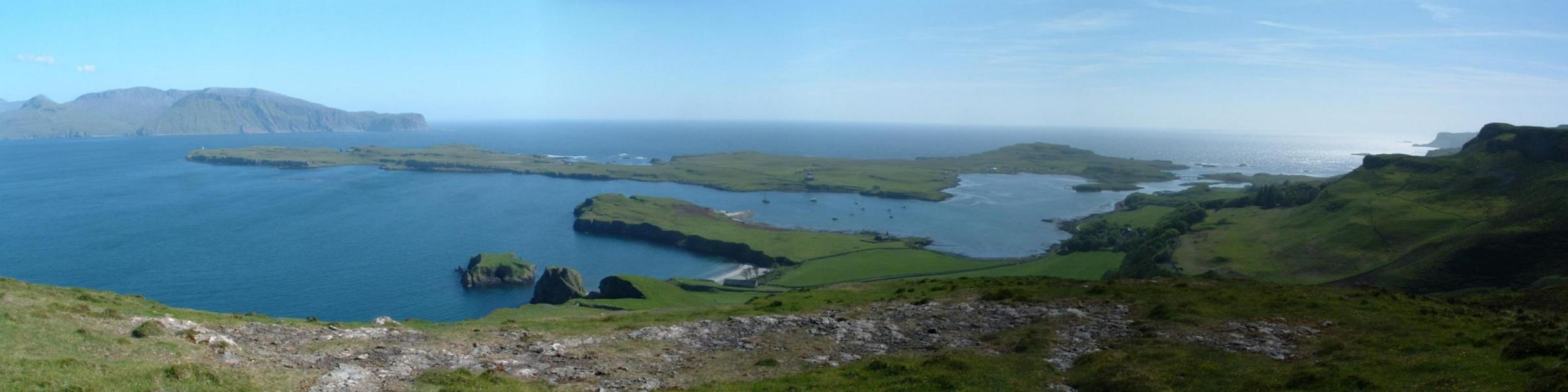
Panorama taken from Compass Hill on Canna, overlooking Canna Bay and Sanday, the island of Rùm in the distance.
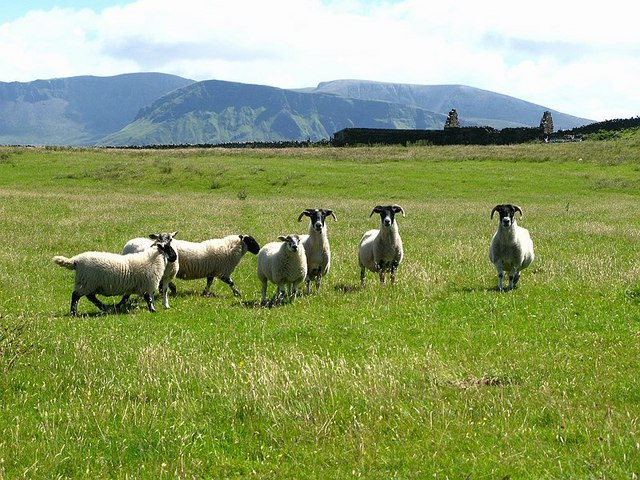

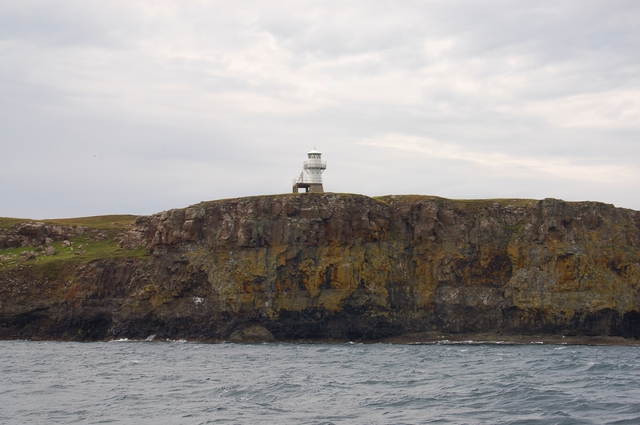

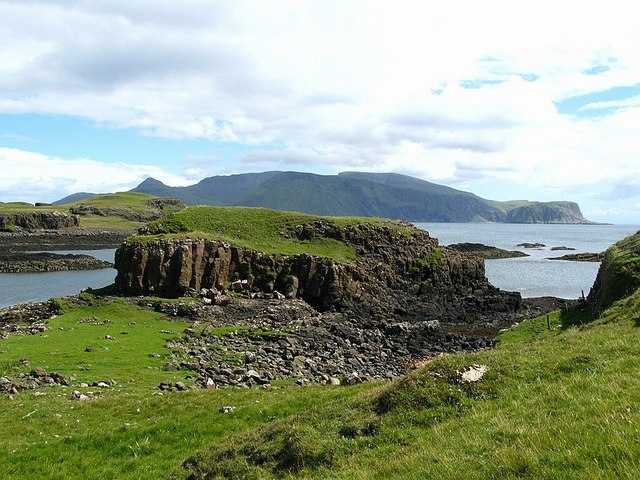

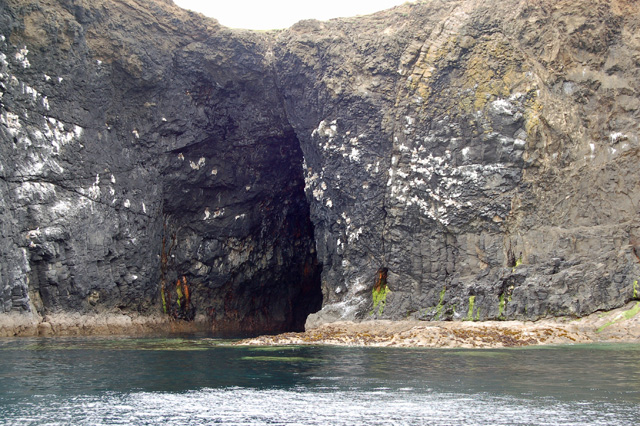

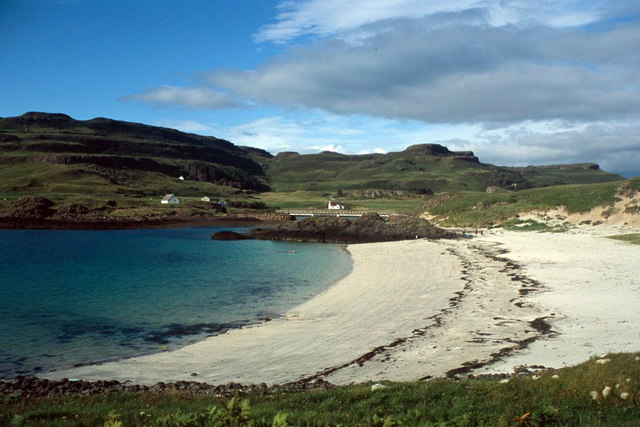

== See also ==
- List of islands of Scotland
