= USS Grosbeak =

USS Grosbeak is a name used more than once by the U.S. Navy:

- USS Grosbeak (1865), was renamed from Fanny and was purchased at Mound City, Illinois on 3 February 1865
- USS Grosbeak (SP-566), was a patrol boat that served during World War I
- USS Grosbeak (AMc-19), was a coastal minesweeper that served during World War II
- USS Grosbeak (AMS-14), was a minesweeper commissioned 18 November 1943
- A contract for constructing Grosbeak (AM-397) was awarded to the Defoe Shipbuilding Company in Bay City, Michigan, but construction was canceled by the US Navy on 12 August 1945 before her keel had been laid
