= History of Newport Beach, California =

Recorded history of American city

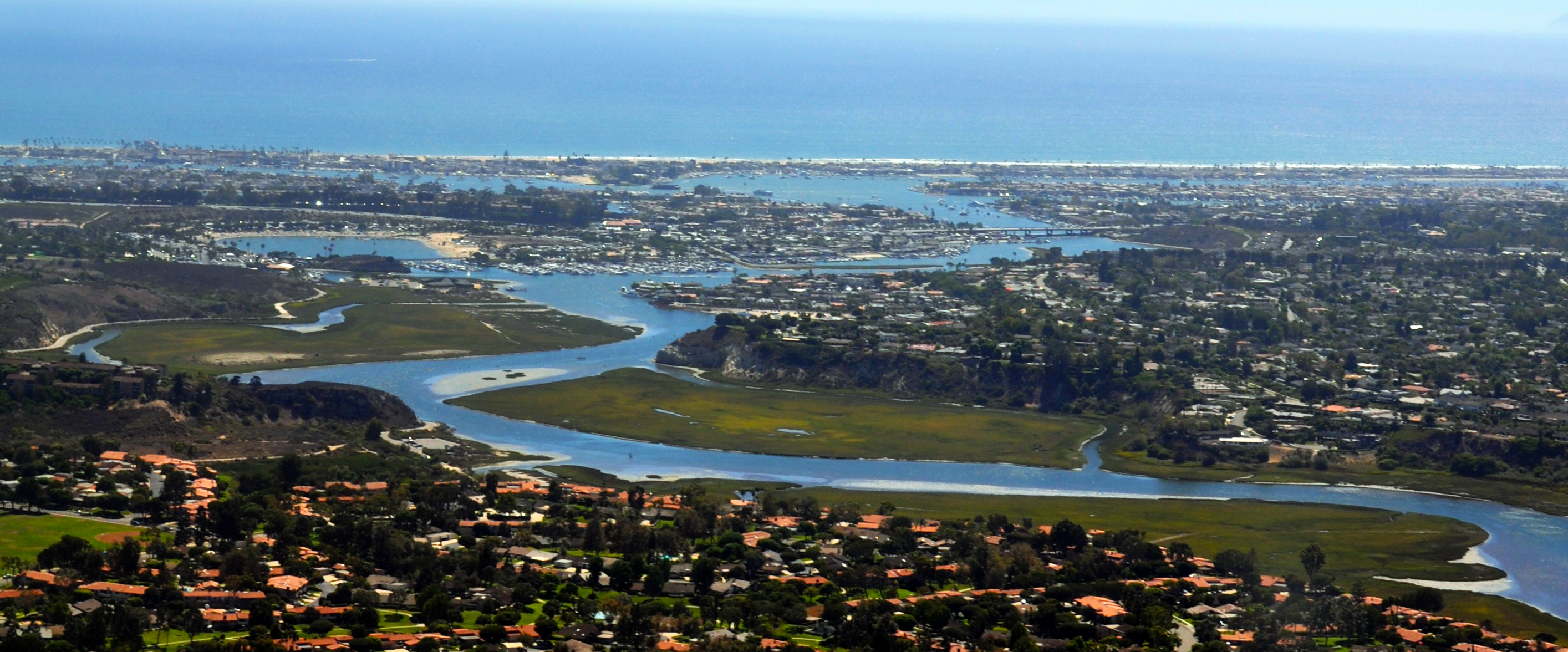
Upper Newport Bay, Newport Beach, California, January 2013

The recorded history of the Newport Beach, California region began when the area was first explored by Europeans in the 1500s. Prior to that time, Native Americans such as the Tongva and Juaneño/Luiseño people had been living in the area for thousands of years. Explorer Juan Rodriguez Cabrillo mapped the coastline in 1542, but it was 200 years before Europeans settled the area. In 1769, Newport was a small portion of the land grant of Don José Antonio Yorba I, first under Spanish and then Mexican rule. After the Civil War, the land was developed by American settlers: for ranching by James Irvine and for shipping by James McFadden. A small settlement was built around McFaddens’ Wharf (at the location where the Newport Pier is today) and it became the largest business of Orange County, California. Following the opening of the San Pedro Harbor in Los Angeles in 1899, the commercial shipping industry in Newport declined. Newport Beach developed into a tourist and recreational boating community. in August 1906, Newport Beach became incorporated as a city.

== Early history ==
For thousands of years, members of the Tongva and Juaneño/Luiseño nations long inhabited this area. In 1542, Juan Rodríguez Cabrillo first sailed the coast of California for New Spain and in 1602, Sebastián Vizcaíno mapped the coast for the Spanish Empire. Jose Antonio Yorba (1746–1825), known also as Don José Antonio Yorba I, was an early colonizer of Spanish California (then known as Alta California). Born in San Sadurni de Noya in the Spanish province of Catalonia, Yorba first came to the New World as an officer in the Gaspar de Portolà Expedition of 1769. For his service, Yorba was awarded with an enormous land grant from the Spanish Empire in 1801 that comprised a significant portion of today's Orange County in Southern California. Covering some 62,512 acres (252.98 km^{2}), Yorba's great rancho included the lands where the cities of Olive, Orange, Villa Park, Santa Ana, Tustin, Costa Mesa and Newport Beach stand today.

From this Spanish period, the Ranchos began trading hides with US merchants in Boston for goods from New England, sailing around South America. The Ranchos also traded with English and European merchants. This trade continued through the Mexican period (1823–1848) as immigrants were offered land if they converted to the Catholic religion and became Mexican citizens, which many did. Many Anglo immigrants married into Spanish families, becoming Californios inheriting and acquiring lands and ranchos.

== Mexican Ranchos ==
When Mexico gained independence from Spain and took ownership of California in 1821, it was soon evident that the era of mission-domination of virtually all land was over. Although the Yorbas-Peraltas retained the 65,512 acres they had been granted by the Spanish, adjacent land became available. By 1837, 35-year-old Jose Sepulvada was awarded an enormous tract and five years later was again awarded land. Combined, his ownership extended almost 47,000 acres, including north to the Santa Ana Mountains, east to today's 55 Freeway, and south to Laguna Beach. It was later discovered that this grant did not include the land surrounding Newport Bay and the oceanfront at Newport Beach, for each was considered worthless.

Like most California ranchos, Sepulveda's Rancho San Joaquin was soon largely self-sufficient, producing most of its everyday needs by growing virtually all its produce and beef cattle. Sepulveda focused his attention on his grasslands, largely ignoring the abundance of the ocean adjacent to his property. Comfortable on horseback, he probably never even ventured near the water, a fact noted by a bemused Richard Henry Dana in his recounting of this era in Two Years Before the Mast: "These people have no boats of their own. . . . It is difficult to fish from the back of a horse."

Sepulveda lived the life of a wealthy ranchero. He claimed to have 3,000 horses and 14,000 cattle. He loved to host large family reunions on his enormous rancho, proudly showing off his 14 children. He was an avid gambler, and legend has it that he won $25,000, 1,000 horses, 500 heifers, and 500 sheep on one race. He grew rich when the Gold Rush of 1849 brought hungry prospectors. For a while, his wild, rangy, Mexican cattle were prized, and he profited from driving them all the way to San Francisco.

In 1852, six years after the United States took possession of California, a law was passed requiring each ranchero to prove ownership to retain his land. Requiring expensive surveys and court appearances, Sepulveda's lavish lifestyle left him short of cash. A devastating three-year drought increased his problems. Plagued by his debts and the death of much of his herd, Sepulveda sold his rancho in 1864 to Flint, Bixby, Irvine, and Company, beginning the long-lasting Irvine era.

== Establishment of Newport ==
When the ranchos were sold, some entrepreneurs were drawn to the Newport area. Two of them, James Irvine and James McFadden, emerged as leading visionaries, each with markedly different dreams for Newport. Irvine arrived with a love of the land and plans to prosper by amassing a great deal of ranch land. McFadden had an entirely different dream – he was intent on creating a town by dividing his land and selling it to as many who would buy, Convinced that the more settlers he could entice to Newport, the sooner it would emerge as an important commercial center, he was regarded as Newport's first passionate promoter.

James Irvine was born in Ireland, the eighth of nine children. In 1846, at the age of 19, he joined the parade crossing the Atlantic, bound for New York. He continued his journey west, becoming a miner and a merchant. He was soon prosperous enough to partner with the Flints and Bixby to establish a wool business. When they had amassed enough money, they bought Sepulveda's rancho. They were also ready with cash when the Yorbas'- Peraltas' rancho was dissolved by court order. Soon, they were the largest landholders in the region, dominating over 100,000 acres. Tirelessly focused on ranching, Irvine and his descendants continued to own enormous tracts of land, their Irvine Ranch intricately intertwined with the evolution of Newport Beach.

James McFadden, one of 11 children of Scottish ranchers, journeyed to California in 1868 and immediately saw the potential of the Newport area. Soon joined by his brother, Robert, they began buying as much as possible and subdividing it immediately, seeking buyers. After the Civil War, the parade of settlers significantly increased. While most sought prime agricultural land, some did gravitate to the Newport area and a small settlement was born.

Desperate for materials and food, residents of this small settlement were thrilled when Captain Samuel Sumner Dunnels cautiously guided his 105-ton, flat-bottomed steamer Vaquero into the virtually unexplored Newport Bay, then known as San Joaquin Bay, on September 10, 1870. Heavily loaded with 5,000 shingles and 5,000 feet of lumber from San Diego, he entered the bay slowly. He was successful, and Newporters finally had a source of needed supplies. Before long, he had constructed a small wharf and warehouse near the west end of today's Newport Bay Bridge.

During its early years, Newport had many names, including Bolsa de Gengara and Bolsa de San Joaquin. When settlers began to arrive, an easier to pronounce, more prestigious name was wanted. Although there is no proof of its source, most believe that the Name "Newport" came from one of two sources: 1) Some credit Dunnels, who exuberantly proclaimed he had found a "new port" when he crossed the bar. 2) Others contend that an employee of the Irvine Ranch suggested it at a meeting concerning commerce on the bay.

In 1875, James McFadden and his younger brother Robert acquired the landing and for the next nineteen years operated a thriving commercial trade and shipping business. However, the bay was not yet a true harbor and sand bars and a treacherous bay entrance caused the McFadden Brothers to move the shipping business to the oceanfront by constructing a large pier on the sand spit that would become the Balboa Peninsula. The site was ideal because a submarine canyon (Newport Submarine Canyon), carved along with Newport Bay by the ancient Santa Ana River, provided calm waters close to the shore.

In 1888, the McFaddens decided their shipping business would be more successful if they moved it from the inner shores of the bay to the oceanfront, where it was connected by rail to Santa Ana. So they built McFaddens’ Wharf at the location where the Newport Pier is today. “McFadden Wharf soon became the largest business in newly created Orange County”, California. It lasted for eight years, the McFadden Wharf area was a booming commercial and shipping center and a company town began to grow. However, in 1899, the Federal Government allocated funds for major improvements to a new harbor at San Pedro, which would become Southern California's major seaport. The McFadden Wharf and railroad were sold to the Southern Pacific Railroad that same year, signaling the end of Newport Bay as a commercial shipping center.

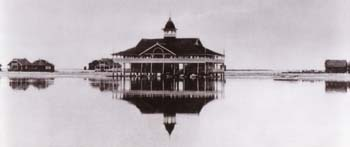
Balboa Pavilion, 1906

In 1902, James McFadden sold his Newport townsite and about half of the Peninsula to William S. Collins, who saw Newport Bay's resort and recreation potential. Collins took on Henry E. Huntington as a partner in the Newport Beach Company. Huntington had acquired the Pacific Electric railway system and used it to promote new communities outside of Los Angeles.

In 1905, the Pacific Electric “Red Cars” were extended to Newport. Collins began dredging a channel on the north side of the bay and deposited the sand and silt on tidelands that would become Balboa Island. Formerly known as Balisle, this enchanting little island was not always easy to get to. Newport Harbor was still largely undredged, and sailboats were often the only way to get around. Robert McFadden, an early Balboa Harbor developer had established a successful fishing wharf on the Balboa Peninsula.

In 1906, the Pacific Electric line Red Cars began service to the Balboa Peninsula and Pavilion, and soon, the Red Cars would bring thousands of summertime visitors from Los Angeles.

In 1906, the Balboa Pavilion was completed along with her sister project, the Balboa Pier (for the purpose of attracting lot buyers to the Balboa Peninsula part of Newport). Back then, bay-front houses sold for as little as $500.

Further, in 1906, Newport Beach became a tourist destination with the arrival of the Pacific Electric Railway. The railway terminated at the Balboa Pavilion.

Still further, in August 1906, Newport Beach became incorporated as a city.

In 1908, John Scarpa, an Italian gondolier, put together the first Christmas lights boat parade in Newport Harbor. This started a long, yearly tradition that has lasted to this day.

In 1908 and 1909, with permission of the Orange County Board of Supervisors, William Collins moved his small dredge to the eastern part of the Newport bay, a mud flat called "Snipe Island", and begin cutting a channel along the north side of the bay across from the Pavilion, piling the sand and silt up on the mud flat and thus Balboa Island was born. Balboa Island was a summer vacation place. Most homes had no heaters, and were closed up in the winter. Families came down for the entire summer. Cooking was done on a gasoline stove as there was no gas or electricity. Coal oil lanterns and candles were used.

In 1909, the first "seawall", a wooden bulkhead that protected part of the island, was built.

In 1910, the McFaddens sold Newport, Lido and Balboa Island for US$35,000.

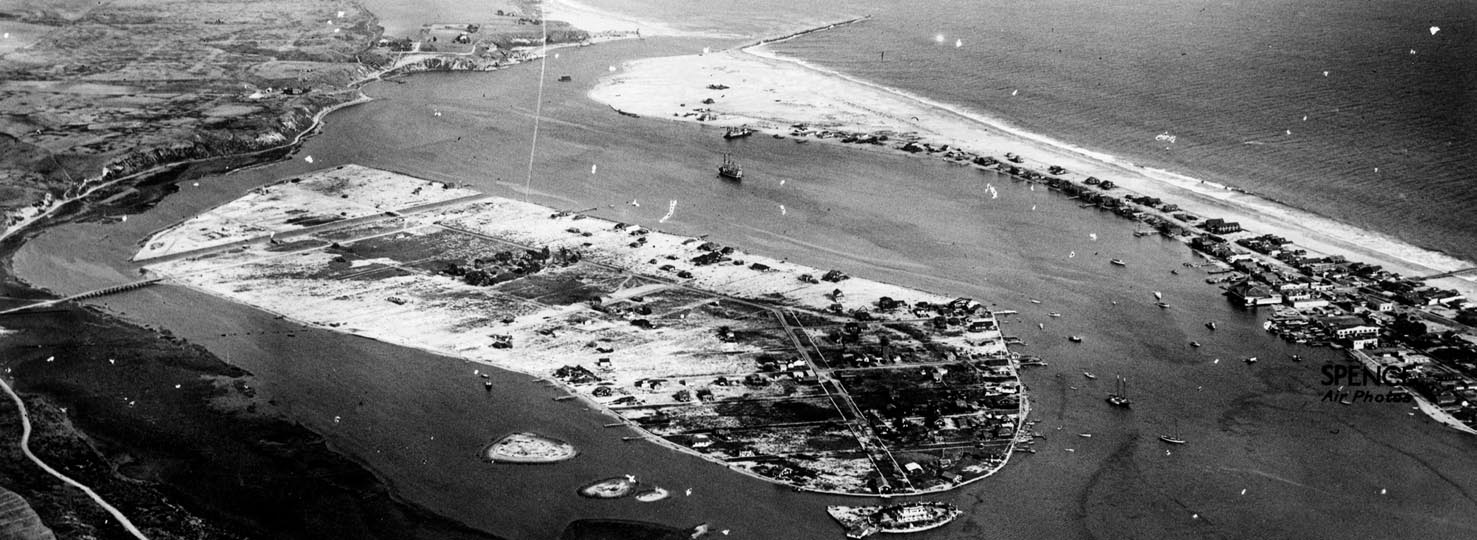
Newport Beach and Balboa Island, 1921

In 1912, the seawall was partially replaced by a cement barrier (cheap German cement).

in 1914, water lines to the island were first laid.

In 1916, Balboa Island was annexed to city of Newport Beach.

In 1919, water for the Island came from the famous "Wooden Water Tower" built on Agate St. (removed in 1929).

In 1920, Park Ave. was the only road paved on the island. People had outhouses behind their house as there was no sewer. They buried trash in big holes dug in vacant lots. Also in this same year, gas utility came to the Island (heating, cooking, lights).

In 1919, Joseph Beek, while still a student at Pasadena City College, was enchanted with the area, and became one of Collins' salesmen. Joe Beek played a crucial role in the development of Balboa Island, and spent a lifetime devoted to it. Beek got the first contract for a ferry between the island and Balboa Peninsula.

In 1920, the first car was pushed across the bay (for 10 cents). In 1922, Joe Beek got a 15-year franchise, using the ferry boat Joker, which could hold two cars. That franchise has continued until this day, with three 64 ft (20 m) boats that can carry three cars. He later served as Secretary of the California State Senate until his death in 1968.

In 1922, the seawall was rebuilt.

In 1923, the city annexed Corona del Mar.

In 1926, the Pacific Coast Highway was built through the city. Also a bridge over the Upper Bay was built.

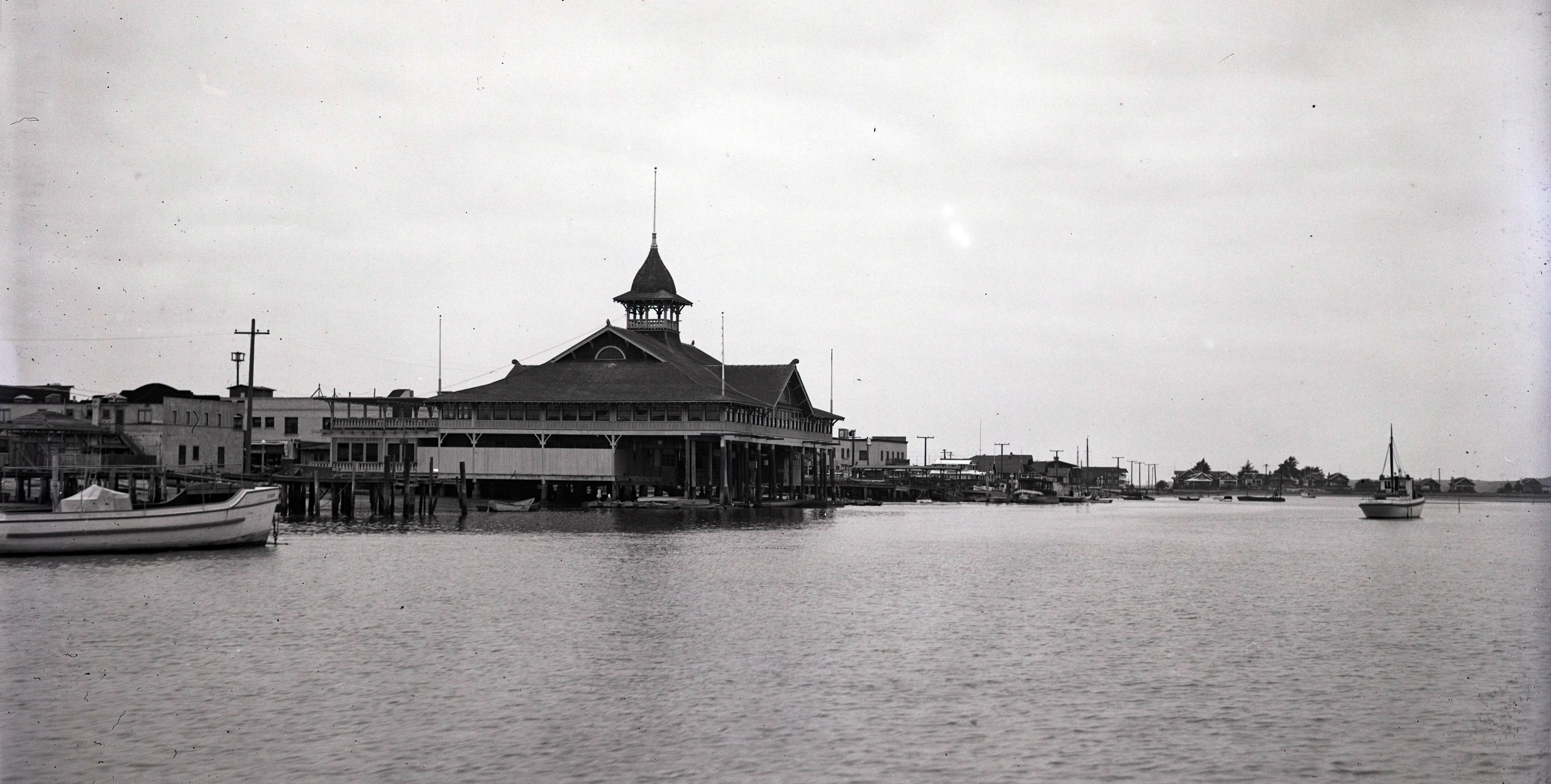
Balboa pavilion and surrounding docks in Newport Beach, circa 1924

In 1929, The Grand Canal wooden bulkhead and walk were rebuilt in concrete.

In 1936, Newport Harbor was officially dedicated. This occurred after a $1.8 million project dredged out the sandbars and extended the jetties.

In 1938, James Cagney, a famous Hollywood actor at the time, purchased Collins Island. The US Coast Guard used this island during World War II and Cagney eventually sold the island in 1948.

Later in the 20th century, Newport Beach became the home of a number of famous celebrities. The most popular Newport Beach celebrity was John Wayne, also known as “the Duke”. Orange County later named its airport for Wayne. Other celebrities residing and/or keeping boats in Newport Beach included James Cagney, Humphrey Bogart, Shirley Temple, and Errol Flynn. Furthermore, "Roy Rogers and Dale Evans" as well as George Burns resided in Newport Beach. Other notables included television star Buddy Ebsen (Beverly Hillbillies, Barnaby Jones), as well as Johnny Carson’s most frequent guest host, Joey Bishop. Arizona Senator and 1964 Republican Presidential candidate Barry Goldwater spent many summers living at the Balboa Bay Club.

Newport Beach also became a hub for tennis stars, especially from Australia. Australian professionals Rod Laver, Roy Emerson, Syd Ball and Phil Dent all lived in Newport Beach at various stages in their careers. This in turn spawned a new generation of tennis stars from Newport Beach, Taylor Dent, Carsten Ball and Antony Emerson.

In 1953, the third international jamboree of the Boy Scouts of America held its event where Newport Center and Fashion Island now sit. It was the first jamboree held west of the Mississippi River and had 50,000 scouts from all 48 states, Alaska, Hawaii and 16 foreign countries. Thousands of tents were pitched in the area reachable only by a two-lane muddy trail called Palisades Road. The road was soon paved, and later the name was changed to Jamboree Road in honor of the Scouts.

In 1955, the Newport Harbor Buffalo Ranch was established. This tourist attraction featured a head of buffalo in addition to other 1950s-style 'cowboys and Indians' exhibits. Among other things, the attraction was notable for having a number Native Americans among its staff, including one of Geronimo's grandchildren, Chief Cuthle Geronimo III.

In 1958, Hughes Aircraft Company's Solid State Products Division, and Microelectronic Circuits Division, specializing in electronic testing, and assembly of hybrid components and administrative activities, was built in Newport Beach. Throughout the years, various use permit approvals were granted for the expansion of the site. In 1997, Raytheon Company merged with Hughes, and subsequently acquired the site. Raytheon continued the established operations. Raytheon sold the site in 2000.

In 1962, Pacific Electric trains along the Pacific Ocean were used for the last time to deliver boats to Newport Beach.

In 1963, the first phase of Eastbluff, the first "community" to be developed under the Irvine Company's master plan, was opened.

In 1967, Fashion Island was completed. Newport Center Drive, a circular road, embraces Fashion Island and gives it the "island" name. Newport Center's first office building, at 400 Newport Center Drive, was completed the same year.

In 1969, the Irvine Company's twin towers were completed at Newport Center.

In 1971, Harbor View Hills, the second Irvine Company village to be built in Newport Beach, was opened. It includes the area between MacArthur, Ford and San Miguel roads, and the area now known as Spyglass Hill. The Big Canyon Golf Club opens the same year. The first of three eight-story glass towers that make up the Newport Medical Complex is completed.

In 1972, architect William Pereira's famous "flying saucer" building, as well as Skidmore, Owings and Merrill's 18-story high-rise (the city's tallest to date), are both completed at Newport Center.

In 1973, the private community of Big Canyon was opened. Destined originally to be a landfill, Newport Beach real estate broker Marion Buie was an early advocate of the development. The original developers were Richard B. Smith, McClain Development, Deane Development Company and Broadmoor Homes.

In 1990, construction began on Newport Coast.
