= Ackerman Boat Company =

Shipyard in Newport Beach, California, United States

Coordinates: 33.612506°N 117.926300°W

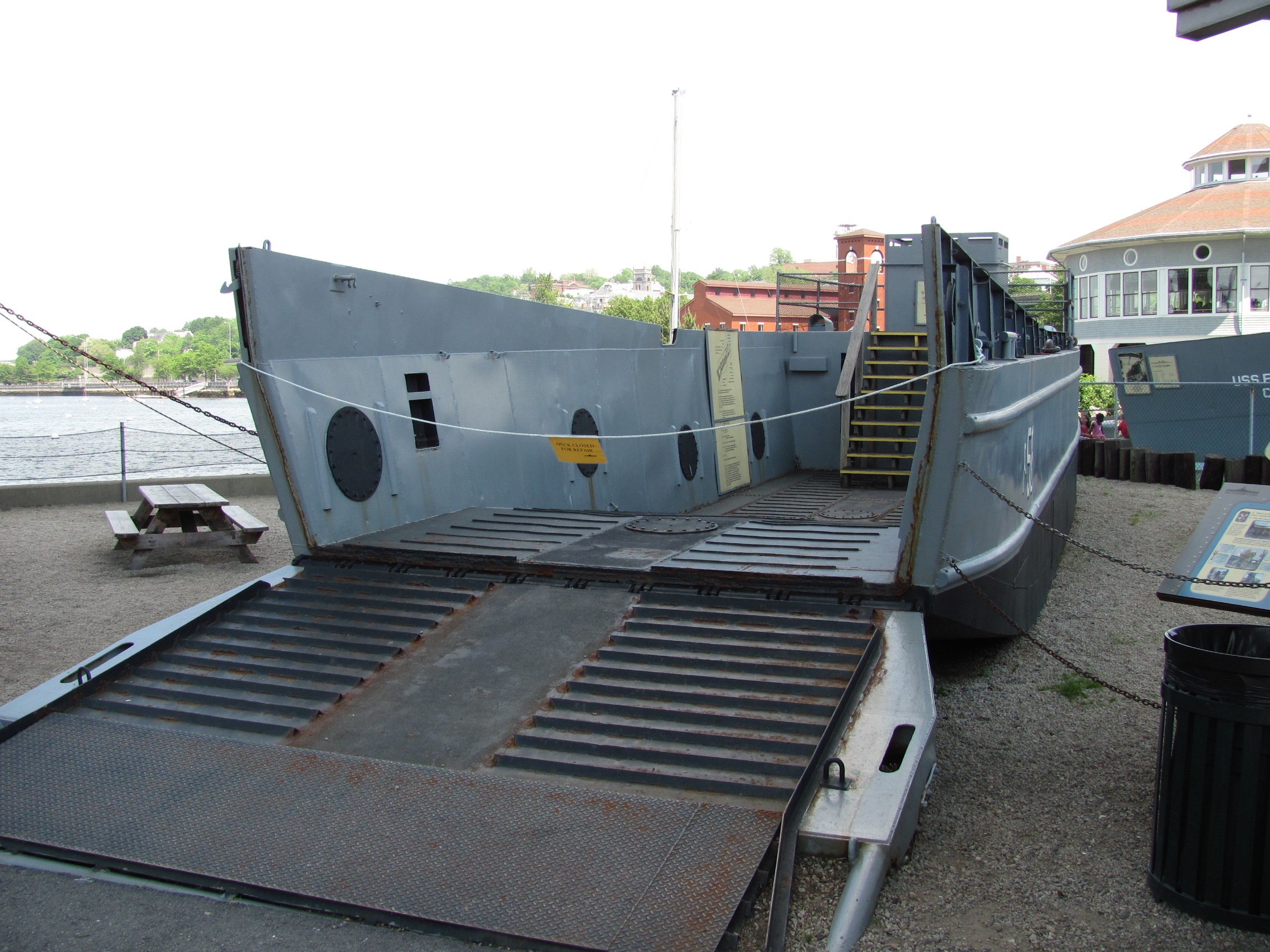
Landing Craft Mechanized LCM-3 at Battleship Cove, in Fall River, Massachusetts

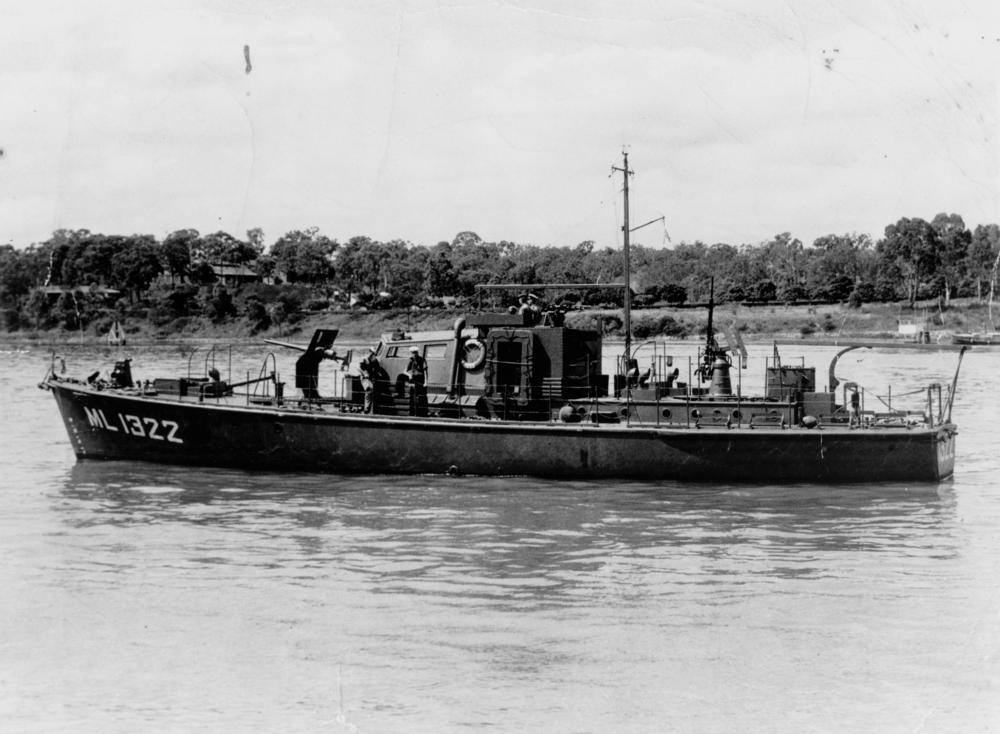
HDML, Harbour Defence Motor Launch with Royal Australian Navy in Brisbane in 1944

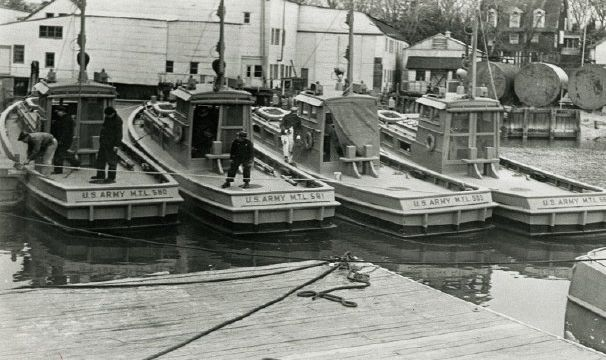
US Army Motor Towing Launch (MTL) Tugs in 1944

Ackerman Boat Company was a wooden shipbuilding company in Newport Beach, California. Ackerman Boat Company built small barges in Newport Harbor working with Star D Iron Works, in Santa Ana. To support the World War 2 demand for ships Ackerman Boat Company shipyard switched over to military construction and built: US Army Harbor Tugboats and US Navy Landing Craft Mechanized Model LCM Mark 3. Clarence Ackerman started the Ackerman Boat Company was in 1943. Ackerman Boat Company worked with Consolidated Steel's Wilmington shipyard to build the Tugboat and Landing Craft. Near the end of the war, Ackerman sold the yard to Consolidated Steel but purchased it back in 1947. Ackerman sold the shipyard in 1958. The shipyard was at 151 Shipyard Way, Newport Beach on the Lido Peninsula at the corner of Rhine Place. The current site has been the Newport Harbor Shipyard since 1981, which repairs and restoration of yachts.

== Notable ships ==
- Four HDML, Harbour Defence Motor Launch, Motor Launch that had a displacement of 46 tons, a length of 72-feet, crew of 10 men. Armed with one 3 or 4-pounder gun and four .303 AA guns. Had a top speed of 11 knots with a Diesel engine with 300 to 480 HP.
- Small US Army MTL Harbor Tugboats, 14 model 324-A with a length of 47 feet, a beam of 12 feet. MTL is for Motor Towing Launch.
- Landing Craft Mechanized Mark 3, LCM (3) with a displacement of 52 tons full, 23 tons light. LCM Mark 3 are a length of 50 feet (15 m), a beam of 14 feet (4.3 m), a draft of 3 feet (0.91 m) (forward); 4 feet (1.2 m) (aft). LCM(3) as a top speed of 8 knots (9.2 mph) full and 11 knots (13 mph) lite. Armed with two .50-cal M2 Browning machine guns, manned by a crew of 4. The cargo hold has a max capacity of one 30-ton tank (e.g. M4 Sherman) or 60 troops, or 60,000 lb (27,000 kg) of cargo.
- US Army TP Harbor Tug with displacement 185 tons gross, a length of 96 feet, a beam 25 feet, a draft of 11 feet, Power one Fairbanks–Morse six cylinder diesel engine to a single propeller with 450 shp. The TP Hull classification symbol is for "Tug/Passenger". The US Army had 43 of this 96-foot tugs built for World War 2, Ackerman Boat Company built 15 of them.

== Ackerman Boat Company ==
Ackerman Boat Company boats built in 1943 and 1944:

Ship ID	Name	Owner	Type	Length - Feet	Delivered	Notes
284507	MTL 1232	US Army	Harbor Tug	47	1943	Sold and renamed Lohilani
255210	MTL 1233	US Army	Harbor Tug	47	1943	Sold and renamed Kolomona
261139	MTL 1234	US Army	Harbor Tug	47	1943	Sold and renamed Ehukai, Little Toot, now Claire
	MTL 1235	US Army	Harbor Tug	47	1943	
250689	MTL 1236	US Army	Harbor Tug	47	1943	Sold and renamed Wanda K
	MTL 1237	US Army	Harbor Tug	47	1943	
	LCM(3)	US Navy	Lndg. Craft	53	1943	Quantity built not known
	HDML 1348	US Navy	Launch	72	1943	To New Zealand
	HDML 1349	US Navy	Launch	72	1943	To New Zealand
	HDML 1350	US Navy	Launch	72	1943	To New Zealand
	HDML 1351	US Navy	Launch	72	1943	To New Zealand
260751	TP 107	US Army	Harbor Tug	96	1944	Sold and renamed Daring, Anna Gore, Seaspan Daring
	TP 108	US Army	Harbor Tug	96	1944	
	TP 109	US Army	Harbor Tug	96	1944	
	TP 110	US Army	Harbor Tug	96	1944	
	TP 111	US Army	Harbor Tug	96	1944	renamed to Tartar, Bill Clark, Pacific Explorer
	TP 112	US Army	Harbor Tug	96	1944	
	TP 113	US Army	Harbor Tug	96	1944	
	TP 114	US Army	Harbor Tug	96	1944	
	TP 115	US Army	Harbor Tug	96	1944	
	TP 116	US Army	Harbor Tug	96	1944	
	TP 117	US Army	Harbor Tug	96	1944	
	TP 118	US Army	Harbor Tug	96	1944	Renamed to Pacific, Edith Foss, Mavis Lynn
	TP 119	US Army	Harbor Tug	96	1944	
	TP 120	US Army	Harbor Tug	96	1944	
	TP 121	US Army	Harbor Tug	96	1944	
245601	MTL ?	US Army	Harbor Tug	47	1944	Sold and renamed Nyna Rose
245892	MTL ?	US Army	Harbor Tug	47	1944	Sold and renamed New Home
245994	MTL	US Army	Harbor Tug	47	1944	Sold and renamed Thelma Kay
246519	MTL	US Army	Harbor Tug	47	1944	Sold and renamed Two Nancies
246806	MTL	US Army	Harbor Tug	47	1944	Sold and renamed Norman H
286909	MTL	US Army	Harbor Tug	47	1944	Sold and renamed H F Lauritzen
289913	MTL	US Army	Harbor Tug	47	1943	Sold and renamed Tug 1061, now Viking
557968	MTL	US Army	Harbor Tug	47	1944	Sold and renamed Dixie Diver
270852	TP	US Army	Harbor Tug	90	1944	Sold and renamed Tiger-Horse

== Consolidated Steel ==
Consolidated Steel boats with Consolidated Steel hull #, built in 1945 and 1946:

Hull #	Ship ID	Name	Owner	Type	Tons	Feet	Delivered	Notes
1320	248085	Edward J. Engel	Atchison Topeka RR	Tug	386	141	May-45	renamed to Respect, sank in Oakland in 2007
1347	248441	Princess Pat	Otto C. Kiessig	Trawler	238	90	Jul-45	
1348	249580	Lou Jean	Luigi Guidi	Trawler	260	90	1945	
1349	250247	Sport Fisher IV	Otto C. Kiessig	Passenger	63	61	1946	
1350	251893	Sport Fisher VI	Otto C. Kiessig	Passenger	14	43	1946	
1351	249889	Fatima	Cosimo Cutri	Trawler	251	90	1946	renamed to Sun Padre
1518	251344	American Boy	Joaquim Canas	Tuna Boat	360	116	Dec 1946	Foundered in 1966
1519	251696	Conte di Savoia		Tuna Boat	363	116	Dec 1946	renamed to Emperador Azteca in 1961

== Ackerman Boat Company ==
Ackerman Boat Company built from 1944 to 1957:

Ship ID	Name	Owner	Type	Tons	Feet	Delivered	Notes
246054	Blanch Leo	Claude C. Withers	Fishing	18	39	1944	
246110	Endeavor	Joseph Randazzo	Fishing	44	57	1944	
246873	Island Girl	C. E. Ackerman	Yacht	20	38	1944	
247282	Clara Marie	Giuseppe Mangiapane	Fishing	73	57	1945	
247499	La Belle	William B. Crofton	Fishing	73	57	1945	
248036	Rose Ann	Tony Tarantino	Fishing	73	57	1945	
248103	Offshore	Frank J. Hall	Passenger	14	42	1945	
248310	Trojan	Sam C. Meserve	Fishing	42	51	1945	
248370	Joann Marie	Pietro Sanfilippo	Fishing	37	51	1945	
248548	U.S. Republic	George V. Castagnola	Fishing	38	50	1945	
248782	Zootzine II	Keith F. Rima	Fishing	25	50	1945	
249608	Skip-Along	Walter E. Pruessing	Passenger	14	39	1946	
249975	San Michele	Erwin A. Pierson	Fishing	11	36	1946	
250018	Kathie Jane	Ralph F. Osterode	Fishing	31	42	1946	
250020	Renown	Tom A. Zarkos	Fishing	14	39	1946	
251001	St. Rita	Donald Corona	Fishing	23	41	1946	
251779	Mary Ann		Fishing	109	68	1947	
252831	Loretta Marie		Fishing	25	41	1947	
253118	Alalunga		Passenger	86	61	1947	
254831	San Mateo		Fishing	14	43	1948	
255378	Wave Walker		Fishing	20	38	1948	
258073	Amada		Fishing	11	33	1949	
273754	Red's Rogue		Recreational	15	35	1957	
281616	Angelina		Recreational	17	37	1957	
289711	Madam		Recreational	15	35	1957	
290820	Against the Wind		Recreational	15	37	1956	
502197	Kaomi		Recreational	15	35	1956	
517337	Golden Wings		Recreational	19	40	1956	
522757	Miracle		Recreational	16	40	1957	
529865	Concubine		Recreational	15	35	1956	
532262	Owlheart		Recreational	15	35	1957	renamed Nokomis

== See also ==
- California during World War II
- Maritime history of California
- Peyton Company
- South Coast Shipyard
- Victory Shipbuilding
- Wooden boats of World War 2
