= Victory Shipbuilding =

Shipyard in Newport Beach, California, United States

Coordinates: 33.616124°N 117.910989°W

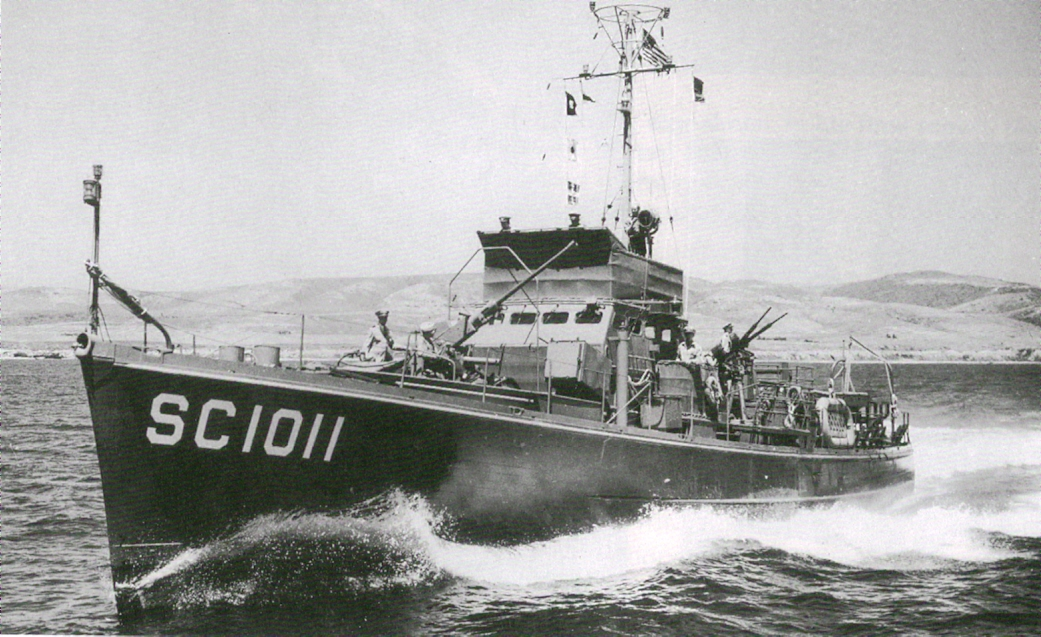
A US Navy 110-foot (34 m) submarine chaser in July 1943.

Victory Shipbuilding was the name of two shipbuilding companies that built vessels during World War 2. The first was the Victory Shipbuilding Company, of Holland, Michigan, and the second was the Victory Shipbuilding Corporation, of Newport Beach, California.

== Victory Shipbuilding Co. ==
This company was established in Wilmette, Illinois and received an order for two wooden Sub chasers (PC-1063 and PC-1064), on April 30, 1942. The company's president was Irwin A. Bleetz, and leased the Jessick Brothers boatyard, at Macatawa Park, Holland, Michigan. The first Subchaser was launched on November 28, 1942. In November 1942, the U.S. Navy ordered four wooden Tugboats (YT-302 to YT-305), which were completed in mid-1943.

== Victory Shipbuilding Corp. ==
This company was incorporated in October 1942, by Ray V. Marshall, and the boatyard was located at 615 Coast Highway, Newport Beach, California. The company received three contracts, one for the US Navy for six wooden Tugboats (YT-306 to YT-311), in November 1942; and two for the US Army for ten wooden Towboats (MTL-1222 to MTL-1231) and twenty wooden Mine Yawls ( MT-1338 to MT-1357), respectively in early and December 1943. All these boats were completed between the end of 1943 and mid-1944. After World War 2, the shipyard closed.

== Submarine chaser ==
Victory Shipbuilding Company built two submarine chasers that were of the SC-497-class submarine chaser design that had a displacement of 94 tons with a length of 110 feet (34 m), a beam of 17 feet (5.2 m), a draft of 6 feet (1.8 m), a top speed of 21 knots (39 km/h; 24 mph). They had a crew of 28. Power was provided by two 1,540-brake-horsepower (1,150 kW) General Motors, Electro-Motive Division, 16-184A diesel engines, and two propellers. They were armed with one Bofors 40 mm gun, two Browning M2 .50 cal. machine guns, two depth charge projector "Y guns", and two depth charge tracks.

- SC-1063 – Commissioned on February 13, 1943. The vessel was part of the Battle of the Atlantic. Decommissioned in October 1945. Transferred to the US Coast Guard as Air Skimmer (WAVR-463). In 1951 became the fishing vessel Perry B and Continental in 1972.
- SC-1064 – Commissioned USS SC-1064 on May 4, 1943. Transferred to the US Coast Guard on October 30, 1945 as USCGC Air Skylark (WAVR-464). Sold to Haiti as patrol boat Toussaint Louverture, 1947.

== Tugboats ==
the two Victory Shipbuilding built small harbor tugboats for the US Navy in 1943 and 1944. The tugs had a length of 63 feet (19 m), a depth of 8.3 feet (2.5 m), a beam of 17.8 feet (5.4 m), and measured 56 gross register tons (GRT) and 23 net register tons (NRT). The tugs were numbered YT-302 to YT-311, and reclassified YTL-302/311, in May 15, 1944; YT was the hull classification symbol for Harbor Tug, YTL for Harbor Tug, Little.

Victory Shipbuilding Corp built, for US Army, six 47 feet (14 m) and four 46 feet (14 m) Towboats numbered from MTL-1222 to MTL-1231. MTL was the hull classification symbol for Motor Launch Tugs. The last contract, for Army, was for 26 feet (7.9 m) Mine Yawls, numbered from MT-1338 to MT-1357.

== See also ==
- California during World War II
- Maritime history of California
- Ackerman Boat Company
- South Coast Shipyard
- Peyton Company
