= USS McMinnville =

Minesweeper of the United States Navy

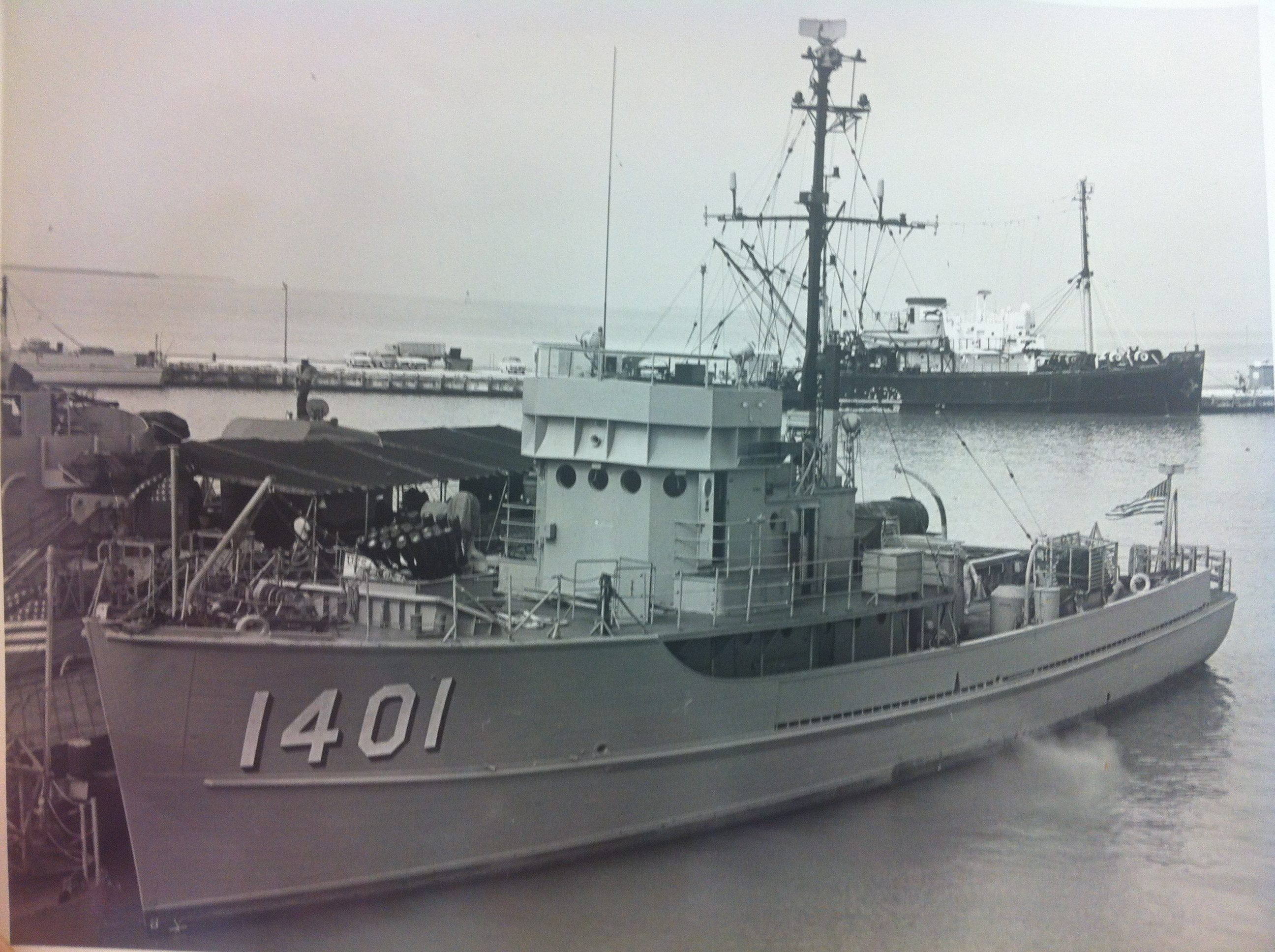
- Docked @ Naval Station Key West

History

United States
- Name: USS PCS-1401
- Builder: South Coast Co.; Newport Beach, California
- Laid down: 3 March 1944 as YMS-452
- Reclassified: PCS-1401, 23 June 1944
- Launched: 22 July 1944
- Commissioned: 21 February 1945
- Decommissioned: 1 June 1955
- In service: 1 June 1955
- Home port: Chattanooga, Tennessee
- Renamed: McMinnville, 15 February 1956
- Namesake: Towns in Oregon and Tennessee
- Stricken: 1 August 1962
- Fate: Sold, 28 May 1963

General characteristics
- Class & type: PCS-1376-class minesweeper
- Displacement: 251 tons (lt.)
- Length: 136 ft (41 m)
- Beam: 24 ft 6 in (7.47 m)
- Draft: 10 ft (3.0 m)
- Speed: 14 knots (26 km/h)
- Complement: 57
- Armament: 1 × 3"/50 caliber dual purpose gun mount; 2 × 20 mm guns; 1 × depth charge track

USS McMinnville (PCS-1401) was a PCS-1376-class minesweeper built for the United States Navy during World War II. Originally known only by her designation, as USS PCS-1401, she was renamed later in her career after towns in Oregon and Tennessee, and is the only U.S. Navy ship to have been named McMinnville.

== History ==
McMinnville was laid down as YMS-452 by South Coast Co. of Newport Beach, California on 3 March 1944. She was redesignated PCS-1401 on 23 June 1944; launched 22 July 1944; and commissioned at Newport Beach 21 February 1945.

After shakedown training out of San Diego, California, PCS-1401 reported for duty with the West Coast Sound Training Squadron at San Diego 25 March 1945. During the closing months of World War II she operated off southern California training men in antisubmarine warfare sonar techniques. She had similar duty out of San Diego over the next decade, joining Service Squadron 1 in November 1954.

On 31 March 1955 she left San Diego for Panama, New Orleans, Louisiana, and Chattanooga, Tennessee, where she decommissioned 1 June 1955, was placed in an "in service" status, and began training naval reservists of the Chattanooga area.

Renamed McMinnville on 15 February 1956, she continued service in maintaining reserve readiness until struck from the Naval Vessel Register on 1 August 1962. She was sold to Marine Exploration Co. of Miami, Florida on 28 May 1963.
