= Peyton Company =

Shipyard in Newport Beach, California, United States

Coordinates: 33.613271°N 117.891901°W

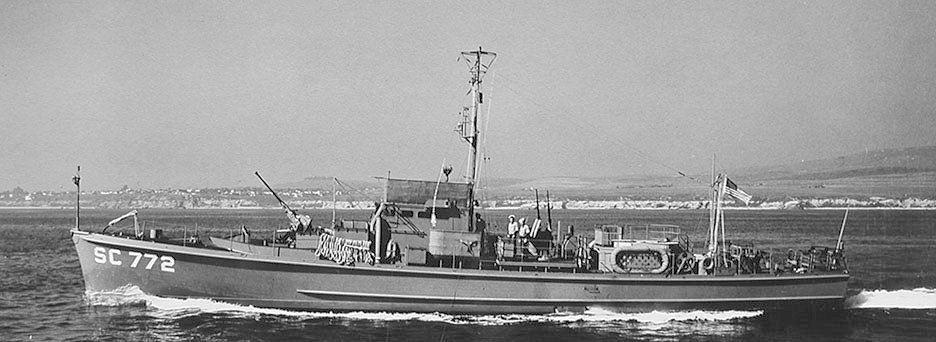
USS SC-772 Sub Chaser, built by Peyton Company in 1943

The Peyton Company, also called Peyton Marine Service and Supplies, was a wooden shipbuilding and dry dock company in Newport Beach, California.

The shipyard was started by J. W. Peyton (1875-?), born in Texas, and his wife Anabel Peyton (1886-?). The shipyard was later owned by his sons, C. R. Peyton (1911-?) and R. P. Peyton (1919-?), a naval architect. The Peyton Company purchased the shipyard from the Balboa Marina Hardware Company, owned by Westin T. Jay.

The Peyton Company built civilian boats, yachts and fishing boats, in Newport Harbor. To support the World War II demand for ships, the Peyton Company shipyard switched over to military construction and built Army harbor tugboats and Navy sub chasers. The Peyton Company leased Newport Harbor waterfront land to build these ships. After the war, in 1945 the shipyard closed, partly due to the two deaths in the family. The shipyard office was at 901 Pacific Coast Hwy, Newport Beach.

== Notable ships ==
- US Navy submarine chaser that had a displacement of 148 tons, a length of 110 feet, a beam 17 feet, a draft of 6 feet top speed of 21 knots. A crew of 28. Armed with: one 40mm gun, two .50 cal. machine guns, two depth charge projector "K Gun," and two depth charge tracks. Powered with two 1,540bhp General Motors (Electro-Motive Div.) 16-184A diesel engines to two shafts.
- US Army TP harbor tug with displacement 185 tons gross, a length of 97 feet, a beam 25 feet, a draft of 11 feet, Power one Fairbanks–Morse six cylinder diesel engine to a single propeller with 450 shp. The TP is for "Tug/Passenger". The US Army had 43 of this 96-foot tugs built for World War II, Peyton Company built 4 of them.

| Ship ID | Original name | Original owner | Ship type | Tons | Length (feet) | Delivered | Notes |
|---|---|---|---|---|---|---|---|
| | SC 772 | US Navy | Sub chaser | 95d | 110 | 15-April-1943 | To USCG 1945 renamed to Air Mallard (WAVR 437), sold 1948 renamed to Lady Goodiver, now B-and-B SC-772 (Canada) |
| 261514 | SC 773 | US Navy | Sub chaser | 95d | 110 | 12-May-1943 | Sold 1948 renamed to Larry |
| | SC 774 | US Navy | Sub chaser | 95d | 110 | 28-June-43 | To the USSR 1945 renamed to BO-323 |
| 258943 | SC 775 | US Navy | Sub chaser | 95d | 110 | 30-July-1943 | To USCG 1945 renamed to Air Martin (WAVR 438), sold 1948 renamed to Milmar |
| | SC 1362 | US Navy | Sub chaser | 95d | 110 | 6-Sep-1943 | To USCG 1945 renamed to Air Warbler (WAVR 477), sold 1948 renamed to Warbler |
| | SC 1363 | US Navy | Sub chaser | 95d | 110 | 29-Sep-1943 | Disposed of 1946 |
| | SC 1364 | US Navy | Sub chaser | 95d | 110 | 13-Nov-1943 | To the USSR 1945 renamed to BO-331 |
| | SC 1365 | US Navy | Sub chaser | 95d | 110 | 10-Jan-1944 | To the USSR 1945 renamed to BO-329 |
| | TP 122 | US Army | Tug, harbor | | 96 | July 1944 | |
| | TP 123 | US Army | Tug, harbor | | 96 | July 1944 | Worked in Alaskan waters in World War II. Sold and renamed to Outlaw V (Canada O.N. 320295) (New engine in 1960 and 2011) |
| | TP 124 | US Army | Tug, harbor | | 96 | August 1944 | |
| | TP 125 | US Army | Tug, harbor | | 96 | August 1944 | |

== See also ==
- California during World War II
- Maritime history of California
- Ackerman Boat Company
- South Coast Shipyard
- Victory Shipbuilding
- Wooden boats of World War 2
