= USS Simon Newcomb =

Minesweeper of the United States Navy

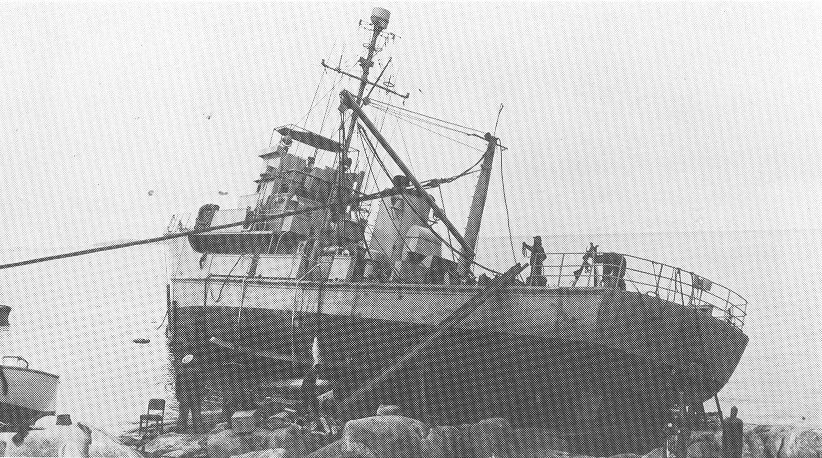

History

United States
- Name: Simon Newcomb
- Builder: South Coast Shipyard
- Laid down: 21 August 1942
- Launched: 2 November 1942
- Commissioned: 11 August 1943
- Decommissioned: 10 November 1949
- Stricken: 31 January 1950
- Identification: AGSC-14
- Fate: Scrapped, 25 April 1950

General characteristics
- Displacement: 340 tons
- Length: 136 ft (41 m)
- Beam: 23 ft 4 in (7.11 m)
- Draught: 8 ft 7 in (2.62 m)
- Propulsion: 2 x 1,000 bhp (750 kW) General Motors 8-268A diesel engines; Snow and Knobstedt single reduction gear, two shafts
- Speed: 14.1 knots (26.1 km/h; 16.2 mph)
- Complement: 60
- Armament: 1 x 3 in (76 mm) dual purpose gun mount; 2 x 20 mm (0.79 in) guns; 2 x depth charge throwers; 2 dcp

USS Simon Newcomb (AGSC-14/YMS-263) was a YMS-1-class minesweeper of the YMS-135 subclass acquired by the U.S. Navy during World War II, and whose task was assisting in minesweeping and surveying coastal waters.

== History ==
YMS-263 was laid down on 21 August 1942 by the South Coast Shipyard, Newport Beach, California and launched on 2 November 1942. The vessel was commissioned on 11 August 1943.

YMS-263 completed fitting out and shakedown in the San Diego, California, area from 15 October to 3 November. She then performed sweeping operations in Los Angeles Harbor until sailing for Kauai, Territory of Hawaii, on 5 January 1944. From Hawaii, the sweeper was ordered to the Marshall Islands to sweep during the amphibious assault on Kwajalein and Majuro Atolls from 31 January to 8 February. Majuro was the sweeper's main base during the next 11 months. From July to December, she made escort trips to Tarawa and Eniwetok. On 6 December 1944, she was ordered to return to San Pedro, California, via Johnston Island and Pearl Harbor.

The minesweeper arrived at San Pedro on 17 January and entered the yard of the Wilmington Boat Works for conversion to an amphibious hydrographic survey ship. On 20 March, YMS-263 was redesignated AGS-14 and named Simon Newcomb. On 21 April, she was ready for sea and departed for Majuro via Pearl Harbor and Johnston Island. Simon Newcomb called at Eniwetok on 1 June and proceeded to Guam, arriving there on 7 June. She operated from there for the next five months, performing hydrographic work; sometimes as far afield as Okinawa.

Simon Newcomb returned to the west coast on 25 December 1945 and was routed to Norfolk, Virginia, via the Panama Canal, arriving on 21 January 1946. From early February to 2 May, the survey ship operated with a hydrographic party off the Bahama Islands. On 29 July, she was redesignated as AGSC-14. After seven days at Boothbay, Maine, in November, Simon Newcomb moved south on 26 November and operated between Key West, Florida, Vera Cruz, Mexico, and New Orleans, Louisiana, until 10 April 1948 when she returned to Norfolk.

She operated in northern waters for the next eight months, plying between New York City, Argentia and Labrador. Simon Newcomb returned to Key West on 18 December 1948 and operated from there until 10 April 1949 when she resumed her northern station. On 9 August she ran hard aground at Mother Burns Cove, Labrador. She was refloated, patched up, and towed to Norfolk for disposal.

Simon Newcomb was decommissioned on 10 November 1949, struck from the Navy list on 31 January 1950, and sold to B. F. M. Industries, Brooklyn, New York, on 25 April for scrap.

== Awards and honors ==
Simon Newcomb received one battle star for World War II service.

== See also ==
- USS Newcomb (DD-586)
