= USS James M. Gilliss (AMCU-13) =

Minesweeper of the United States Navy

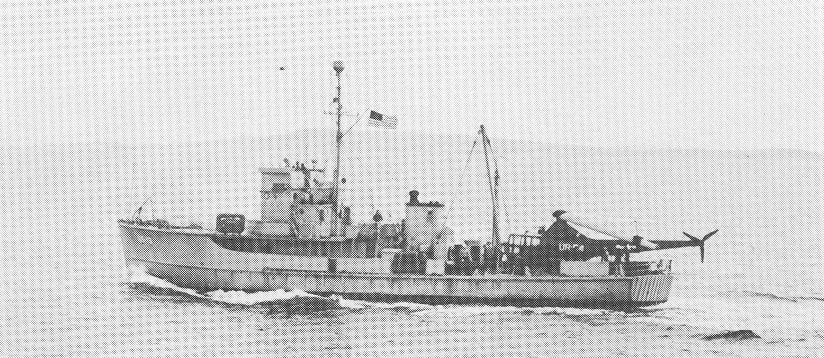

History

United States
- Namesake: James Melville Gilliss, founder of the US Naval Observatory
- Ordered: as YMS-262
- Builder: South Coast Shipyard
- Laid down: 6 September 1942
- Launched: 24 December 1942
- Commissioned: 15 September 1943
- Decommissioned: 22 September 1950
- In service: 5 September 1951
- Out of service: 6 August 1958
- Stricken: 1 January 1960
- Fate: Sold, 17 June 1960

General characteristics
- Displacement: 265 tons
- Length: 186 ft (57 m)
- Beam: 23 ft 4 in (7.11 m)
- Draught: 8 ft 7 in (2.62 m)
- Speed: 14 knots
- Complement: 60
- Armament: one 3 in (76 mm) gun mount, two 20 mm machine guns, two depth charge racks, two depth charge tracks

USS James M. Gilliss (AMCU-13/YMS-262) was a YMS-1-class minesweeper of the YMS-135 subclass named after James Melville Gilliss, a US naval officer credited with establishing the US Naval Observatory.

== Operational history ==
YMS-262 was laid down by the South Coast Shipyard, Newport Beach, California, 6 September 1942; launched 24 December 1942; and commissioned 15 September 1943.

=== World War II service ===
After shakedown off the coast of California, YMS-262 conducted minesweeping exercises out of San Pedro, California, during the remainder of the year. Departing San Diego 5 January 1944, she reached Nawiliwili Harbor, Hawaii, 17 January and there joined units of Rear Admiral Richard L. Conolly’s Northern Attack Force staging for the invasion of Kwajalein, Marshalls. She sailed the 19th and closed the enemy-held atoll 31 January. Prior to initial landings off Roi-Namur, she swept a path for amphibious ships into the lagoon; then she screened LST's during afternoon landings. From 1 to 9 February she operated off Roi-Namur, sweeping for mines, and carrying out hydrographic and pilotage duties.

==== Supporting the invasion of Kwajalein ====
Steaming to Kwajalein Island 12 February, YMS-262 joined Rear Admiral H. W. Hill's Eniwetok Expeditionary Group and sortied from Kwajalein Lagoon 15 February for the invasion of that strategic atoll. The assault force approached Eniwetok 17 February, and YMS-262 swept the Wide Passage and lagoon for mines as the force prepared for initial landings on the northern islets off Engebi. During the remainder of the month she performed minesweeping, screening, and control duties as powerful American naval and ground forces wiped out Japanese resistance on Engebi, Eniwetok, and Parry Islands.

==== End-of-war operations ====
YMS-262 served at Eniwetok during mop-up operations in the Marshalls; and she remained in the Marshalls until December when she returned to the United States. From January to April 1945 she was converted to a surveying ship at California Shipbuilding Corp., Wilmington, California. On 23 March she was named James M. Gilliss and reclassified AGS-13. She steamed to Pearl Harbor in April and sailed for the Marianas the following month. Arriving Guam early in June, she underwent survey training before sailing for Okinawa late in July. She steamed via Saipan and reached Okinawa as Japanese forces in the Pacific surrendered.

=== Supporting Bikini Atoll nuclear testing ===
James M. Gilliss served at Okinawa until November; and, following destructive typhoons in September and October, she provided important survey work off the battered island. She sailed for Japan 1 November and for the next month supported occupation operations out of Nagoya. Departing Nagoya 4 December, she reached Pearl Harbor 6 January 1946. After overhaul, she sailed for the Marshalls in March to support Operation Crossroads, the atomic bomb tests. Arriving Bikini Atoll 16 March, for the next 5 months she operated between Bikini and Eniwetok while conducting hydrographic, oceanographic, and other scientific surveys.

Reclassified AGSC-13 on 29 July, James M. Gilliss departed Bikini 19 August. Steaming via Pearl Harbor, she reached San Francisco, California, 30 September. Assigned to duty with the U.S. Atlantic Fleet, she departed San Francisco 23 November and arrived Norfolk, Virginia, 23 December. From March 1947 to May 1950 she operated from the North Atlantic to the Caribbean, and she participated in coastal surveys off Newfoundland, Mexico, Cuba, and Trinidad. Arriving New York 12 May 1950, she decommissioned 22 September and entered the Atlantic Reserve Fleet.

=== Converted to minehunter ===
Converted to a minehunter, James M. Gilliss reclassified AMc(U)-13 on 18 August 1951 and recommissioned 5 September 1951. Assigned to the Atlantic Mine Fleet 18 February 1952, she operated out of New York City until 20 March 1953 when she was assigned to the Mine Hunting Unit at Little Creek, Virginia. From 1953 to 1958 she operated primarily in Chesapeake Bay, conducting training exercises and testing and evaluating precise navigation equipment. In addition she operated along the Atlantic Coast from Massachusetts to North Carolina, and during November and December 1956 she trained in the Caribbean out of Guantanamo Bay, Cuba.

Reclassified MHC-13 on 1 February 1955, she operated out of Little Creek until June 1958 when she steamed to Green Cove Springs, Florida. She decommissioned there 6 August 1958 and entered the Atlantic Reserve Fleet. She was struck from the Navy List 1 January 1960, and sold to Marlene Blouse Corp. by 17 June.

== Awards and honors ==
YMS-262 received one battle star for World War II service.
