= James Melville Gilliss =

American astronomer (1811–1865)

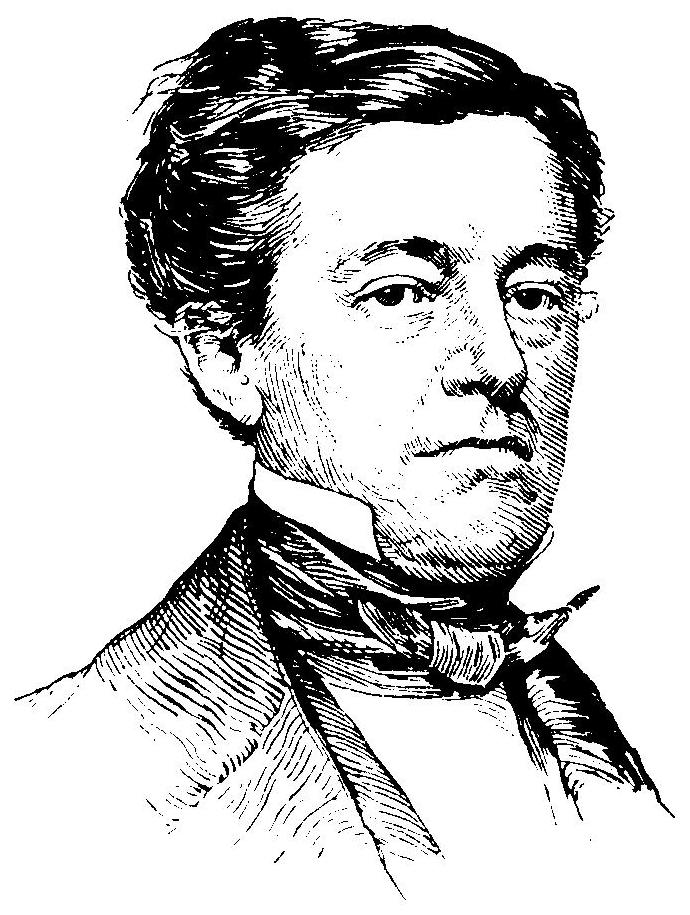
- Born: September 6, 1811; Georgetown, Washington, D.C., U.S.
- Died: February 9, 1865 (aged 53); Washington, D.C., U.S.
- Resting place: Oak Hill Cemetery; Washington, D.C., U.S.
- Known for: United States Naval Observatory
- Scientific career
- Fields: astronomy

James Melville Gilliss (September 6, 1811 – February 9, 1865) was an astronomer, United States naval officer and founder of the United States Naval Observatory.

== Biography ==
Gilliss was born on September 6, 1811, in Georgetown, District of Columbia. His parents were George Gilliss, a federal employee, and Mary (Melville) Gillis. In 1827, at age fifteen, he joined the United States Navy as a midshipman. He made several training cruises on the Delaware, the Java, and the Concord. In 1833, he passed his examinations and was advanced to passed midshipman.

In 1833, Gilliss requested a leave of absence and began his studies at the University of Virginia. Poor health forced him to leave after six months. He went to Paris for further studies in 1835 and was recalled to Washington to serve as an assistant at the Depot of Charts and Instruments in 1836. In late 1837, he married Rebecca Roberts of Alexandria, D.C.

The Depot of Charts and Instruments was headed by Charles Wilkes. The depot was responsible for the navy's chronometers, charts, and other navigational instruments and provided Gilliss with an opportunity to practice astronomy. Astronomical observations were necessary to determine the accuracy of the Navy's chronometers. Gilliss proved himself to be an excellent astronomical observer. In 1837, he was named officer-in-charge of the depot and began an extensive series of observations of the moon and stars for the purpose of longitude determination. In February 1838 he was promoted to lieutenant.

In 1838, Wilkes left the depot to lead the U.S. Exploring Expedition and Gilliss replaced him as head of the organization. Gilliss began a series of celestial observations that were published in 1846 as Astronomical Observations made at the Naval Observatory, Washington. This reference listed some 1,248 stars and was the first star catalog published in the United States.

Gilliss is most noted for his successful efforts to establish the U.S. Naval Observatory, the first national observatory in the United States. In 1841, he first proposed a new depot and personally lobbied congress for the funds. In 1842, Congress passed an authorization for $25,000 for a new depot and "a small observatory". Gilliss used the funds to equip the new building with astronomical instruments, including a 9.6-inch achromatic refracting telescope, a 5.5-inch transit instrument, a 4-inch meridian circle, and a 5-inch prime vertical telescope. He traveled to Europe to purchase the necessary instruments and books and by October 1844 the observatory was ready. However, because of internal politics Gilliss was not appointed director; that position went instead to Matthew Fontaine Maury (the secretary of the navy was from Maury's home state, Virginia).

In 1848, he was elected to the American Philosophical Society.

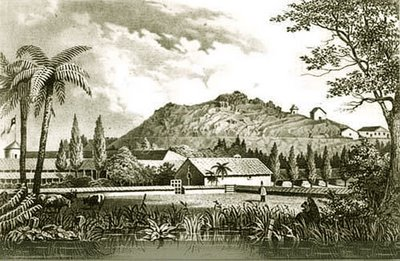
Santa Lucia Hill, site of Gilliss' observatory in Santiago, Chile.

Gilliss continued working at the observatory, completing publication of his celestial catalog and providing support to the Office of Coast Survey. In 1848, he obtained $5,000 from Congress for a naval astronomical expedition to Chile in order to more precisely measure the solar parallax. Gilliss headed the expedition from August 1849 until his return in November 1852. In Chile the expedition enjoyed the support of the government, the University of Chile, the Military School plus a wide array of individuals. They successfully completed the planned astronomical observations and also made valuable observations of the Earth's magnetic field, earthquakes, geography, politics and natural science. The specimens of fauna and flora brought back from Chile formed the earliest part of the Smithsonian collection from Latin America. The wide-ranging results of the expedition were published in a six-volume treatise, the United States Astronomical Expedition to the Southern Hemisphere, published 1855–1896. The observatory and staff he left in Chile became the nucleus of Chile's astronomical program, previous to this there was no astronomical tradition in Chile. Under the direct influence of the expedition from 1850 onward the journal Anales de la Universidad de Chile begun to publish content on astronomy. Gilliss later led two expeditions to observe the solar eclipses in Peru in 1858 and Washington Territory in 1860.

At the onset of the Civil War, Maury resigned to join the Confederate Navy and Gilliss was placed in charge of the observatory in 1861. He also became a founding member of the National Academy of Sciences and was promoted to captain in July 1862. During his four-year tenure, Gilliss reduced the backlog of scientific work that had gone unpublished, encouraged the manufacture of American-made astronomical equipment, and worked closely with other American observatories. His organization also played a crucial role in providing charts and navigation instruments to the rapidly expanding Union navy.

Gilliss died unexpectedly on February 9, 1865. He had been looking forward to seeing his son who had just been released from a Confederate prisoner-of-war camp. That morning he collapsed and died from a stroke at the age of 53. He was buried at Oak Hill Cemetery in Washington, D.C.

== Published works ==
- Astronomical Observations made at the Naval Observatory, Washington (1846)
- The U.S. Naval Astronomical Expedition to the Southern Hemisphere during the Years 1849-50-51-52 (6 vols., Washington, 1855–95)
- An Account of the Total Eclipse of the Sun on September 7, 1858, as Observed near Olmos, Peru (Washington, 1859)
- An Account of the Total Solar Eclipse of July 18, 1860: as Observed for the United States Coast Survey near Steilacoom, Washington Territory (1861)

== Honors ==
The James Melville Gilliss Building in Washington, D.C., houses the offices of the Naval Observatory and the Oceanographer of the Navy. The library of the US Naval Observatory is also named in his honor and two US Navy ships were named for him:

- USS James M. Gilliss (AMCU-13), a minesweeper built in 1945.
- USNS James M. Gilliss (T-AGOR-4), an oceanographic research ship launched 1962.
