= USS Grosbeak (AMS-14) =

Minesweeper of the United States Navy

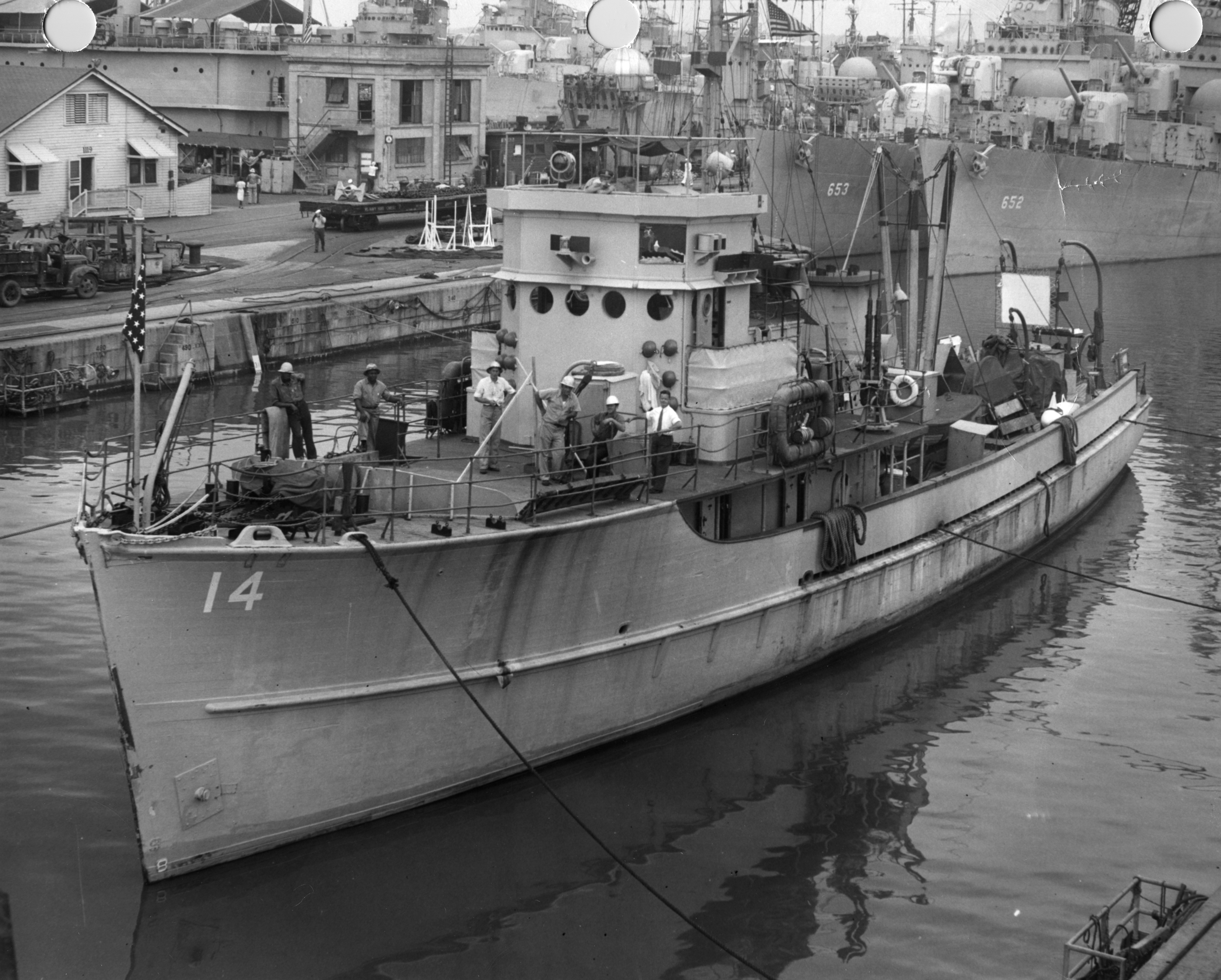

History

United States
- Ordered: as YMS-317
- Builder: South Coast Shipyard
- Laid down: date unknown
- Launched: 27 February 1943
- Commissioned: 18 November 1943
- Decommissioned: 7 December 1955
- Stricken: 1 November 1959
- Fate: approved for disposal, 27 October 1959

General characteristics
- Displacement: 270 tons
- Length: 136 ft (41 m)
- Beam: 25 ft (7.6 m)
- Draught: 8 ft (2.4 m)
- Speed: 15 knots
- Complement: 32
- Armament: one 3 in (76 mm) gun mount

USS Grosbeak (AMS-14/YMS-317) was a YMS-1-class minesweeper of the YMS-135 subclass built for the U.S. Navy during World War II.

== History ==
Grosbeak was launched as YMS-317, by the South Coast Shipyard, Newport Beach, California, on 27 February 1943; sponsored by Mrs. Marjorie Boutelle; and commissioned 18 November 1943.

After shakedown, YMS-317 swept the San Francisco Bay area until 3 May 1944, when she sailed for Pearl Harbor. In the Pacific Ocean, she acted as an escort vessel to convoys in back and staging areas, such as Eniwetok, Saipan, and Kwajalein, as well as patrolling and mine-sweeping in these areas.

After the war's end, YMS-317 returned to Pearl Harbor for a badly needed overhaul. She reached Charleston, South Carolina, via San Pedro, California, and the Panama Canal in June 1946 and again underwent overhaul. The ship was named Grosbeak and redesignated AMS-14 on 18 February 1947.

Grosbeak spent most of her post-war career at the Mine Warfare School, Yorktown, Virginia, and the Naval Minecraft Base at Charleston as a training ship. She also participated in various experiments at the Naval Mine Countermeasures Station, Panama City, Florida, and engaged in numerous exercises along the coast from New England to the Gulf of Mexico. From 24 February to 19 March 1950 Grosbeak was in the Caribbean to participate in Operation PORTREX out of Vieques Island, Puerto Rico, and in February 1951 she became the first of her type to journey from Yorktown to Charleston via the intracoastal waterway.

The minesweeper received the coveted Battle Efficiency "E" for outstanding performance in her class in 1950, 1951, and 1952, one of the few ships in the Navy to receive three such awards. When she was not engaged in sweeping exercises, Grosbeak underwent periodic overhauls at Charleston and also visited Miami, Florida, and New York City.

Scheduled for deactivation, Grosbeak sailed to Green Cove Springs, Florida, 16 November 1955 and was decommissioned there on 7 December 1955. The hulk was approved for disposal on 27 October 1959 and Grosbeak's name was struck from the Navy List on 1 November 1959.

== Awards and honors ==
- U.S. Navy Battle Efficiency Award, 1950, 1951, 1952
