= Lido Isle, Newport Beach =

Man-made island in Newport Beach Harbor

Lido Isle
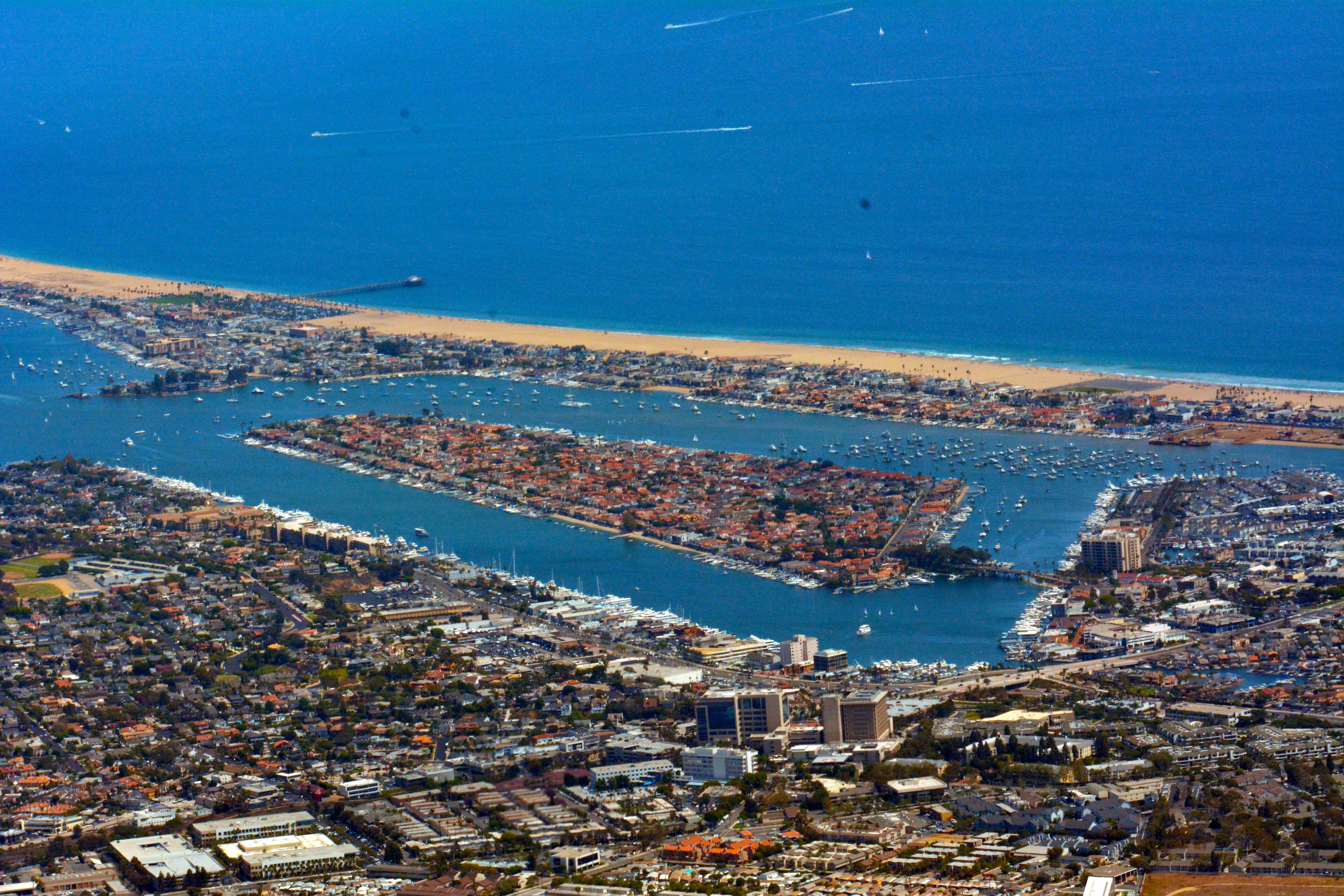

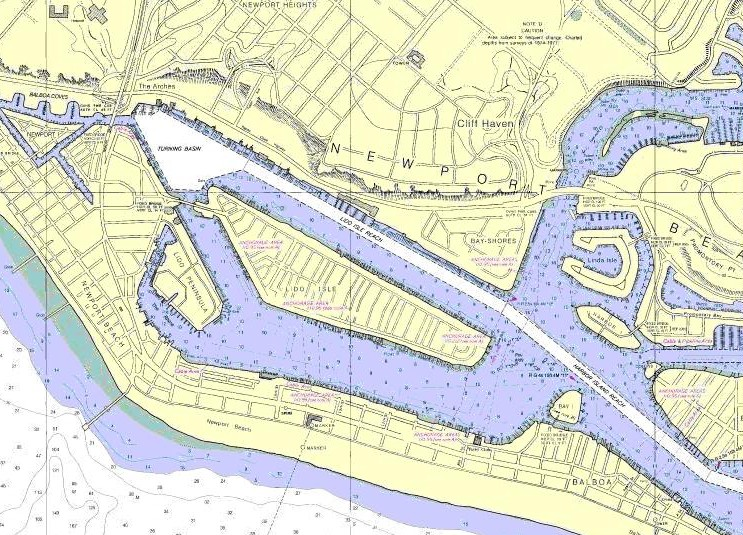
- Lido Isle, Newport Beach California

Geography
- Location: Newport Beach, California
- Coordinates: 33.6126°N 117.9168°W
- Area: 0.39 sq mi (1.0 km^{2})

Administration
- United States
- State: California
- County: Orange County
- City: Newport Beach

Demographics
- Population: 1,800 (2000)
- Pop. density: 4,600/sq mi (1780/km^{2})

Lido Isle (mistakenly Lido Island) is a man-made island located in the harbor of Newport Beach, California. Surrounded by the city, Lido Isle was incorporated as part of Newport Beach in 1906. At that time it was part sandbar and part mudflat. There are no commercial facilities on the island. Its only link to the city is a small bridge. The man-made island is solely residential with approximately 1,800 people living on the island.

== History ==
The name Lido originated from the Lido di Venezia. In 1904 Henry Huntington became a partner with William Collins in the Newport Beach Company. In exchange for extending the Pacific Electric Railway to Newport Beach, Huntington received 250 acres (1.0 km^{2}) and a 100-foot (30 m) wide right-of-way for the railway. A mudflat was included in addition to the other land given Huntington. This mudflat became known as Electric Island, Pacific Electric Island, and finally Huntington Island.

In 1923, Huntington Island was purchased from Pacific Electric by W. K. Parkinson for $45,000 (~$747,000 in 2022). Parkinson, a former conductor on the Pacific Electric, made his fortune from land investments when oil was discovered near Bakersfield. Parkinson spent more than a quarter-million dollars dredging the harbor and using the fill to raise the isle more than ten feet above the high tide line. The Griffith Company was hired to build seawalls, a bridge, piers and roads.

The new development was one of the first master planned communities in California and was conceived to resemble a European resort. Parkinson envisioned the space as a resort similar to those in the Mediterranean. After dredging the island was renamed Lido Isle in homage to Lido di Venezia near Venice.

== Geography ==
The island has one bridge providing access. The community was one of the first in Southern California to be built with underground utilities.

As part of its Mediterranean theme, the development's streets are named after many Mediterranean cities, including Barcelona, Genoa, Nice, and Ithaca. The names of the two main streets, Via Lido Nord and Via Lido Soud, also reflect this theme. The island has about 800 homes with about 250 on the water. Most are built in a Mediterranean Revival Style architecture, but there are some Cape Cod and modern style homes as well.

== Community ==
Burgee of the Lido Island Yacht Club

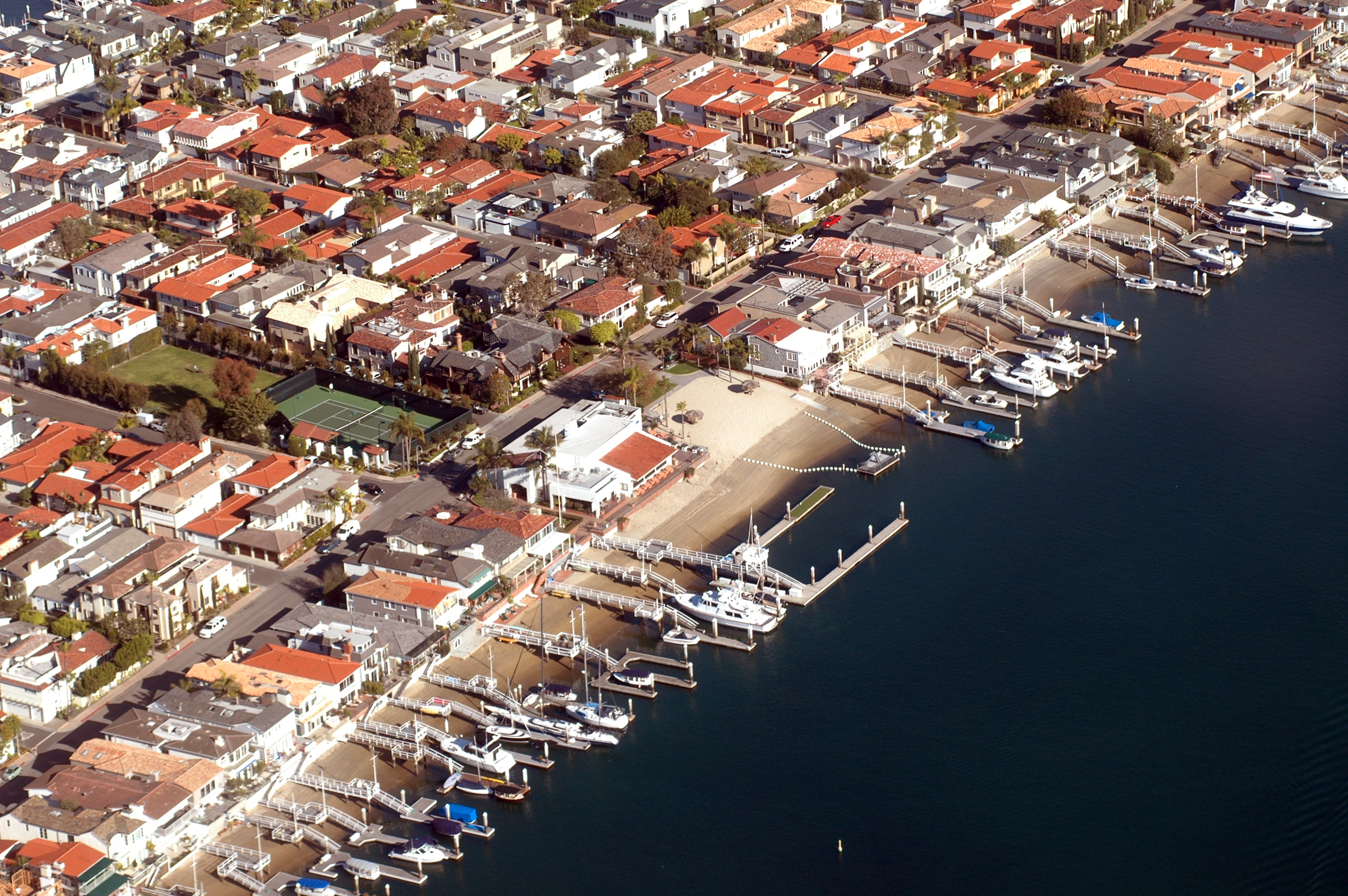
Lido Island Yacht Club, January 8, 2013

=== Lido Isle Club House ===
The geographic and social center of this "semi-private" community is the Lido Isle Clubhouse, which hosts many community clubs and organizations, including the Lido Isle Yacht Club, and includes a snack bar and bay beach. All property owners must pay an annual assessment, and all residents are Community Association members. The island plays a big part in the annual Newport Christmas Boat Parade.

=== Lido Isle Yacht Club ===
The Lido Isle Yacht Club was founded in 1928, though it did not fully organize until 1947. The club’s burgee is a combination of the white burgee with red St. George’s Cross of the Royal Yacht Squadron and blue fouled anchor of the South Coast Corinthian Yacht Club. Its mission has been to educate young sailors and provide activities to the people of Lido Isle. The Southern California Yachting Association granted membership to the club in 1948, and it was admitted to the Yacht Racing Union of Southern California in 1965.

== Gallery ==
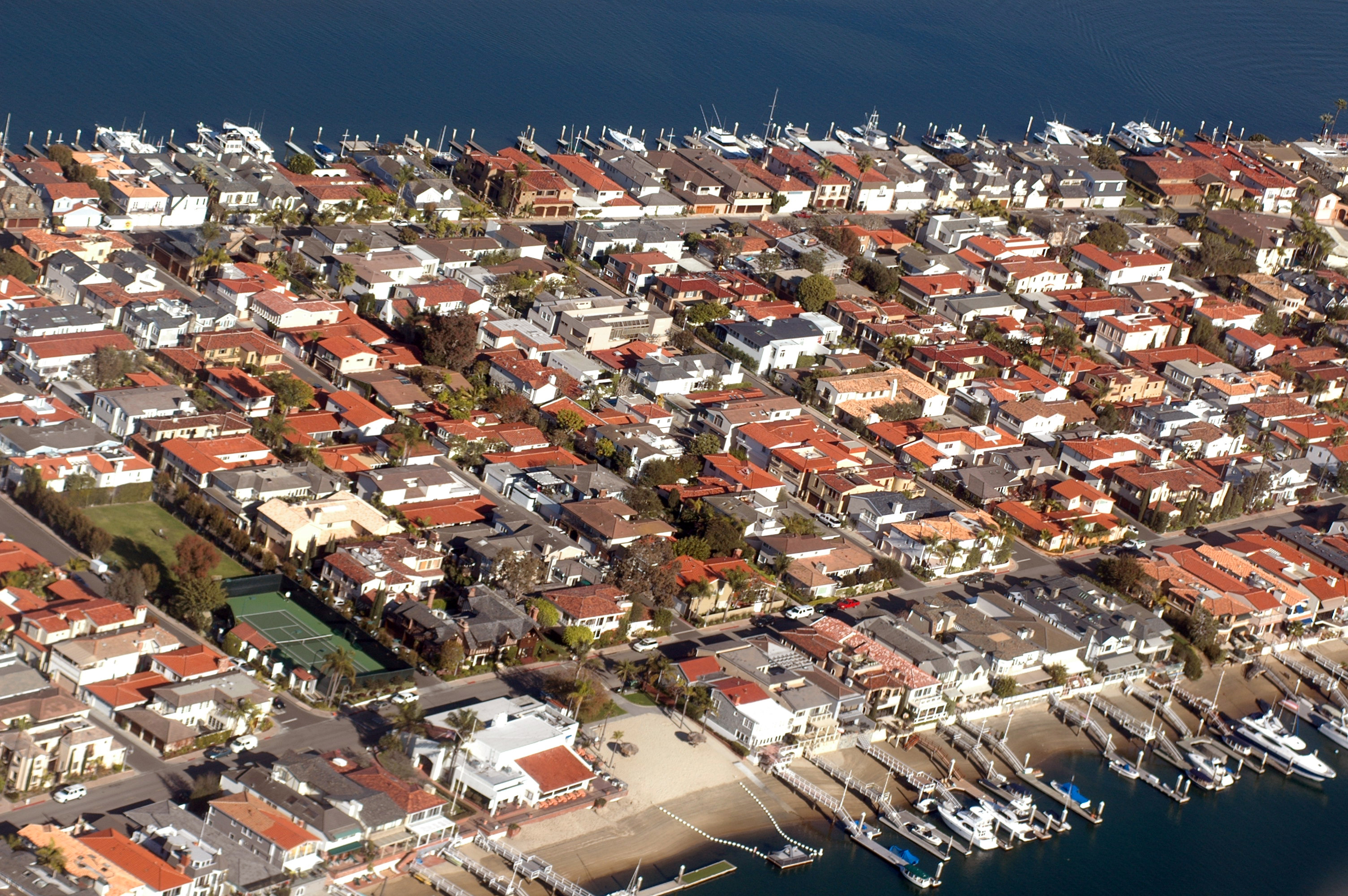
Lido Isle cross section, Newport Beach

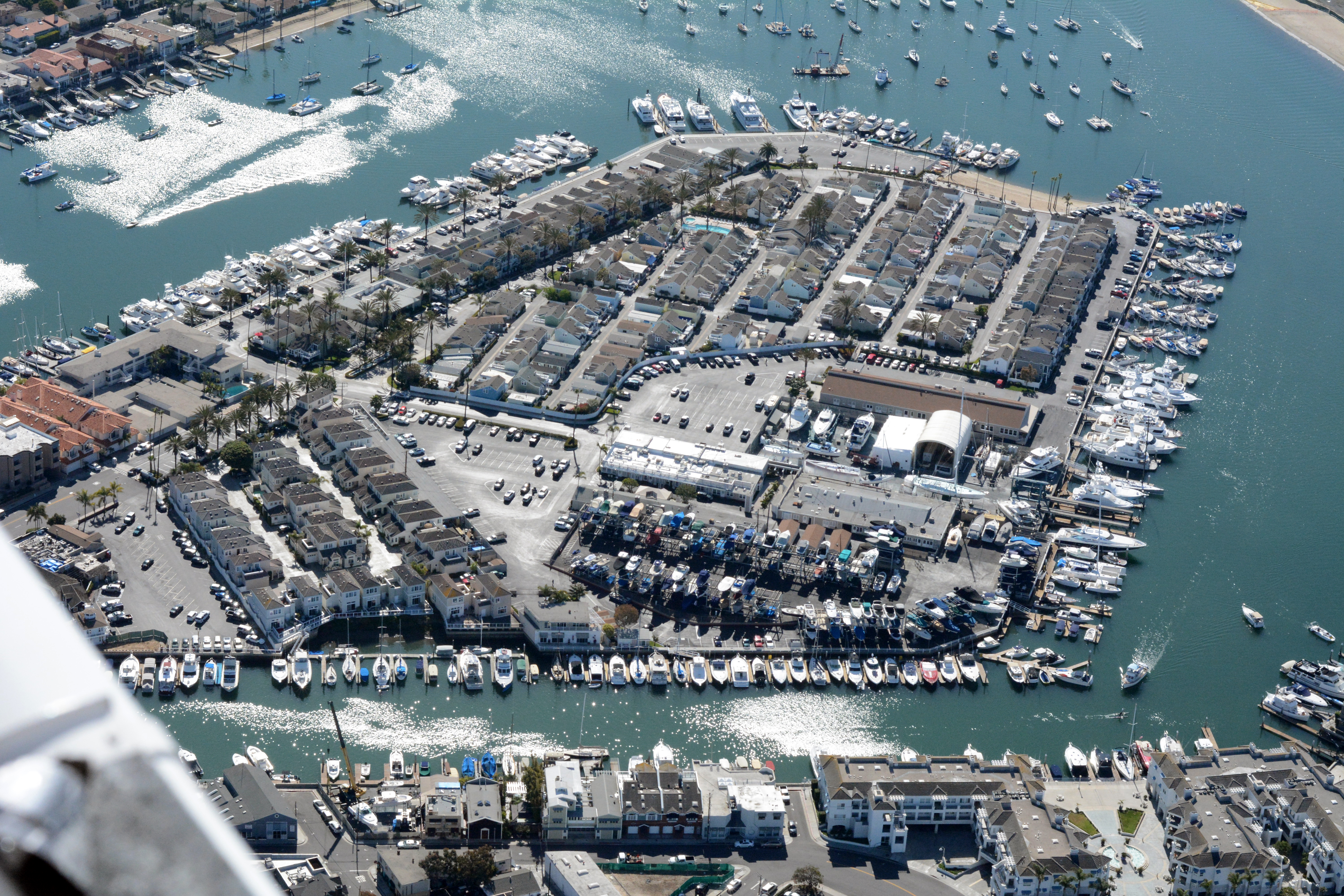
The Lido Peninsula, Newport Beach

== See also ==
- History of Newport Beach
- Balboa Island
- List of islands of California
