= South Coast Shipyard =

Shipyard in Newport, California, United States

Coordinates: 33.610608°N 117.928186°W

- Headquarters: United States
- Products: Auxiliary motor minesweepers

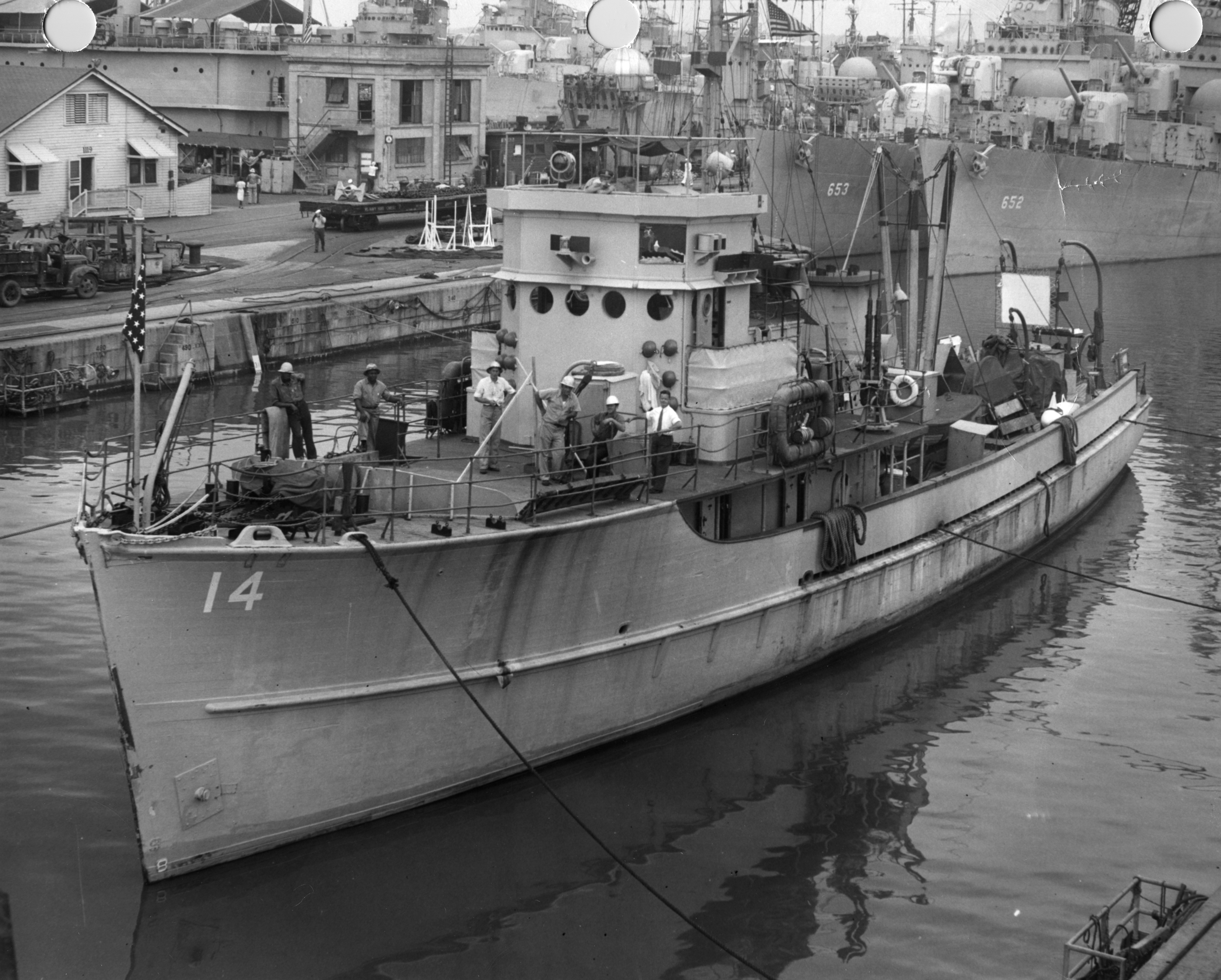
The U.S. Navy auxiliary motor minesweeper USS Grosbeak (AMS-14) built by South Coast Shipyard

South Coast Shipyard was a shipbuilding company in Newport Beach, California. To support the World War II demand for ships South Coast Shipyard built: minesweepers, Torpedo Boats, Submarine chasers, & Air-sea rescue boats. South Coast Shipyard was opened in 1938 by Walton Hubbard. After World War II the shipyard continued to build ships for the US Navy till 1955. The shipyard was located at 2300 Newport Boulevard, Newport Beach, California. The shipyard ceased military operation in 1963, however is still open today as one of the prominent shipyards for private pleasurecraft in Newport Beach.

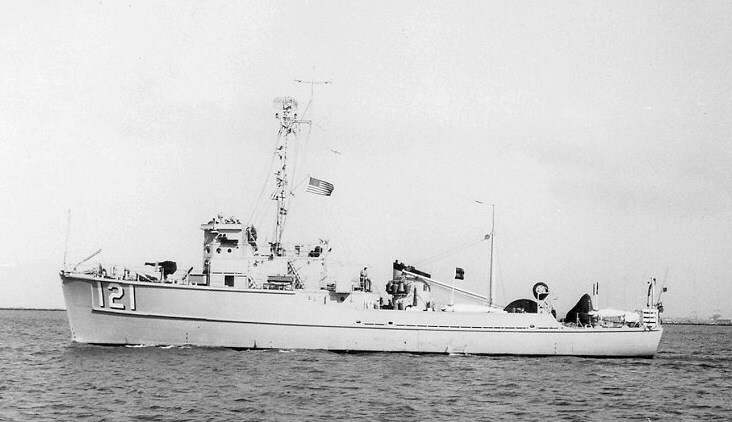
Adjutant-class minesweeper

== Auxiliary motor minesweepers ==
South Coast Company built small Auxiliary motor minesweepers in 1942 and 1943. Auxiliary motor minesweepers had a wood-hull. the ships were numbered and unnamed. The auxiliary motor minesweepers designated yard minesweepers or YMS. They serviced in the Pacific War and on the US coastal ports. South Coast Shipyard built Auxiliary motor minesweepers had a displacement of 270 tons, a length of 136 feet, a beam of 24 feet, a draft of 6 feet and top speed of 13 knots. Housing for a crew of 33. Armed with One 3-inch/50-caliber gun, two Oerlikon 20 mm cannons, two depth charge projectors and two depth charge tracks. Power was from two 800 bhp General Motors 8-268A diesel engines with a Snow and Knobstedt single reduction gear to two shafts. South Coast Shipyard built: YMS 88 to YMS 93 and YMS 259 to YMS 319. Notable ships: USS McMinnville, USS James M. Gilliss (AMCU-13), USS Simon Newcomb, USS Dutton (AGS-8) and USS Grosbeak (AMS-14).

== Adjutant-class minesweeper ==
South Coast Shipyard built Adjutant-class minesweepers, a auxiliary motor minesweepers for the United States Navy and other counties in the 1950s. Adjutant-class had a displacement of 330 long tons (340 t) light, 390 long tons (400 t) full load, a length of 138 ft (42 m), a beam of 27 ft (8.2 m) and a draft of 9 ft (2.7 m). Power was from four Packard 600 hp (450 kW) diesel engines, 2,400 hp (1,800 kW) with two screws and a top speed of 13.6 kn (25.2 km/h; 15.7 mph). Armed with two 20 mm (0.8 in) Oerlikon cannons anti-aircraft (AA) guns. Built:, Nalón (M 21/PVZ-51/P 51), Pâquerette (M 692), Pervenche (M 632/694), Renoncule (M 634/696), Roselys (M 698), and Tulipe (M 699).

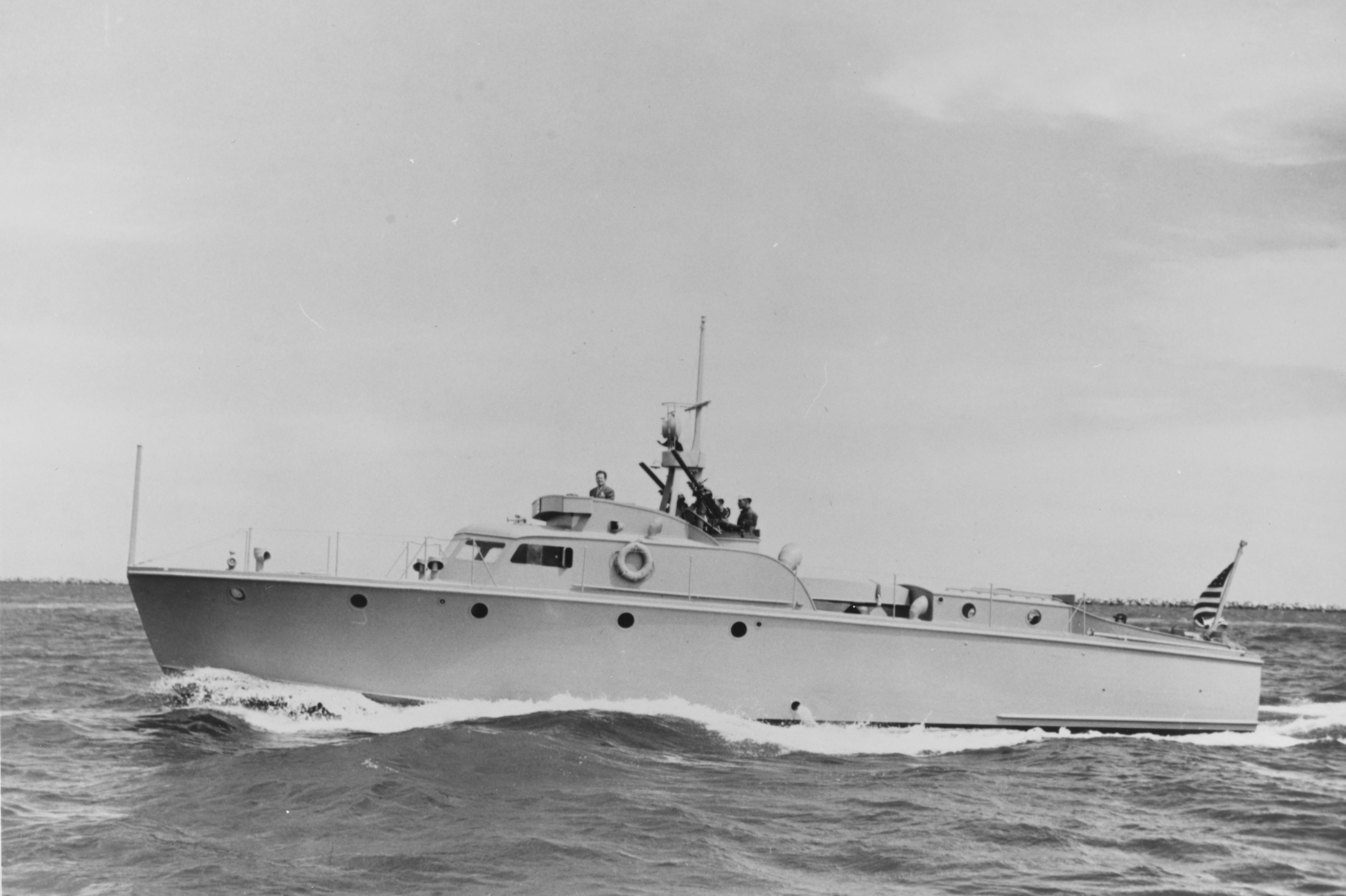
US Navy 63 foot air-sea rescue boat

== Air-sea rescue boat ==
South Coast Shipyard built in 1945 US Navy Air-sea rescue boat (C-26646 to C-26651), also called a crash boat (ARB), were: Model 314 at 23 long tons (23 t), length of 63 ft (19 m), beam of 15 ft 4 in (4.67 m), draft of 4 ft (1.2 m). Powered by 630 hp (470 kW) Hall-Scott Defender V12 petrol engines with a top speed of 31.5 knots (58.3 km/h; 36.2 mph). They had a crew of 7 or 8 and were armed with two .50 cal. M2 Browning machine guns. The boat has two rigid 795 gallon United States Rubber Company bullet sealing fuel tanks. This was a speed boat used to rescue pilots, crew and passengers from downed aircraft in search and rescue, air-sea rescue missions.

== Yard patrol boat ==
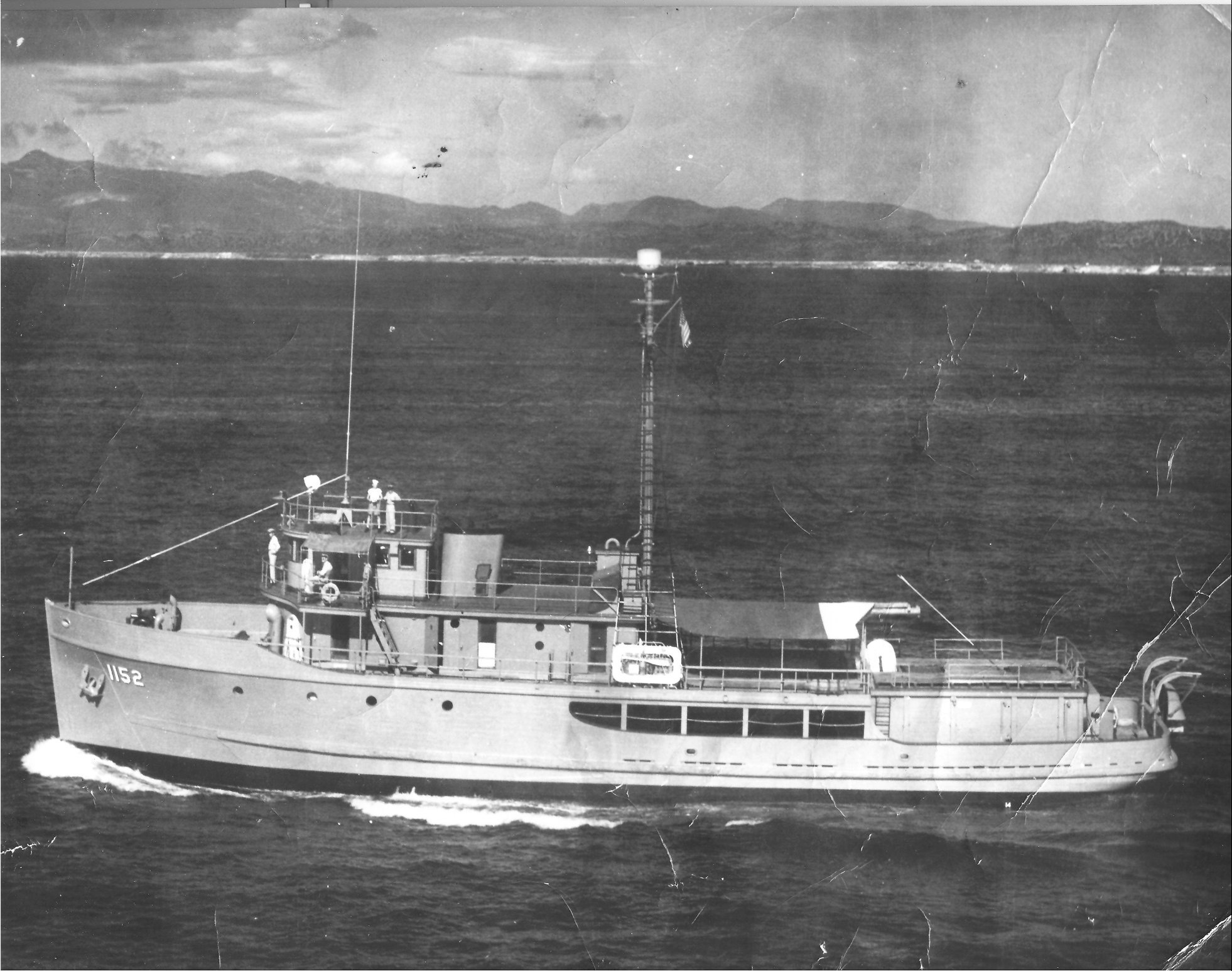
A 128-foot Yard patrol boat in 1952

Harbor Boat Building Company built two Yard patrol boats, YP 639 and YP-640. The ship housed three officers and twenty men. The boats had a length of 128 feet, beam of 30 feet, draft of 14 feet. Armed with three 20mm AA gun mounts and power with a single propeller with 560shp.

== Submarine Chaser ==
South Coast Shipyard built three submarine chaser at 169 tons with a length of 119 feet, a beam of 20 feet, a draft of 6 feet, a top speed of 15.5 knots. They had a crew of 27. Powered with diesel engines, and two propellers. They were armed with one Bofors 40 mm gun, three Oerlikon 20 mm cannon, two depth charge charge tracks and one mousetrap anti-submarine rocket. Built SC-1632, SC-1633 and SC-1634 in 1955.

== See also ==
- California during World War II
- Maritime history of California
- YMS-1-class minesweeper
- BYMS-class minesweeper
- Peyton Company
- Ackerman Boat Company
- Wooden boats of World War 2
