= Collins Island (Newport Beach, California) =

Section of Balboa Island

Coordinates: 33°36′31″N 117°54′1″W

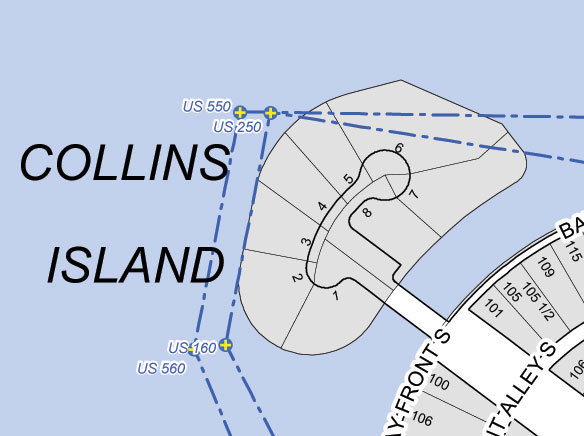
Collins Island

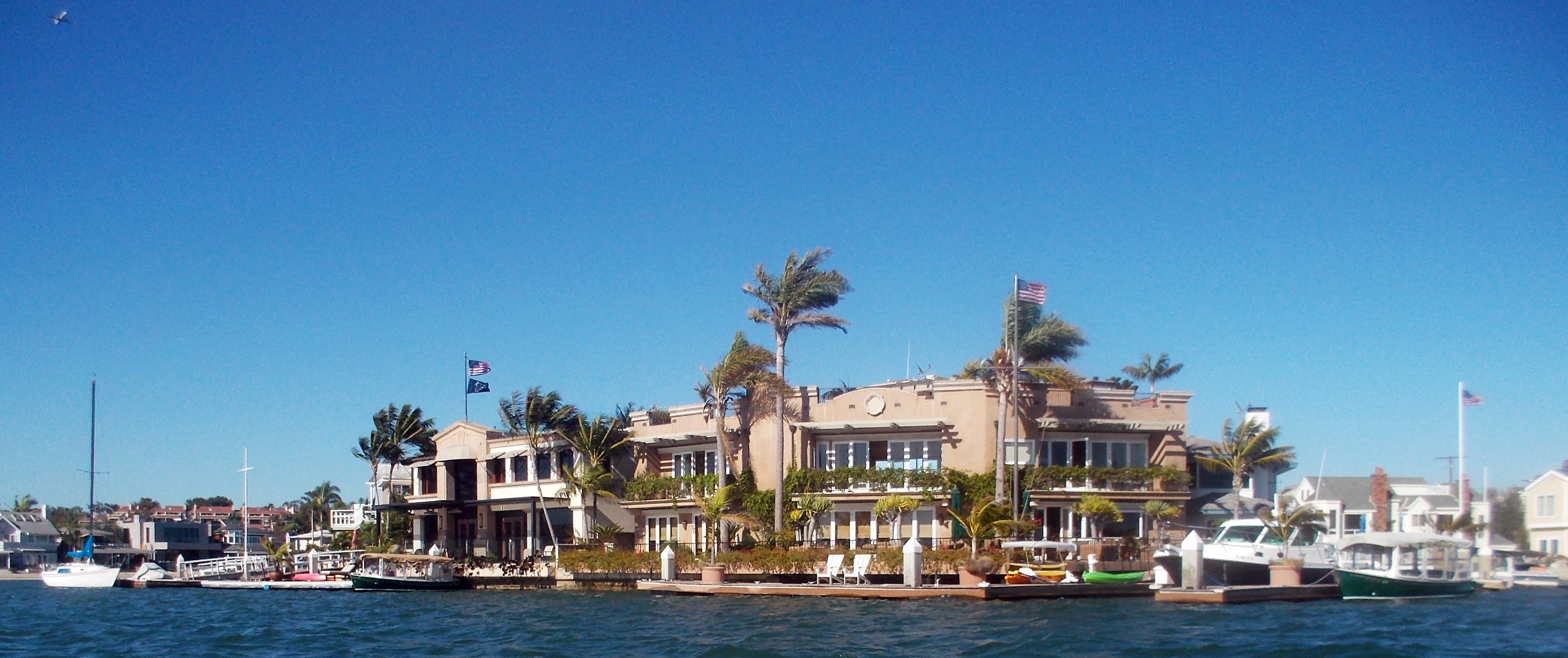
Collins Island

Collins Island is a part of Balboa Island in Newport Beach, California.

In 1902, James McFadden sold his Newport townsite and about half of the peninsula to William S. Collins, who saw Newport Bay's resort and recreation potential. Collins took on Henry E. Huntington as a partner in the Newport Beach Company. Huntington had acquired the Pacific Electric railway system and used it to promote new communities outside Los Angeles.

James Cagney bought Collins island or possibly won it in a poker game in 1938 for $32,000. The United States Coast Guard used Collins Island during World War II, and Cagney sold the island in 1948.
