= SS Sea Hawk =

SS Sea Hawk may refer to one of two Type C3-S-A2 ships built for the United States Maritime Commission by Ingalls Shipbuilding:

- SS Sea Hawk (1943) (MC hull number 391), acquired by the United States Navy and converted to Bayfield-class attack transport USS Fayette (APA-43); sold for commercial service in 1948; scrapped in 1971
- SS Sea Hawk (1945) (MC hull number 879), delivered in January 1945; sold 1947; scrapped in 1973
