= USS Dade =

U.S. Navy attack transport (1944–1946)

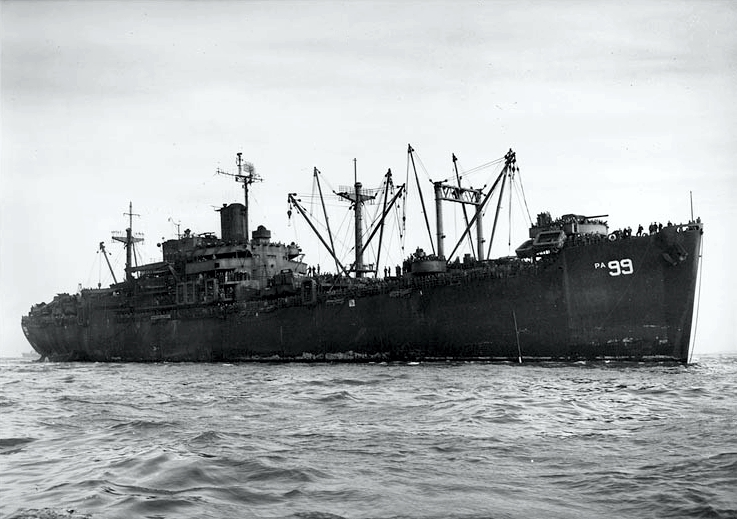
- USS Dade (APA-99) in San Francisco Bay, 17 December 1945

History

United States
- Name: USS Dade
- Namesake: Dade County, Florida; Dade County, Georgia; Dade County, Missouri
- Builder: Ingalls Shipbuilding
- Laid down: 2 November 1943
- Launched: 14 January 1944
- Christened: Lorain
- Commissioned: 11 November 1944
- Decommissioned: 25 February 1946
- Renamed: USS Dade.
- Honours and awards: One battle star for service in World War II.
- Fate: Scrapped 1970
- Notes: MC Hull No. ???.; Type C3-S-A2.; Sponsor: Mrs. J. C. Schwingle.

General characteristics
- Class & type: Bayfield-class attack transport
- Displacement: 8,100 tons, 16,100 tons fully loaded
- Length: 492 ft (150 m)
- Beam: 69 ft 6 in (21.18 m)
- Draft: 26 ft 6 in (8.08 m)
- Propulsion: General Electric geared turbine, 2 × Foster Wheeler D-type boilers, single propeller, designed shaft horsepower 8,500
- Speed: 18 knots
- Boats & landing craft carried: 12 × LCVP, 4 × LCM (Mk-6), 3 × LCP(L) (MK-IV)
- Capacity: 4,800 tons (180,500 cu. ft).
- Complement: Crew: 51 officers, 524 enlisted; Flag: 43 officers, 108 enlisted.; Troops: 80 officers, 1,146 enlisted
- Armament: 2 × single 5-inch/38 cal. dual-purpose gun mounts, one fore and one aft.; 2 × twin 40 mm AA gun mounts forward, port and starboard.; 2 × single 40 mm AA gun mounts.; 18 × single 20 mm AA gun mounts.

USS Dade (APA-99) was a Bayfield-class attack transport that served with the United States Navy from 1944 to 1946. in 1947, she was sold into commercial service and was scrapped in 1970.

== History ==
Dade was launched 14 January 1944 by Ingalls Shipbuilding, Pascagoula, Mississippi, under a Maritime Commission contract; transferred to the Navy 29 April and placed in partial commission the same day; decommissioned 9 May for conversion at Todd-Hoboken Yards, Hoboken, New Jersey; and placed in full commission 11 November 1944.

=== Pacific War ===
Departing Norfolk, Virginia 15 December 1944 Dade arrived at San Francisco 30 December to embark passengers and cargo. On 7 January 1945 she sailed for Espiritu Santo, New Hebrides, and Tulagi, Solomon Islands where she off-loaded her passengers and cargo and trained for the forthcoming assault on Okinawa.

After final staging at Ulithi, Dade participated in the invasion landings at Okinawa 1 April, landing Marines and combat cargo on Blue Beach and embarking casualties under frequent air attack. Sailing to Pearl Harbor, she arrived 23 April to embark Navy and Marine passengers, casualties, and medical evacuees for San Francisco.

After overhaul, Dade departed San Francisco 22 June 1945 via Pearl Harbor, to San Pedro Bay, Philippine Islands, with construction battalion men and cargo, arriving 27 July. She served as receiving ship at Eniwetok from 13 to 19 August.

With the end of the war, Dade returned to the Philippines, embarking troops at Manila for the occupation of Japan and landing them at Yokohama 13 September. Aiding in the reoccupation of China, she carried American marines from Guam to Qingdao, and Chinese troops from Indochina to Chinwangtao and Taku. She embarked homeward bound troops at Manila and sailed for the West Coast, entering San Francisco Bay 17 December 1945.

=== Decommissioning and fate ===
Dade left San Francisco on 11 January 1946 for New York, arriving 29 January. She was decommissioned there 25 February and returned to the Maritime Commission the same day.

Sold to Matson Navigation Company in 1947 she was renamed Hawaiian Retailer. Following a return to the US government in 1964 she was sold for scrap in September 1970 and broken up.

== Awards ==
Dade received one battle star for World War II service.
