= USS Montour =

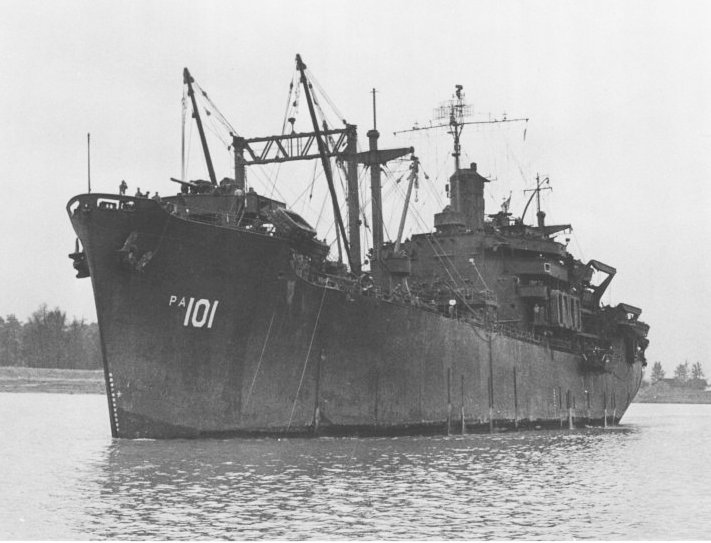

History

United States
- Namesake: Montour County, Pennsylvania
- Builder: Ingalls Shipbuilding
- Laid down: 20 October 1943
- Launched: 10 March 1944
- Christened: USS Montour
- Commissioned: 9 December 1944
- Decommissioned: 19 April 1946
- Fate: Scrapped, 1971.
- Notes: MC Hull No. 868; Type C3-S-A2

General characteristics
- Class & type: Bayfield-class attack transport
- Displacement: 8,100 tons, 16,100 tons fully loaded
- Length: 492 ft (150 m)
- Beam: 69 ft 6 in (21.18 m)
- Draft: 26 ft 6 in (8.08 m)
- Propulsion: General Electric geared turbine, 2 × Foster Wheeler D-type boilers, single propeller, designed shaft horsepower 8,500
- Speed: 18 knots
- Boats & landing craft carried: 12 × LCVP, 4 × LCM (Mk-6), 3 × LCP(L) (MK-IV)
- Capacity: 4,500 tons (180,500 cu. ft).
- Complement: Crew: 51 officers, 524 enlisted; Flag: 43 officers, 108 enlisted.; Troops: 80 officers, 1,146 enlisted
- Armament: 2 × single 5-inch/38 cal. dual-purpose gun mounts, one fore and one aft.; 2 × twin 40 mm AA gun mounts.; 2 × single 40 mm AA gun mounts.; 18 × single 20 mm AA gun mounts

USS Montour (APA-101) was a Bayfield-class attack transport which served in the United States Navy from 1944 to 1946. In 1947, she was sold into commercial service and was scrapped in 1971.

== History ==
Montour was laid down under Maritime Commission Contract 20 October 1943 by Ingalls Shipbuilding, Pascagoula, Mississippi; launched 10 March 1944; acquired by the Navy on a load charter basis and placed in partial commission 9 June 1944 to steam to Brooklyn, New York, for conversion by the Bethlehem Steel Corporation; and commissioned at New York 9 December 1944.

=== Pacific War ===
Following shakedown in Chesapeake Bay, Montour sailed for Hawaii, arriving Pearl Harbor 1 February 1945. Three days later, she proceeded to San Pedro, California, where she reported for yard work. Between 26 March and 1 August, she made two voyages to the Marianas. She embarked troops at San Francisco 11 August, and sailed for the Philippines, arriving San Pedro Bay, Leyte, on 5 September.

Assigned to transport troops destined for occupation duty in Japan, Montour departed Lingayen Gulf, arriving at Wakayama Ko, Honshū, 7 October. Montour debarked soldiers at Ise Wan, Honshū 27 October, and then reported for duty with the Operation Magic Carpet fleet for the next four months. She made two voyages from Okinawa to the West Coast, disembarking troops at Portland and San Francisco.

=== Decommissioning and fate ===
Returning to the East Coast, she decommissioned at Norfolk, Virginia, 19 April 1946. Delivered to the War Shipping Administration 23 April, Montour was struck from the Naval Vessel Register 8 May. Montour was sold to the Isthmian Steamship Company on 5 March 1948 and was renamed SS Steel Rover. She was scrapped in 1971.
