= USS Mendocino =

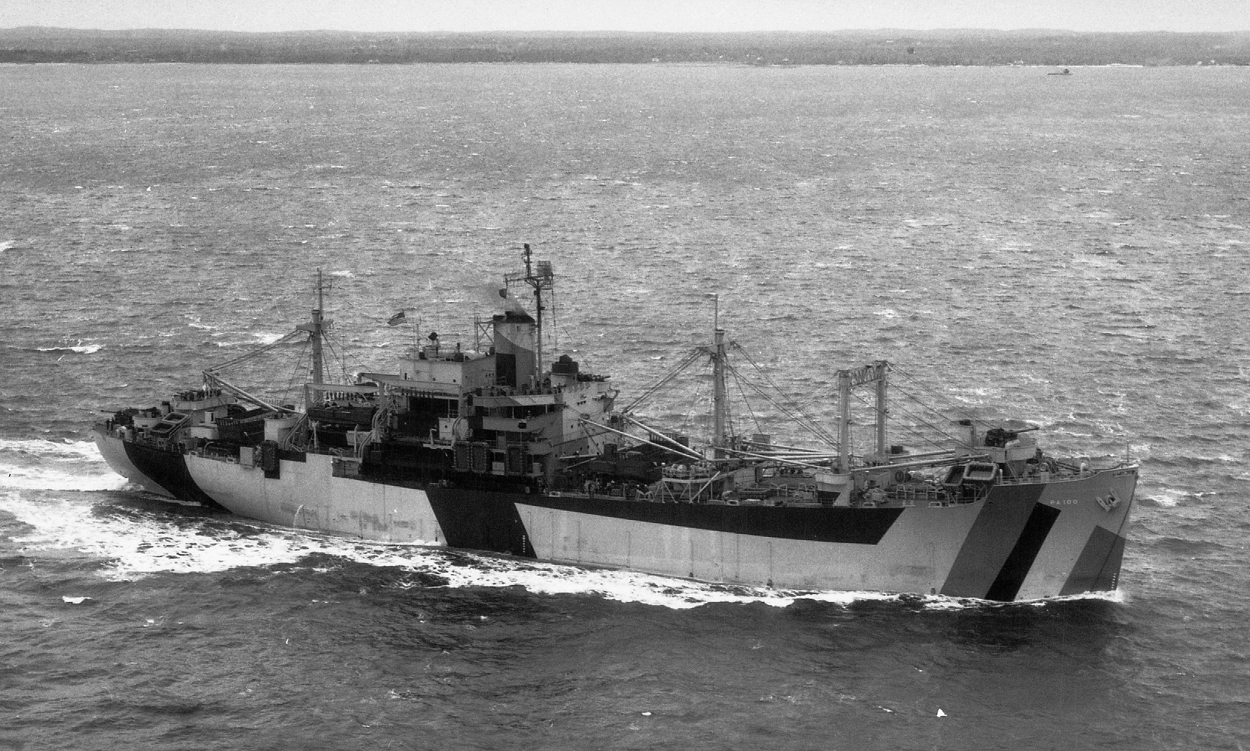

History

United States
- Namesake: Mendocino County
- Builder: Ingalls Shipbuilding
- Laid down: 20 September 1943
- Launched: 11 February 1944
- Christened: USS Mendocino
- Commissioned: 31 October 1944
- Decommissioned: 27 February 1946
- Renamed: P and T Seafarer
- Honours and awards: One battle star for service in World War II
- Fate: Scrapped, 1973.
- Notes: MC Hull No. 866; Type C3-S-A2

General characteristics
- Class & type: Bayfield-class attack transport
- Displacement: 8,100 tons, 16,100 tons fully loaded
- Length: 492 ft (150 m)
- Beam: 69 ft 6 in (21.18 m)
- Draft: 26 ft 6 in (8.08 m)
- Propulsion: General Electric geared turbine, 2 × Foster Wheeler D-type boilers, single propeller, designed shaft horsepower 8,500
- Speed: 18 knots
- Boats & landing craft carried: 12 × LCVP, 4 × LCM (Mk-6), 3 × LCP(L) (MK-IV)
- Capacity: 4,800 tons (180,500 cu. ft).
- Complement: Crew: 51 officers, 524 enlisted; Flag: 43 officers, 108 enlisted.; Troops: 80 officers, 1,146 enlisted
- Armament: 2 × single 5-inch/38 cal. dual-purpose gun mounts, one fore and one aft.; 2 × twin 40 mm AA gun mounts.; 2 × single 40 mm AA gun mounts.; 18 × single 20 mm AA gun mounts.

USS Mendocino (APA-100) was a Bayfield-class attack transport that served in the United States Navy from 1944 to 1946. In 1947, she was sold into commercial service and was scrapped in 1973.

== History ==
Mendocino was laid down under Maritime Commission contract by Ingalls Shipbuilding, Pascagoula, Mississippi, 20 September 1943; launched 11 February 1944; acquired by the Navy 23 May 1944; placed in ferry commission from 23 May to 3 June for transfer to Bethlehem Steel, Hoboken, New Jersey, prior to conversion to an attack transport; and commissioned at Hoboken 31 October 1944.

=== Pacific War ===
After shakedown in Chesapeake Bay, Mendocino embarked 705 naval passengers and departed Norfolk, Virginia, for the Pacific 10 December. She reached San Pedro, California, Christmas Day, and following a run to Pearl Harbor and back, she departed San Francisco Bay 5 February 1945 for the Philippines. She entered Leyte Gulf 28 February and during much of the next month, trained for the forthcoming invasion of Okinawa.

As flagship of Transport Squadron 14, she sortied with ships of the Southern Attack Force 27 March, and closed Okinawa early 1 April. During the amphibious assault against the Hagushi Beaches, she debarked troops of the 96th Infantry Division off Beach White I and, until 6 April, she off-loaded support equipment. She embarked Army wounded and transported them to Saipan before steaming to Pearl Harbor where she arrived 22 April.

As flagship of Transport Squadron 19, Mendocino trained in Hawaiian waters until returning to San Francisco 4 June to embark troops and load cargo. Between 29 June and 16 July, she sailed to Guam; thence, she carried veterans of the Pacific campaigns to the west coast, arriving San Francisco 4 August.

=== Occupation and Operation Magic Carpet ===
After the end of hostilities, she transported 1,523 Army officers and men to the Philippines; after embarking occupation troops at Legaspi, Luzon, she sailed in convoy for Japan 4 October. Arriving Yokohama 13 October, she discharged troops and cargo. Three days later, she joined the Operation Magic Carpet fleet and, from 26 October to 8 November, she carried returning veterans back to the United States.

=== Decommissioning and fate ===
After completing a second troop lift 27 December, she departed San Francisco 14 January 1946 and reached New York 1 February. She decommissioned there 27 February and was returned to the War Shipping Administration the same day. Her name was struck from the Navy List 12 March 1946. Mendocino was sold to Pope & Talbot, Inc. of San Francisco, and was renamed P. & T. Seafarer. She was scrapped in 1973.

== Awards ==
Mendocino received one battle star for World War II service.
