= USS Westmoreland =

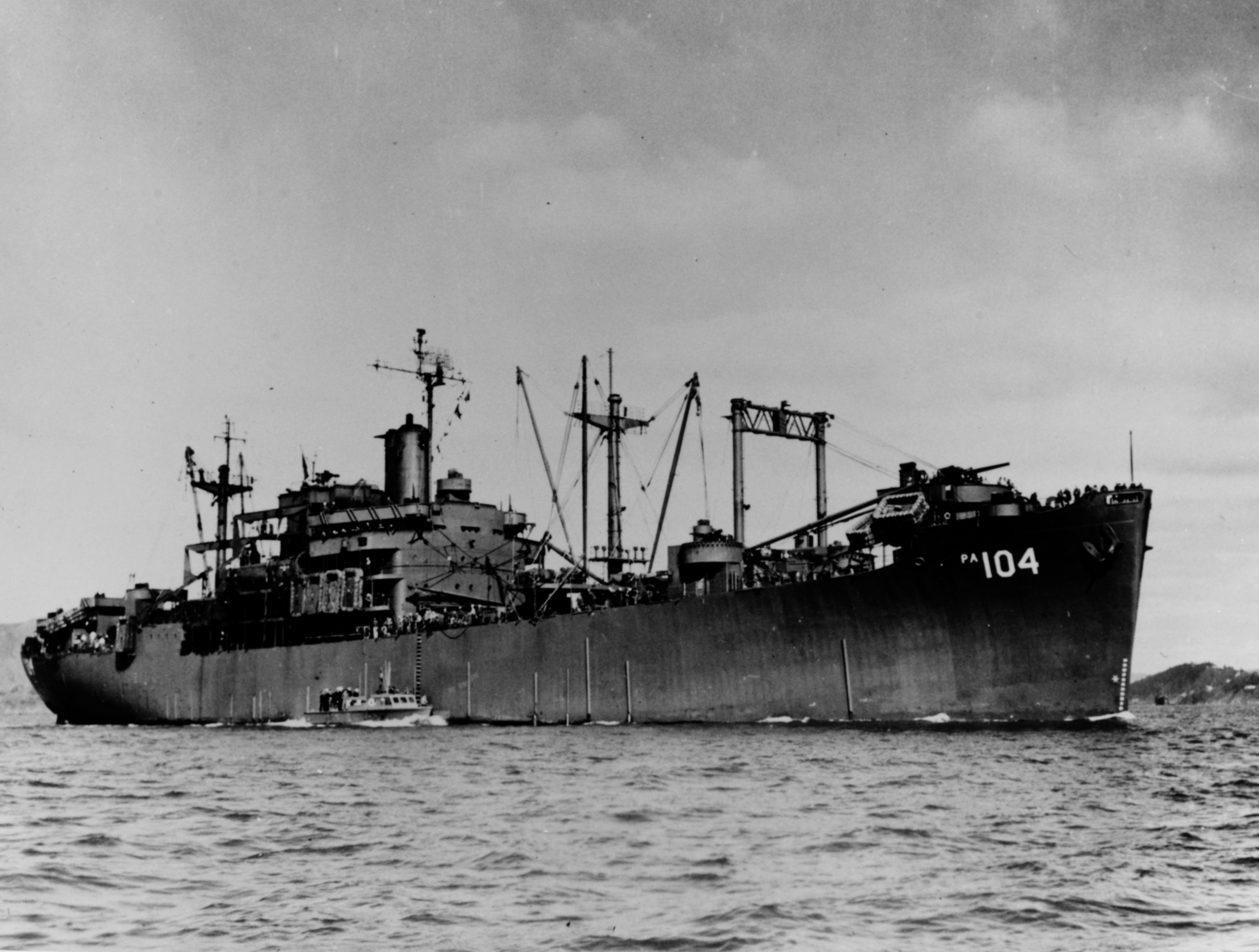

History

United States
- Name: USS Westmoreland
- Namesake: Westmoreland County, Pennsylvania; Westmoreland County, Virginia
- Builder: Ingalls Shipbuilding
- Laid down: 8 December 1943
- Launched: 28 April 1944
- Christened: USS Westmoreland
- Commissioned: 18 January 1945
- Decommissioned: 5 June 1946
- Renamed: Steel King
- Stricken: 19 June 1946
- Fate: Scrapped, 1973
- Notes: MC Hull No. 872; Type C3-S-A2

General characteristics
- Class & type: Bayfield-class attack transport
- Displacement: 8,100 tons, 16,100 tons fully loaded
- Length: 492 ft (150 m)
- Beam: 69 ft 6 in (21.18 m)
- Draft: 26 ft 6 in (8.08 m)
- Propulsion: General Electric geared turbine, 2 × Foster Wheeler D-type boilers, single propeller, designed shaft horsepower 8,500
- Speed: 18 knots
- Boats & landing craft carried: 12 × LCVP, 4 × LCM (Mk-6), 3 × LCP(L) (MK-IV)
- Capacity: 4,500 tons (180,500 cu. ft).
- Complement: Crew: 51 officers, 524 enlisted; Flag: 43 officers, 108 enlisted.; Troops: 80 officers, 1,146 enlisted
- Armament: 2 × single 5-inch/38 cal. dual-purpose gun mounts, one fore and one aft.; 2 × twin 40 mm AA gun mounts.; 2 × single 40 mm AA gun mounts.; 18 × single 20 mm AA gun mounts.

USS Westmoreland (APA-104) was a Bayfield-class attack transport in service with the United States Navy from 1945 to 1946. In 1947, she was sold into commercial service and was scrapped in 1973.

== History ==
Westmoreland was laid down under a Maritime Commission contract (MC hull 872) on 8 December 1943 at Pascagoula, Mississippi, by Ingalls Shipbuilding, launched on 28 April 1944, and placed in reduced commission for ferrying purposes, on 12 July 1944. Shifted to Todd Shipyards of Hoboken, New Jersey, for conversion to an attack transport, the ship was decommissioned on 22 July for the duration of the yard period. Once the task of fitting the ship out as an attack transport was completed, Westmoreland was placed in commission on 18 January 1945.

After spending most of February on shakedown in Chesapeake Bay, Westmoreland sailed for the Pacific on 22 February and arrived at the eastern entrance to the Panama Canal on the 27th. After transiting the canal, the attack transport pushed on for the Hawaiian Islands and reached Pearl Harbor on 14 March.

=== Transport and training operations ===
After training in Hawaiian waters, the ship returned to the west coast at the end of May for voyage repairs at San Pedro, California. In mid-June, she shifted northward to load troops and cargo at Portland, Oregon, for transportation to Hawaii. Westmoreland subsequently conducted one round-trip voyage between Pearl Harbor and San Francisco in July and then spent most of the first half of the month of August on exercises and further training in Hawaiian waters. During that time, the Japanese, worn down by ceaseless Allied pounding from the air and from the sea, surrendered on 15 August 1945.

=== Occupation and demobilization missions ===
Although Westmoreland had been commissioned too late to participate in combat against the Japanese in the Pacific, she nevertheless did take part in the massive reverse movement of men back to the United States, Operation Magic Carpet. The attack transport subsequently called at Manila, in the Philippines, and Sasebo, Japan, operating with Transport Squadron 22, and brought back troops to Portland, before she returned to the Philippines once more. She carried a draft of troops from Samar to San Francisco before heading for the East Coast of the United States. She transited the Panama Canal on 8 April 1946 and arrived at Norfolk five days later.

=== Decommissioning and fate ===
Westmoreland was decommissioned there on 5 June 1946 and was struck from the Navy List on 19 June. Acquired by the Isthmian Steamship Company (later called Isthmian Lines) in July 1947, Westmoreland was renamed Steel King. The former attack transport carried general cargo for her company until she was sold for scrap in 1973.
