= USS Hampton (APA-115) =

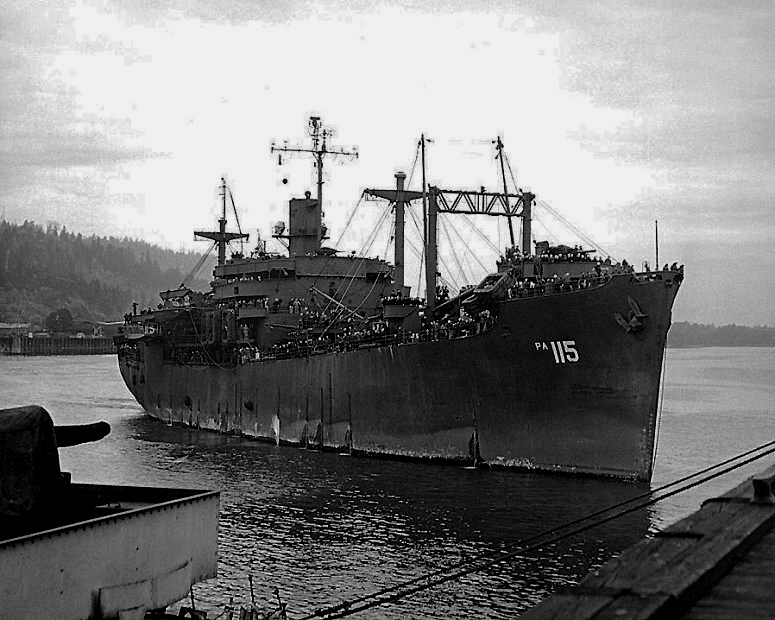

History

United States
- Name: USS Hampton
- Namesake: Hampton County, South Carolina
- Builder: Ingalls Shipbuilding
- Laid down: Unknown
- Launched: 25 August 1944
- Christened: USS Hampton
- Commissioned: 17 February 1945
- Decommissioned: 30 April 1946
- Renamed: P & T Explorer.
- Fate: Scrapped, 1973.
- Notes: MC Hull No. 876; Type C3-S-A2

General characteristics
- Class & type: Bayfield-class attack transport
- Displacement: 8,100 tons, 16,100 tons fully loaded
- Length: 492 ft (150 m)
- Beam: 69 ft 6 in (21.18 m)
- Draft: 26 ft 6 in (8.08 m)
- Propulsion: General Electric geared turbine, 2 × Foster Wheeler D-type boilers, single propeller, designed shaft horsepower 8,500
- Speed: 18 knots
- Boats & landing craft carried: 12 × LCVP, 4 × LCM (Mk-6), 3 × LCP(L) (MK-IV)
- Capacity: 4,800 tons (180,500 cu. ft).
- Complement: Crew: 51 officers, 524 enlisted; Flag: 43 officers, 108 enlisted.; Troops: 80 officers, 1,146 enlisted
- Armament: 2 × single 5-inch/38 cal. dual-purpose gun mounts, one fore and one aft.; 2 × twin 40 mm AA gun mounts.; 2 × single 40 mm AA gun mounts.; 18 × single 20 mm AA gun mounts.

USS Hampton (APA-115) was a Bayfield-class attack transport that served with the United States Navy from 1945 to 1946. She was old into commercial service in 1947 and was scrapped in 1973.

== History ==
Hampton was launched 25 August 1944 under Maritime Commission contract by Ingalls Shipbuilding of Pascagoula, Mississippi, and commissioned 17 February 1945.

=== U.S. Navy (1945–1947) ===
After completing her shakedown training out of Galveston, Hampton arrived Newport, Rhode Island 20 March for duty as a training ship for pre-commissioning crews. She continued this vital duty until departing 7 May for Norfolk, Virginia, to embark troops destined for Hawaii. The transport sailed 19 May and arrived Pearl Harbor via the Panama Canal 9 June. At Hawaii Hampton embarked over 1,000 members of the 34th Construction Battalion and sailed for Guam where she arrived 6 July 1945. After disembarking her Seabees, so vital to the success of the island campaign in the Pacific, the transport sailed to the east, arriving San Francisco 25 July.

Hampton sailed from San Francisco 13 August, just prior to the surrender of Japan, and arrived Samar Island via Ulithi and Eniwetok 7 September. Joining the vast fleet carrying occupation forces to Japan, Hampton landed troops at Aomori Bay, Honshū, 25 September, and then returned to Okinawa for more occupation units. During October she carried these troops to Jinsen, Korea; Chefoo and Qingdao, China, helping to speed occupation of these ports and stabilize the volatile China situation.

Hampton departed Qingdao for Portland, Oregon, via Okinawa and Leyte, arriving 28 October 1945. She then made two voyages to Guam as part of the Operation Magic Carpet fleet, performing the giant task of bringing home the thousands of Pacific veterans. After returning to the Pacific coast from the second voyage 10 February 1946, the transport sailed for the East Coast, arriving Norfolk 7 March. She decommissioned 30 April 1946 and was returned to the Maritime Commission 1 May.

=== Commercial service (1947–1973) ===
In 1947 Hampton was sold to Pope and Talbot Lines and renamed P. & T. Explorer. Acquired by American Foreign Steamship Corporation in 1963 as SS American Falcon. She was scrapped in 1973.
