= USS Hamblen =

1944 Bayfield-class attack transport

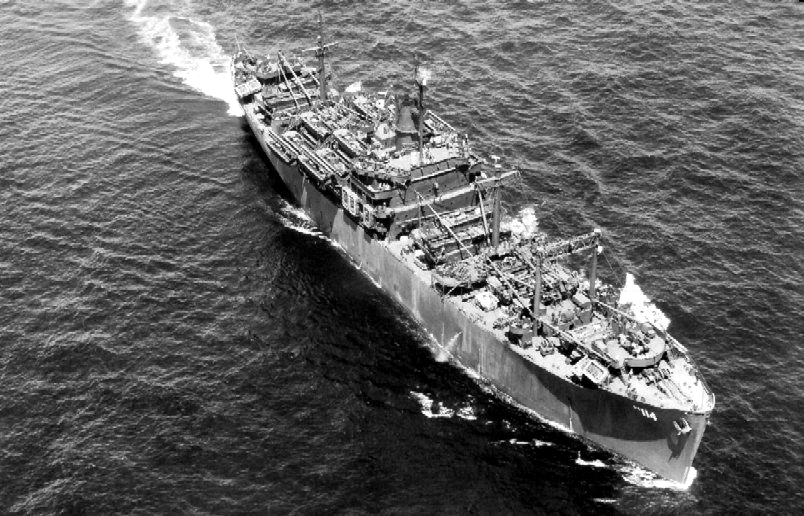

History

United States
- Namesake: Hamblen County, Tennessee
- Builder: Ingalls Shipbuilding
- Laid down: Unknown
- Launched: 30 June 1944
- Christened: USS Hamblen
- Commissioned: 12 June 1945
- Decommissioned: 1 May 1946
- Renamed: Steel Voyager.
- Fate: Scrapped, 1973.
- Notes: MC Hull No. 876; Type C3-S-A2

General characteristics
- Class & type: Bayfield-class attack transport
- Displacement: 8,100 tons, 16,100 tons fully loaded
- Length: 492 ft (150 m)
- Beam: 69 ft 6 in (21.18 m)
- Draft: 26 ft 6 in (8.08 m)
- Propulsion: General Electric geared turbine, 2 × Foster Wheeler D-type boilers, single propeller, designed shaft horsepower 8,500
- Speed: 18 knots
- Boats & landing craft carried: 12 × LCVP, 4 × LCM (Mk-6), 3 × LCP(L) (MK-IV)
- Capacity: 4,800 tons (180,500 cu. ft).
- Complement: Crew: 51 officers, 524 enlisted; Flag: 43 officers, 108 enlisted.; Troops: 80 officers, 1,146 enlisted
- Armament: 2 × single 5-inch/38 cal. dual-purpose gun mounts, one fore and one aft.; 2 × twin 40 mm AA gun mounts.; 2 × single 40 mm AA gun mounts.; 18 × single 20 mm AA gun mounts.

USS Hamblen (APA-114) was a Bayfield-class attack transport in service with the United States Navy from 1945 to 1946. She was sold into commercial service in 1948 and was scrapped in 1973.

== History ==
Hamblen was named for Hamblen County, Tennessee. She was launched under Maritime Commission contract by Ingalls Shipbuilding of Pascagoula, Mississippi, 30 July 1944, and commissioned after conversion 12 June 1945.

=== U.S. Navy (1945–1948) ===
After shakedown training out of Galveston, Hamblen loaded passengers and cargo at New Orleans and arrived San Juan, Puerto Rico, 25 July 1945. There she embarked a contingent of Puerto Rican army troops and steamed westward 26 July for Hawaii, via the Panama Canal.

Shortly after her arrival 11 August, the war ended, and Hamblen took up the task of bringing replacement troops into the forward areas and transporting veterans back to the United States. Embarking Marines at Hilo, Hamblen sailed for Japan, circled for an unknown number of days while en route, unloading her marines to secure the Japanese naval base Sasebo. Subsequently, she made voyages to Wakayama and uploaded supplies and sailed to Lingayen Gulf and offloaded onto the beach the supplies. Sailed to Manila for R&R. Sailed to Okinawa, where Hamblen took returning servicemen on board as part of Operation Magic Carpet, the giant operation which accomplished the task of bringing home American servicemen. From Okinawa she sailed eastward to San Pedro, California, arriving there 24 November 1945.

Hamblen made one more voyage for Magic Carpet, arriving at Okinawa 26 December and arriving Tacoma, Washington, 17 January 1946. The ship was designated for return to the Maritime Commission, released 23 January 1946, and sailed to the Canal Zone, where she arrived 22 February. Hamblen continued to Norfolk, Virginia, where she decommissioned 1 May 1946. Six days later she was returned to the Maritime Commission.

=== Commercial service (1948–1973) ===
In 1948 the vessel was sold to Isthmian Lines whom she served as merchant ship Steel Voyager. The ship was scrapped in 1973.
