= USS Elmore =

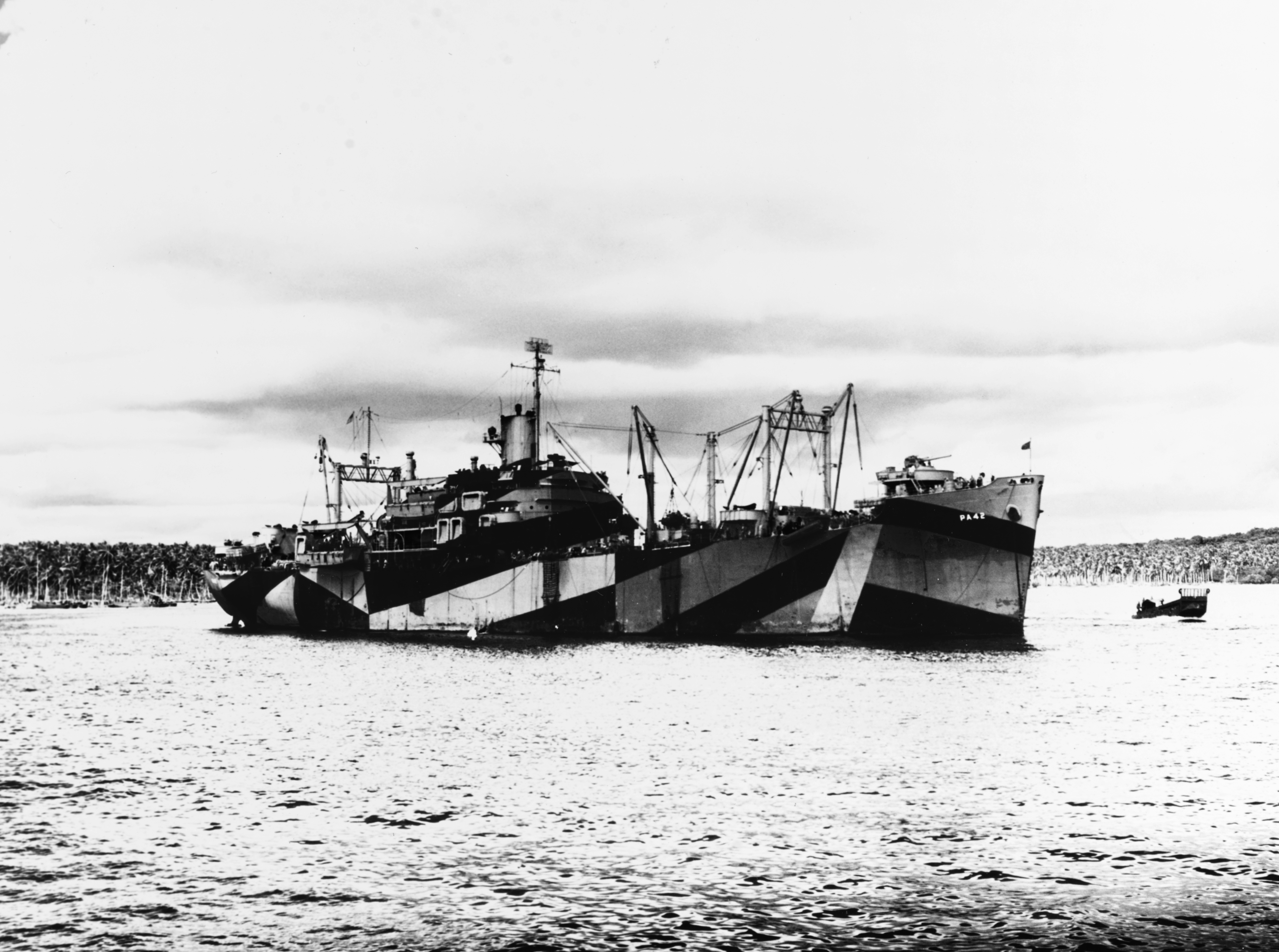

History

United States
- Namesake: Elmore County, Alabama; Elmore County, Idaho
- Builder: Ingalls Shipbuilding
- Laid down: 24 June 1942
- Launched: 29 January 1943
- Sponsored by: Walter F. George (wife of the Georgia Senator)
- Christened: Sea Panther
- Commissioned: 25 August 1943
- Decommissioned: 13 March 1946
- Renamed: USS Elmore, Sea Panther, China Transport, Idaho.
- Reclassified: 25 August 1943 (AP-87 to APA-42).
- Honours and awards: Eight battle stars for service in World War II.
- Fate: Scrapped, 1971.
- Notes: MC Hull No. 390.; Type C3-S-A2.

General characteristics
- Class & type: Bayfield-class attack transport
- Displacement: 8,100 tons, 16,100 tons fully loaded
- Length: 492 ft (150 m)
- Beam: 69 ft 6 in (21.18 m)
- Draft: 26 ft 6 in (8.08 m)
- Propulsion: General Electric geared turbine, 2 × Foster Wheeler D-type boilers, single propeller, designed shaft horsepower 8,500
- Speed: 18 knots
- Boats & landing craft carried: 12 × LCVP, 4 × LCM (Mk-6), 3 × LCP(L) (MK-IV)
- Capacity: 4,700 tons (200,000 cu. ft).
- Complement: Crew: 51 officers, 524 enlisted; Flag: 43 officers, 108 enlisted.; Troops: 80 officers, 1,146 enlisted
- Armament: 2 × single 5-inch/38 cal. dual-purpose gun mounts, one fore and one aft.; 2 × quad 1.1"/75-caliber gun mounts aft port and starboard, replaced by 2 × twin 40 mm AA gun mounts.; 2 × single 40 mm AA gun mounts.; 18 × single 20 mm AA gun mounts.

USS Elmore (APA-42) was a Bayfield-class attack transport in service with the United States Navy from 1943 to 1946. She was then sold into commercial service and was scrapped in 1971.

== History ==
Elmore (AP-87) was launched 29 January 1943 as Sea Panther by Ingalls Shipbuilding of Pascagoula, Mississippi, under a Maritime Commission contract, reclassified (APA-42) on 1 February; transferred to the Navy 30 March and placed in partial commission the same day for ferry to Maryland Drydock Company, Baltimore for conversion, and commissioned in full 25 August 1943.

=== Pacific War ===
Elmore sailed from San Diego 13 January 1944 and landed troops and equipment in the initial assault on the Marshalls 31 January 1944. In early February she reported to the 3d Fleet at Funafuti, Ellice Islands. After training in the Solomons, she took part in the landings on Emirau Island 11 April, and carried troops between Guadalcanal and New Guinea until 3 June. On the 4th she got underway for invasion of the Marianas.

Elmore landed troops in the assault on Guam 21 July 1944 and remained to embark casualties whom she carried to Eniwetok. She returned to the Solomons for training, then saw action in the first wave against the Palaus 15 September. She staged at Hollandia for the coming Philippine invasion and sailed 13 October for the Leyte assault a week later. Landing troops and cargo under heavy fire, Elmore lost one killed and five wounded.

Returning to Manus and New Guinean ports, Elmore prepared for the northern Luzon assault. On 9 January 1945 she was in Lingayen Gulf for the initial landings. She remained to support the fighters ashore, and on 29 January landed troops without opposition near San Felipe. She returned to Leyte in February to be mother ship for the boat pool and to direct unloading of merchant ships.

Elmore sailed from Leyte 27 March 1945 for the invasion of Okinawa on 1 April. Four days after the assault she carried casualties to Guam, continuing to Seattle for overhaul. She was on her way back when the war ended and upon arrival at Leyte 30 August was assigned to redeploy troops through the Philippines. Elmore made two voyages to Japan to land occupation troops at Wakayama and Mitsugahama, then returned to the States on "Magic Carpet" duty with servicemen eligible for discharge.

=== Decommissioning and fate ===
After a voyage on the same duty to the Philippines from November 1945 to January 1946, she was decommissioned at Mobile, Alabama, 13 March, and returned to the Maritime Commission for sale 15 May 1946. After decommissioning, Elmore's name reverted to Sea Panther when she was leased in 1946 for commercial service. In 1947 she was renamed China Transport. In 1958 she was renamed Oregon and in 1960 was again renamed, to Idaho. The vessel was returned to the Maritime Administration in 1966 and scrapped at Portland, Oregon, in 1971.

== Awards ==
Elmore received eight battle stars for World War II service.
