= USS Hanover =

WW2 attack transport vessel

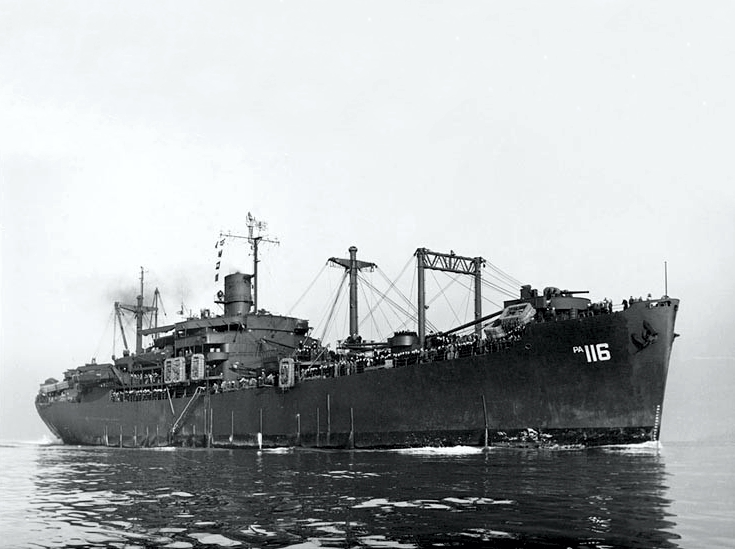
- USS Hanover (APA-116), 20 February 1946

History

United States
- Name: Hanover
- Namesake: Hanover County, Virginia
- Builder: Ingalls Shipbuilding
- Laid down: Unknown
- Launched: 18 August 1944
- Sponsored by: Mrs. Stanley M. Bebler
- Commissioned: 31 March 1945
- Decommissioned: 11 May 1946
- Renamed: Hawaiian Wholesaler, Ventura.
- Fate: Scrapped, 1972.
- Notes: MC Hull No. 878.; Type C3-S-A2.

General characteristics
- Class & type: Bayfield-class attack transport
- Displacement: 8,100 tons, 16,100 tons fully loaded
- Length: 492 ft (150 m)
- Beam: 69 ft 6 in (21.18 m)
- Draft: 26 ft 6 in (8.08 m)
- Propulsion: General Electric geared turbine, 2 x Foster Wheeler D-type boilers, single propeller, designed shaft horsepower 8,500
- Speed: 18 knots
- Boats & landing craft carried: 12 x LCVP, 4 x LCM (Mk-6), 3 x LCP(L) (MK-IV)
- Capacity: 4,500 tons (180,500 cu. ft).
- Complement: Crew: 51 officers, 524 enlisted; Flag: 43 officers, 108 enlisted.; Troops: 80 officers, 1,146 enlisted
- Armament: 2 × single 5 inch/38 cal. dual purpose gun mounts, one fore and one aft.; 2 × twin 40mm AA gun mounts.; 2 × single 40mm AA gun mounts.; 18 × single 20mm AA gun mounts.

USS Hanover (APA-116) was a Bayfield-class attack transport in service with the United States Navy from 1945 to 1946. In 1947, she was sold into commercial service. The ship was scrapped in 1972.

== History ==
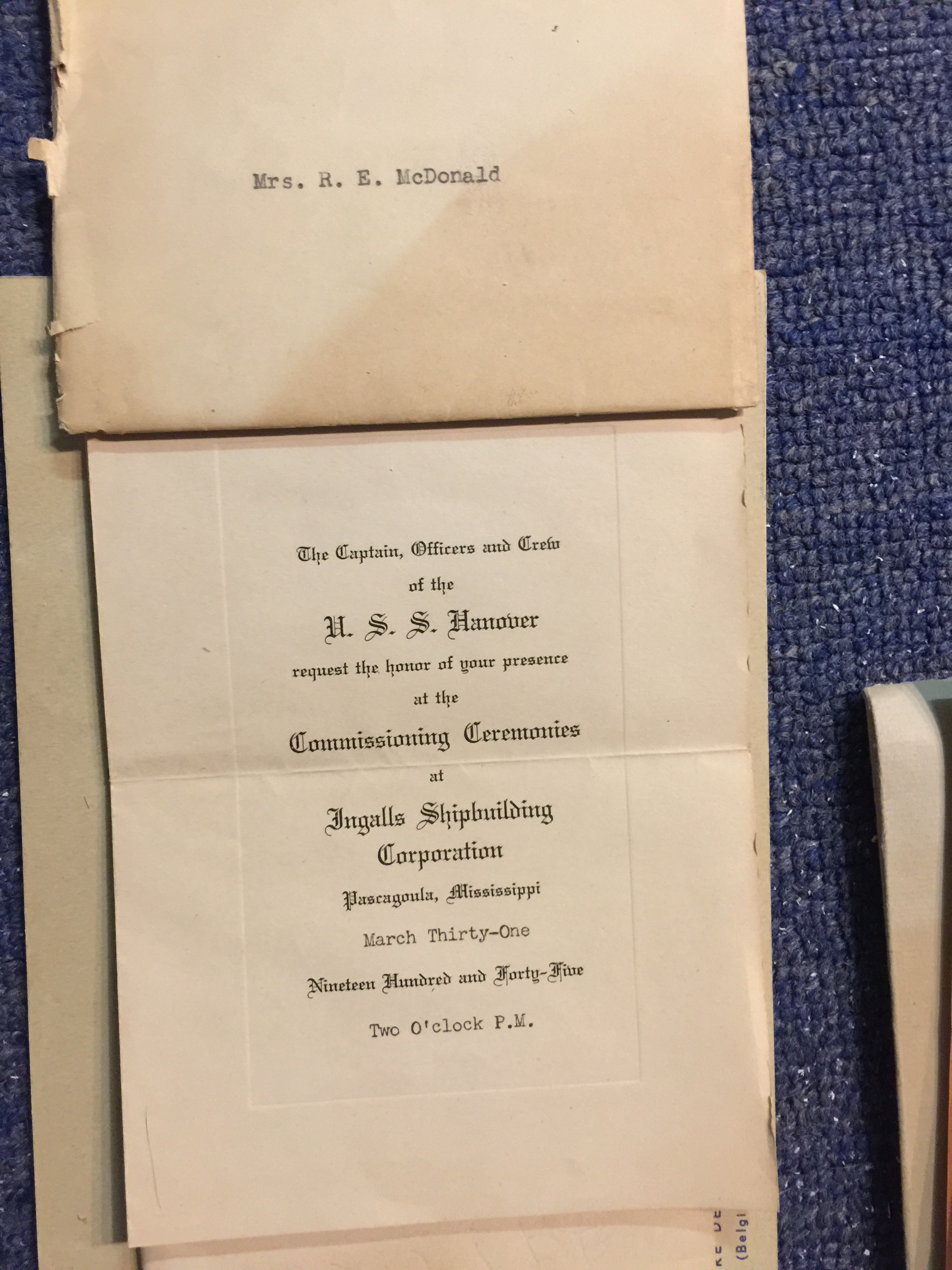
Invitation to the Commissioning Ceremony of the U.S.S. Hanover, 31 March 1945

Hanover was launched under Maritime Commission contract by Ingalls Shipbuilding of Pascagoula, Mississippi, 18 August 1944, loaned to the Navy and simultaneously commissioned 31 March 1945.

After conducting a brief shakedown cruise off Galveston, Texas, Hanover arrived Gulfport, Mississippi, 3 May 1945 and began loading Marines and SeaBees for transportation to the Pacific. She got underway 6 May and sailed to Pearl Harbor, carrying out training operations en route. After her arrival 24 May, the ship unloaded her troops for further transfer and until 6 June took part in underway training operations in Hawaiian waters. She then sailed for San Francisco in company with other transports, and just before reaching California was diverted to Portland, Oregon, where she arrived 19 June.

Hanover got underway 1 July for Eniwetok Atoll, an important Pacific staging area, expecting to take part in the final assault on Japan. Arriving 14 July, she sailed in convoy 3 days later, bound for Ulithi. The ship remained at this base briefly, using the rest and recreation at Mog Mog island, which is a part of the Ulithi atoll.

She stopped in Manila, Philippines. She was soon bound for Okinawa, where she arrived 12 August 1945. Hanover unloaded replacement troops on that battle-scarred island, and after the close of the war prepared to take part in the occupation.

=== After hostilities ===
After embarking Army units, Hanover sailed 5 September for Jinsen, Korea, to aid in the occupation, and unloaded her troops three days later. The transport returned to Okinawa 14 September but was soon forced to stand out to sea to ride out the great typhoon of September 1945. After the severe weather subsided, Hanover returned to Okinawa and loaded troops for the occupation of China. She arrived in Taku 30 September to help stabilize the troubled situation there and aid in the consolidation of the area by Nationalist forces.

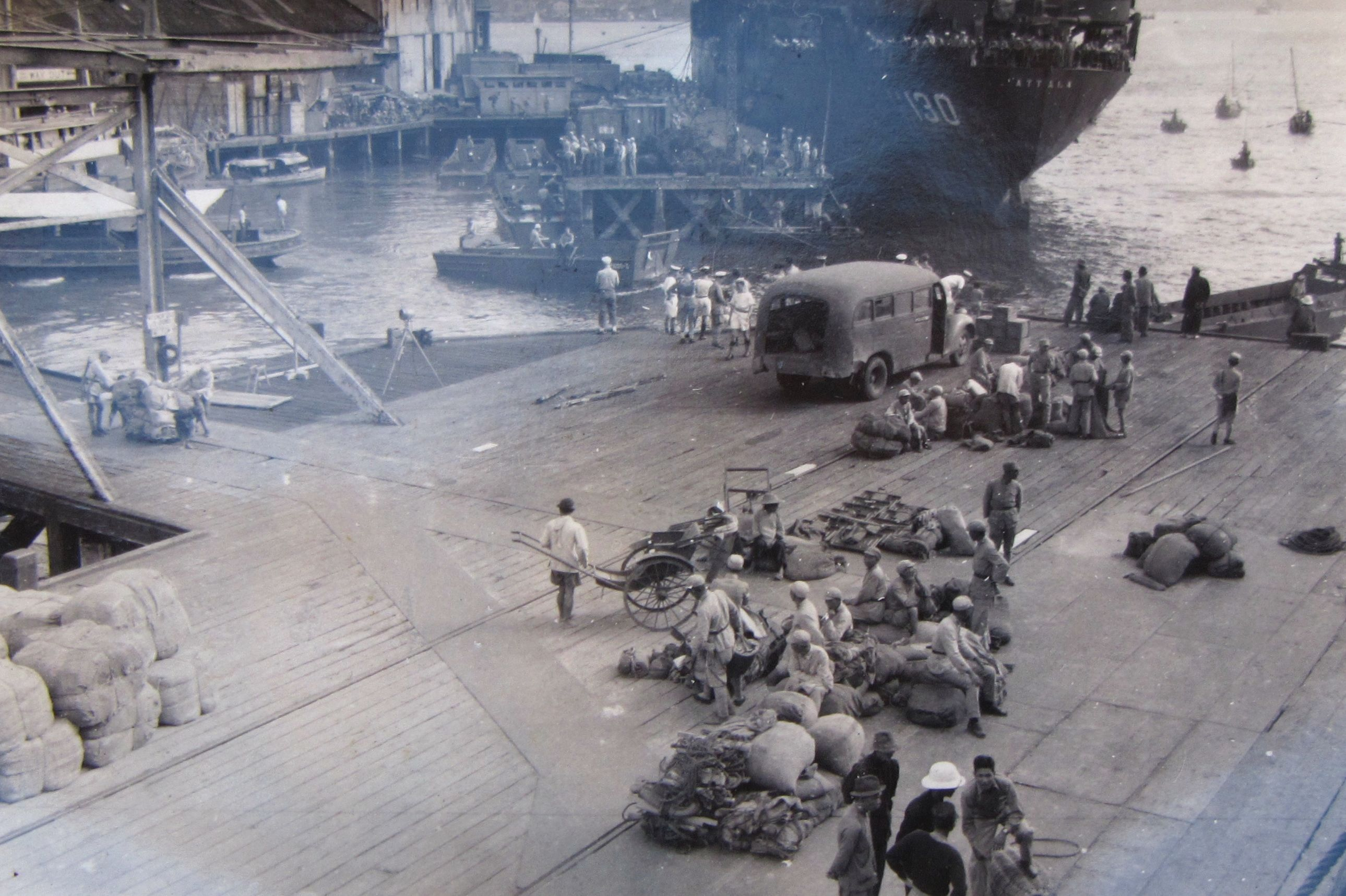
USS Hanover APA116 with Chinese Nationalists loading in South China in October or November 1945

=== Operation Magic Carpet ===
Hanover's next assignment was with the Operation Magic Carpet fleet, bringing home American troops from the Pacific.

She arrived San Francisco on her last voyage 6 February 1946, and was ordered to steam via the Panama Canal on to Norfolk, Virginia, where she arrived 9 March.

The ship decommissioned on 11 May 1946 and was returned to the Maritime Commission the next day.

== Commercial service ==
The Hanover was purchased by Oceanic Steamship Company in 1947. In 1965 traded to Matson and renamed Venturea No.3. In 1970, she was sold and renamed Entu. The ship was finally scrapped in Taiwan in 1972.
