= USS Fremont =

US Navy ship

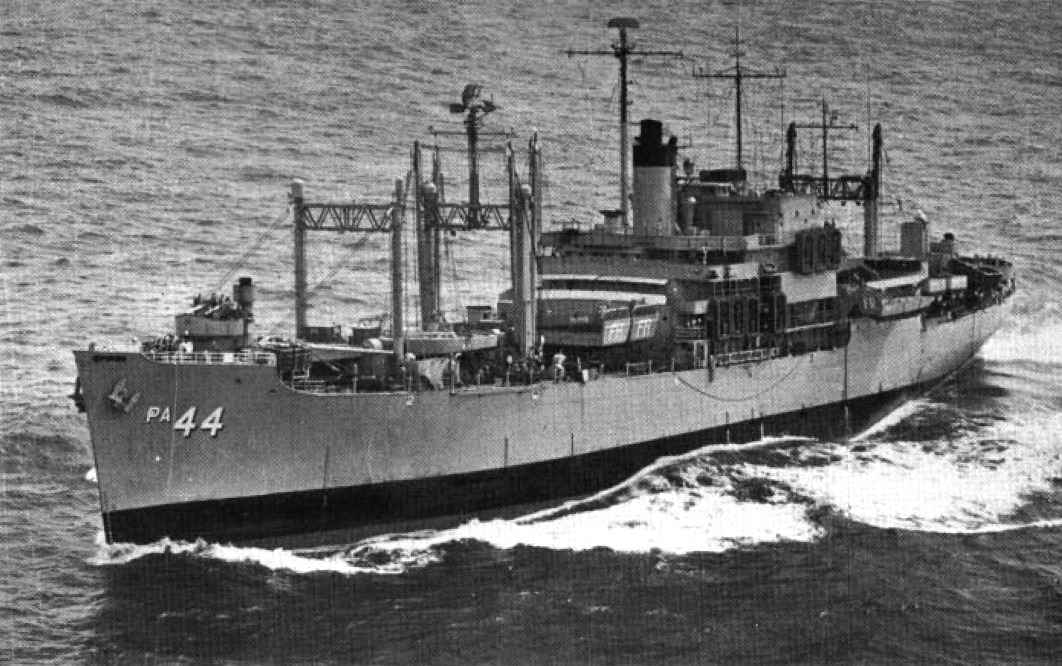
- USS Fremont (APA-44)

History

United States
- Namesake: Fremont County, Colorado; Fremont County, Idaho; Fremont County, Iowa; Fremont County, Wyoming
- Builder: Ingalls Shipbuilding
- Laid down: Unknown
- Launched: 31 March 1943
- Christened: Sea Corsair.
- Commissioned: 29 November 1943
- Decommissioned: 3 September 1969
- Renamed: USS Fremont
- Reclassified: AP-89 to APA-44 (1 Feb '43).
- Stricken: 1 June 1973.
- Nickname(s): M.2.S
- Honours and awards: Five battle stars for service in World War II.
- Fate: Scrapped, 1974.
- Notes: MC Hull No. 392.; Type C3-S-A2.; Sponsor: Mrs. W. R. Guest.

General characteristics
- Class & type: Bayfield-class attack transport
- Displacement: 8,100 tons, 16,100 tons fully loaded
- Length: 492 ft (150 m)
- Beam: 69 ft 6 in (21.18 m)
- Draft: 26 ft 6 in (8.08 m)
- Propulsion: General Electric geared turbine, 2 x Foster Wheeler D-type boilers, single propeller, designed shaft horsepower 8,500
- Speed: 18 knots
- Boats & landing craft carried: 12 x LCVP, 4 x LCM (Mk-6), 3 x LCP(L) (MK-IV)
- Capacity: 4,700 tons (175,000 cu. ft).
- Complement: Crew: 51 officers, 524 enlisted, 1 cat.; Flag: 43 officers, 108 enlisted.; Troops: 80 officers, 1,146 enlisted
- Armament: 2 × single 5 inch/38 cal. dual purpose gun mounts, one fore and one aft.; 2 × twin 40mm AA gun mounts.; 2 × single 40mm AA gun mounts.; 18 × single 20mm AA gun mounts.

USS Fremont (APA-44) was a Bayfield-class attack transport that served with the US Navy during World War II.

Fremont was launched 31 March 1943 by Ingalls Shipbuilding, Pascagoula, Mississippi; as Sea Corsair, placed in partial commission between 30 May 1943 and 11 June 1943, and commissioned in full 23 November 1943.

== Operational history ==
=== Conversion to command ship ===
Fremont arrived at Pearl Harbor 14 March 1944 for conversion to a staff and command ship for amphibious operations, and during the remainder of the war was to carry such distinguished commanders as Rear Admiral William H. P. Blandy, Rear Admiral William M. Fechteler, Rear Admiral Ralph O. Davis, and Major General Graves B. Erskine, USMC.

=== Saipan ===
Fremont's first assault landing was at Saipan on 16 June, and for 10 days she lay off the island, landing troops and receiving casualties by day, and retiring seaward at night.

=== Palau Islands ===
Back in Pearl Harbor from 12 July 1944 to 12 August, Fremont sailed then for rehearsal landings in the Solomons, and on 8 September she sortied for the Palau Islands operation. During the initial landings on Peleliu 15 September, Fremont conducted a diversionary demonstration off Babelthaup, then moved into the transport area to land troops on Angaur 17 September. On 23 September Fremont landed men in the unopposed occupation of Ulithi, then returned to Hollandia and Manus for training with soldiers.

=== Casualties at Leyte ===
Fremont cleared Manus 12 October 1944 for the initial landings in Leyte Gulf 20 October, and remained in the Gulf until 18 November, embarking Admiral Fechteler as senior officer present afloat. She came under enemy air attack on several occasions, and on 24 October, during the decisive Battle for Leyte Gulf, a small caliber shell which exploded on her bridge injured seven men. Returning to Hollandia 22 November, Fremont embarked men and equipment for rehearsal landings in preparation for the assault on Luzon. During these exercises, Fremont aided in splashing a lone attacking aircraft.

=== Luzon ===
Arriving in Lingayen Gulf for the initial landings 9 January 1945, Fremont, with the job done, sailed 11 January for Leyte, then sailed on to Guam to embark Marines for the Iwo Jima operation.

=== Iwo Jima ===
Again combining her key services as command ship with skillful landing of troops, she arrived off Iwo Jima 19 February, put the Marine command party ashore 24 February, and began landing troops and cargo. She returned to Saipan 9 March with casualties and prisoners of war, then sailed for repairs and rehearsal landings off New Caledonia. On 16 May Fremont returned to Leyte Gulf with troops and sailors, and there received men for transportation to the west coast, where she began an overhaul 26 June 1945.

=== After hostilities ===
Two voyages to Pearl Harbor, and two more to Pacific islands and the Philippines to bring servicemen eligible for immediate discharge home kept Fremont at sea between 9 October 1945 and 12 August 1946. On 11 January 1947 she cleared Port Hueneme, California, to join the Atlantic Fleet at Norfolk, Virginia 26 January.

== Postwar career ==
In the years from 1947 through 1960, Fremont completed seven tours of duty with the 6th Fleet in the Mediterranean, participating in amphibious exercises with marines and ships of other NATO navies. The Lebanon Crisis broke out during her 1958 tour of duty, and she joined in landing Marines at Beirut 17 July to 6 August, returning to reembark troops in September.

While based at Norfolk Navy Yard in 1951, she prominently appeared in the film You're in the Navy Now.

Her operations when not deployed found Fremont taking part in amphibious operations from Labrador to the West Indies, and for much of each year, she trained marines along the North Carolina coast near Camp Lejeune, as well as in the Caribbean. In 1962, she served as the command ship of Amphibious Squadron Four, Task Force 61 before returning to Italy. In 1968, the Fremont was anchored at Miami, Florida, to serve as living quarters for some 200 federal agents and Army EOD operators providing security for the Republican National Convention as all hotel space was taken up by the convention. She sailed in 1969 for decommissioning at Portsmouth, Virginia.

Fremont received five battle stars for World War II service.
