= USS Knox (APA-46) =

US Navy transport ship

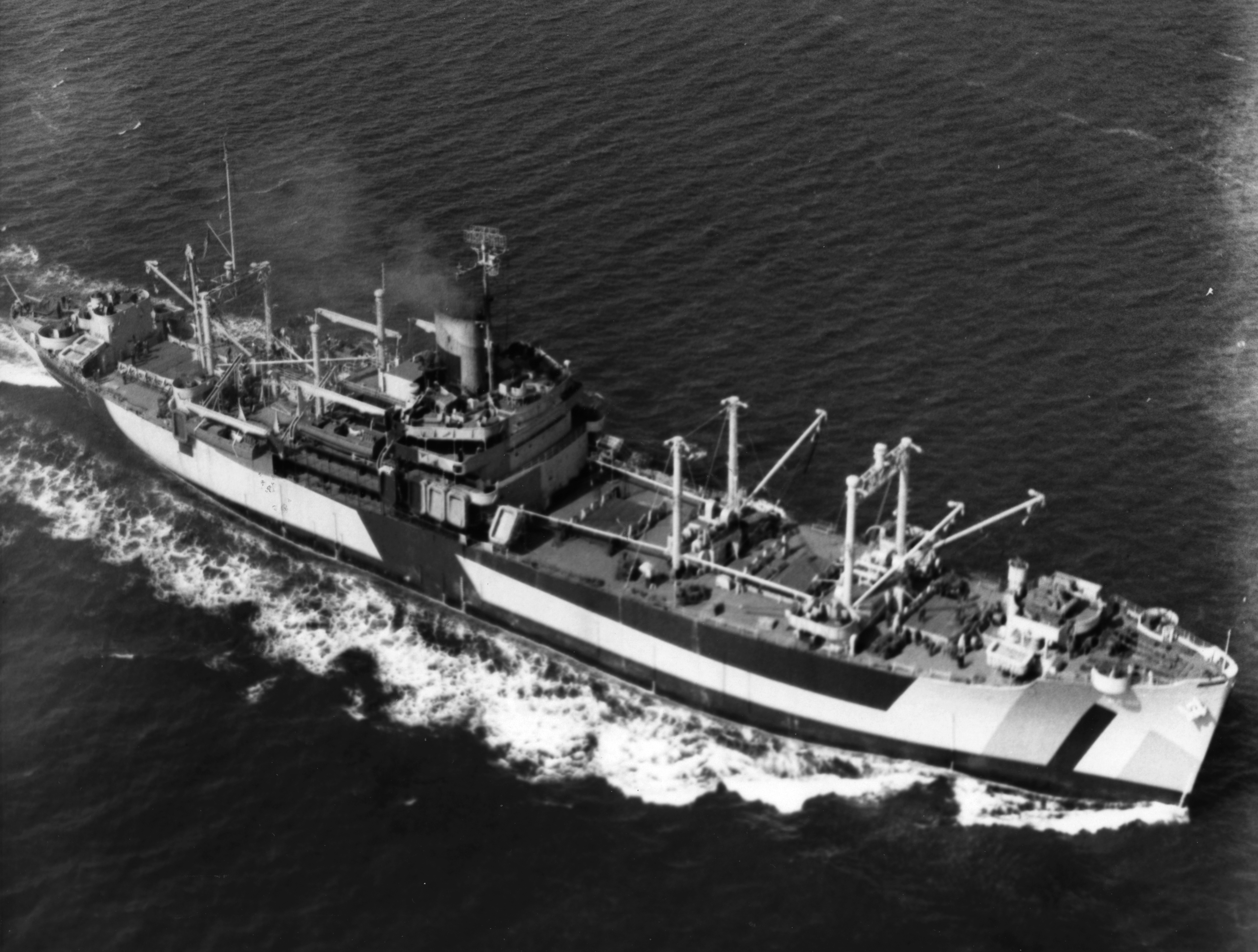

History

United States
- Name: USS Knox; (MC Hull No. 430)
- Namesake: Knox County, Illinois; Knox County, Indiana; Knox County, Kentucky; Knox County, Maine; Knox County, Missouri; Knox County, Nebraska; Knox County, Ohio; Knox County, Tennessee; Knox County, Texas
- Builder: Ingalls Shipbuilding
- Reclassified: AP-91 to APA-46, 1 February 1943
- Launched: 17 July 1943
- Sponsored by: Mrs. R. K. Forde
- Acquired: 30 September 1943
- Commissioned: 30 September 1943 (ferry)
- Decommissioned: 14 October 1943
- Refit: Conversion by Bethlehem Steel
- Commissioned: 4 March 1944 (full)
- Decommissioned: 14 March 1946
- Stricken: 1 May 1946
- Honors and awards: 5 battle stars, World War II
- Fate: Sold for commercial service, 1947; Scrapped, June 1971

General characteristics
- Class & type: Bayfield-class attack transport; (Type C3-S-A2)
- Displacement: 8,100 tons, 16,100 tons fully loaded
- Length: 492 ft (150 m)
- Beam: 69 ft 6 in (21.18 m)
- Draft: 26 ft 6 in (8.08 m)
- Propulsion: Westinghouse geared turbine, 2 x Foster Wheeler D-type boilers, single propeller, designed shaft horsepower 8,500
- Speed: 18 knots
- Boats & landing craft carried: 17 × LCVP; 2 × LCM (Mk-6).
- Capacity: 4,700 tons (175,000 cu. ft).
- Complement: Crew: 51 officers, 524 enlisted; Flag: 43 officers, 108 enlisted.; Troops: 80 officers, 1,146 enlisted
- Armament: 2 × single 5 inch/38 cal. dual purpose gun mounts, one fore and one aft; 2 × twin 40mm AA gun mounts; 2 × single 40mm AA gun mounts.; 18 × single 20mm AA gun mounts.

USS Knox (APA-46) was a Bayfield-class attack transport in service with the United States Navy from 1944 to 1946. in 1947, she was sold into commercial service and was finally scrapped in 1971.

== History ==
USS Knox was named for counties in Illinois, Indiana, Kentucky, Maine, Missouri, Nebraska, Ohio, Tennessee, and Texas. The vessel was laid down by Ingalls Shipbuilding under a Maritime Commission contract, and launched 17 July 1943, sponsored by Mrs. R.K. Forde. She was fitted out as an attack transport at Bethlehem Steel in Brooklyn, New York and commissioned as USS Knox (APA-46) on 4 March 1944. Knox was originally classified as troop transport AP-91 and re-classified APA-46 on 1 February 1943.

=== Pacific War ===
After shakedown, Knox departed Naval Base Norfolk on 6 April 1944 for the Pacific, arriving Pearl Harbor 23 April with U.S. Marines and Seabees embarked. Assigned to the 5th Amphibious Force, the transport sailed 29 May as part of Task Force 52 bound for the Marianas. Steaming via Eniwetok, Marshall Islands, Knox arrived off Saipan 15 June and made a diversionary landing at Garapan before debarking her troops that afternoon at the actual landing area. She remained off Saipan until 24 June, then sailed for Eniwetok, arriving the 28th with Saipan casualties on board.

Departing Eniwetok 15 July, she returned to Saipan 19 July to prepare for the assault on Tinian. With troops of the 2nd Marine Division embarked, she engaged in another amphibious diversion during the 24 July invasion of Tinian. She then landed her troops the next day and operated off Tinian and Saipan until she departed 28 July for Pearl Harbor via Eniwetok, arriving 10 August.

After completing amphibious exercises, Knox sailed 15 September for Manus Island, Admiralty Islands, where she arrived on 3 October 1944 to prepare for the long-awaited liberation of the Philippines. Loaded with United States Army troops and equipment, she departed Manus on 14 October in the Southern Attack Force (Task Force 79). The transport arrived off Dulag, Leyte, on 20 October and lowered boats for the first assault. Knox completed unloading under a smoke screen on 21 October and departed Leyte Gulf for New Guinea arriving at Hollandia on 26 October 1944.

Knox steamed out of Humboldt Bay on 5 November and returned to Leyte on 18 November after loading troops and cargo at Noemfoor, Schouten Islands, from 7 to 14 November 1944. From Leyte she proceeded the same day to Manus; and, arriving 24 November, began a month of landing exercises off Manus, New Britain, and New Guinea in preparation for the invasion of Luzon. Loaded with 1,278 U.S. Army troops, she departed Manus on 31 December 1944 for Lingayen Gulf, Luzon. Fighting through heavy enemy air attack, she reached Lingayen Gulf 9 January 1945, unloaded all troops and cargo within 8 hours, and headed back toward Leyte. While repelling air attacks 9 to 10 January, Knox hit two Japanese planes, shooting down one of them.

After arriving Leyte Gulf 12 January, Knox proceeded to Ulithi 19 to 23 January and thence to Guam 6 to 8 February to embark Marines of the 3rd Marine Division for the invasion of Iwo Jima. Departing on 17 February 1945, she arrived off Iwo Jima on 22 February and debarked her troops on the 24th as part of a reserve force. After embarking casualties and loading cargo, Knox departed on 6 March. Steaming via Saipan, Guam, and Tulagi, Solomon Islands, she reached Nouméa, New Caledonia, on 18 March. Following overhaul and landing exercises, she got underway on 3 May 1945 for the Philippines. Touching Manus en route, she arrived San Pedro Bay, Leyte, on 16 May and unloaded troops and cargo. On 25 May she sailed for the United States arriving Portland, Oregon, for overhaul on 14 June 1945.

Knox sailed from Portland to San Francisco, California (USA) from 14 to 16 August. After loading troops and cargo, she departed 18 August for the Philippines. Sailing via Pearl Harbor Eniwetok, Guam, and Ulithi, she reached Leyte Gulf 13 September. She operated among the Philippines until 1 October 1945; then she carried occupation troops to Japan between 1 and 29 October. Returning to Samar on 5 November, she embarked homebound veterans and sailed the 6th as a unit of Operation Magic Carpet. She arrived San Pedro, Los Angeles on 24 November 1945. After another "Magic Carpet" cruise to the Philippines from 7 December to 26 January 1946, she departed Long Beach, California on 31 January 1945 for New Orleans, Louisiana, where she arrived on 12 February.

=== Decommissioning and fate ===
Knox proceeded to Mobile, Alabama, on 6 March and was decommissioned on 14 March 1946. Her name was struck from the Navy List 1 May and she was transferred to the Maritime Commission on 14 May 1946. In 1947 Knox was sold to Isthmian Lines and renamed Steel Recorder. She was later sold on to States Marine Lines and named Constitution State. She was scrapped in Taiwan in 1971.

== Awards ==
Knox received five battle stars for World War II service.
