= USS Burleigh =

United States Navy Bayfield-class attack transport that served from 1944 to 1946

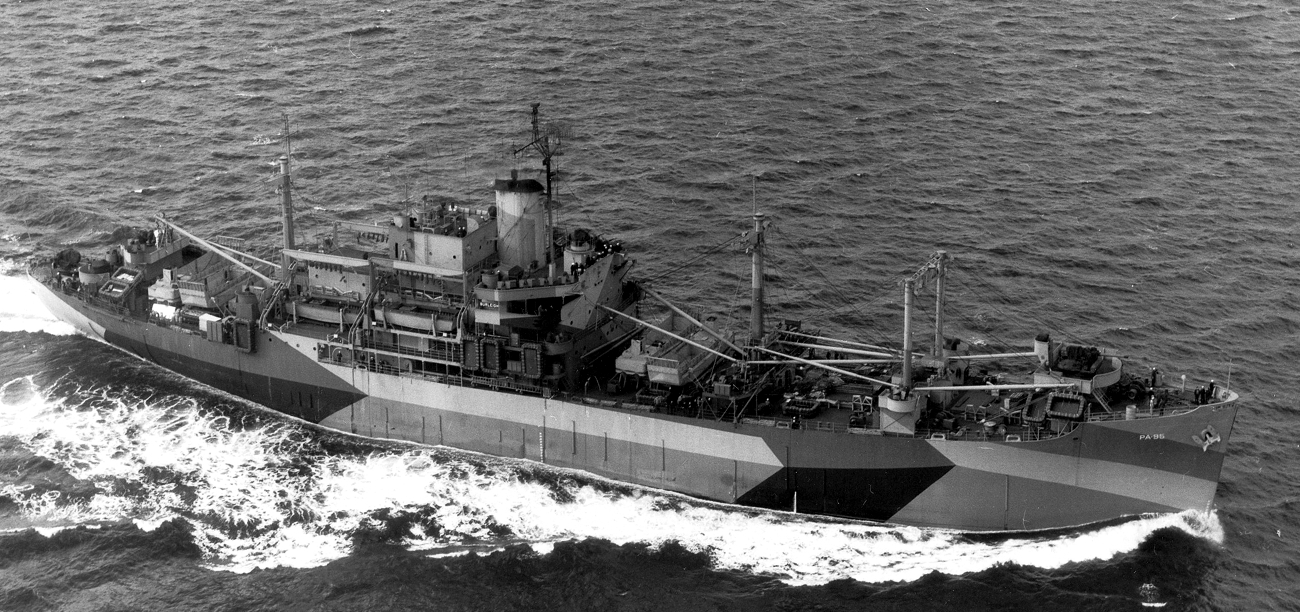

History

United States
- Name: Burleigh
- Namesake: A county in south central North Dakota. The state capital, Bismarck, is located within its boundaries.
- Builder: Ingalls Shipbuilding
- Laid down: 6 July 1943
- Launched: 3 December 1943
- Sponsored by: Mrs. Dallas H. Smith
- Christened: Sea Adder
- Commissioned: 30 October 1944
- Decommissioned: 11 June 1946
- Honors and awards: Two battle stars for service in World War II.
- Fate: Scrapped May 1973
- Notes: MC Hull No. 862

General characteristics
- Class & type: Bayfield-class attack transport
- Type: Type C3-S-A2.
- Displacement: 8,100 tons, 16,100 tons fully loaded
- Length: 492 ft (150 m)
- Beam: 69 ft 6 in (21.18 m)
- Draught: 26 ft 6 in (8.08 m)
- Propulsion: Westinghouse geared turbine, 2 × Foster Wheeler D-type boilers, single propeller, designed shaft horsepower 8,500
- Speed: 18 knots
- Boats & landing craft carried: 12 × LCVP, 4 × LCM (Mk-6), 3 × LCP(L) (MK-IV)
- Capacity: 4,800 tons (180,500 cu. ft).
- Troops: 80 officers, 1,146 enlisted
- Complement: Crew: 51 officers, 524 enlisted; Flag: 43 officers, 108 enlisted.
- Armament: 2 × single 5-inch/38 cal. dual-purpose gun mounts, one forward and one aft.; 2 × twin 40 mm AA gun mounts aft, port and starboard.; 18 × single 20 mm AA gun mounts.

USS Burleigh (APA-95) was a Bayfield-class attack transport that served with the United States Navy from 1944 to 1946. She was sold into commercial service in 1947 and was scrapped in 1973.

== History ==
Burleigh (named after Burleigh County, North Dakota), was launched on 3 December 1943 by Ingalls Shipbuilding, Pascagoula, Mississippi, under a Maritime Commission contract, and placed in reduced commission on 1 April 1944. She was taken to New York, and placed out of commission on 13 April for conversion by Bethlehem Steel, 56th Street Yard, Brooklyn, New York. The ship was placed in full commission on 30 October 1944.

=== Pacific War ===
On 3 December 1944 Burleigh departed Hampton Roads, Virginia, and proceeded to the Pacific, arriving at Pearl Harbor on 23 December. She became flagship of Transport Squadron 18 at San Francisco on 3 January 1945. During January and February, Burleigh transported passengers and supplies to Pearl Harbor, Guadalcanal, and the Russell Islands.

March 1945 was spent at Ulithi, Caroline Islands, in preparation for the assault on Okinawa. Burleigh departed Ulithi, in company with Transport Squadron 18, on 27 March, and arrived off Okinawa on 1 April. She remained in the area disembarking Marines and supplies until 10 April, when she got underway for Pearl Harbor. She arrived at Pearl Harbor on 27 April, after stopping at Guam to embark casualties.

Returning to San Francisco on 4 June, Burleigh embarked troops and supplies and steamed to Guam via Pearl Harbor, Eniwetok, and Saipan. She returned to San Francisco on 2 August.

=== Operation Magic Carpet ===
With the cessation of hostilities, Burleigh was assigned to the Operation Magic Carpet fleet returning veterans from the Pacific until March 1946.

=== Decommissioning and fate ===
On 15 March 1946 she departed the West Coast for Norfolk, Virginia, where she arrived in April. She was decommissioned on 11 June 1946 and returned to the Maritime Commission the following day.

On 26 June 1947, she was sold to the Matson Navigation Company and was renamed SS Hawaiian Pilot. On 14 July 1953 Hawaiian Pilot collided off San Francisco in fog with another C3 ship, the SS Jacob Luckenbach; the Jacob Luckenbach sank but the entire crew was saved by the Hawaiian Pilot. The damage to her bow was repaired.

She was again sold on 8 May 1961 to Oceanic Steamship Company, a Matson subsidiary, and was renamed SS Sonoma . On 21 January 1971, the ship was sold to Far East Line Inc. and finally on 17 March 1972 to Excelsior Marine Corporation and she was renamed SS Noma. She was sold for scrap in 1973.

== Awards ==
Burleigh received one battle star for her World War II service.
