= USS Lamar (APA-47) =

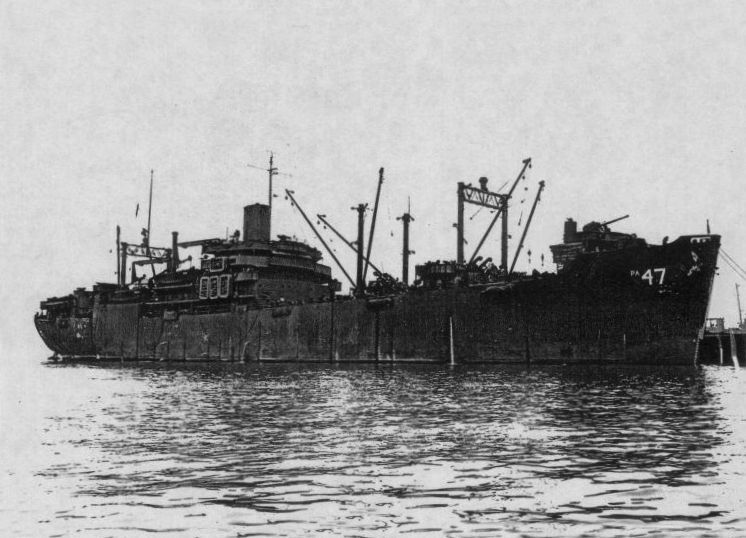

History

United States
- Name: USS Lamar
- Namesake: Lamar County, Alabama; Lamar County, Georgia; Lamar County, Mississippi; Lamar County, Texas
- Ordered: as C3-S-A2
- Builder: Ingalls Shipbuilding
- Laid down: 31 March 1943
- Launched: 28 August 1943
- Acquired: 10 November 1943
- Commissioned: 6 April 1944
- Decommissioned: 7 March 1946
- Stricken: 1 April 1946
- Honors and awards: 5 x battle stars for World War II service
- Fate: Scrapped, 1971

General characteristics
- Class & type: Bayfield-class attack transport
- Displacement: 7,845 tons
- Length: 492 ft (150 m)
- Beam: 69 ft 6 in (21.18 m)
- Draft: 26 ft 6 in (8.08 m)
- Speed: 18.4 kn (34.1 km/h)
- Complement: 581
- Armament: two 5 in (130 mm) guns, four 40 mm gun mounts., eighteen 20 mm gun machine guns

USS Lamar (APA-47) was a Bayfield-class attack transport in service with the United States Navy from 1943 to 1946. She was sold into commercial service in 1948 and was scrapped in 1971.

== History ==
Lamar (AP-92) was reclassified APA-47 on 1 February 1943; laid down 31 March 1943 by Ingalls Shipbuilding Corp., Pascagoula, Mississippi, under a Maritime Commission contract; launched 28 August 1943; sponsored by Mrs. James Oliver Eastland, wife of Senator Eastland of Mississippi; acquired by the Navy 9 November 1943; placed in ferry commission 10 November for transfer to Brooklyn, New York, decommissioned 22 November 1943 for conversion by Todd-Erie Basin, Brooklyn; and commissioned 6 April 1944.

=== Pacific War ===
After steaming to Norfolk, Virginia, 16 to 17 April for shakedown, Lamar embarked 1,621 U.S. Marines, and departed 13 May for the Pacific Ocean. The attack transport reached Pearl Harbor 1 June, sailed for the U.S. West Coast 5 June, visited San Diego, and Seattle, Washington, and arrived Pearl Harbor 26 June to deploy troops to the Marianas. Departing in convoy 1 July, she steamed via Eniwetok to Guam, where she debarked 1,445 troops 21 July.

After returning to Pearl Harbor 10 August, Lamar held landing rehearsals off Maui Island to prepare for the invasion of the Philippines. As flagship for TransDiv 38, she steamed to Manus, Admiralties, 15 September to 3 October and joined the U.S. 7th Fleet. From 14 to 20 October she sailed in convoy to Leyte Gulf for the long-awaited reconquest of the Philippines. While debarking assault troops and unloading cargo at Dulag under cover of smoke, she fought off enemy air attacks, and on the 21st splashed a Japanese bomber. That day Lamar sailed for Hollandia, New Guinea; arrived Hollandia 26 October; embarked troops at Biak and Mios Woendi; and returned to Leyte Gulf 18 November with reinforcements and cargo.

She departed the same day, touched Manus, and reached Bougainville, Solomons, 1 December. She took on board troops and cargo before returning to Manus 21 December to prepare for the Luzon invasion. Sailing 31 December with task group TG 79.1, she entered Lingayen Gulf 9 January 1945 and began debarking combat troops. Despite frequent alerts and intermittent air attacks, the transport completed unloading the 11th and departed for Leyte, where she arrived 14 January. She returned to the western coast of Luzon 29 January to debark American engineers and troops at San Narciso.

From 1 February to 27 March Lamar operated out of Leyte Gulf in preparation for Operation Iceberg, the invasion of Okinawa. On 27 March she departed the Philippines with 1,366 assault troops embarked. Assigned to task group TG 55.1, she reached Okinawa 1 April and completed landing men and cargo the next day. She embarked battle wounded; transported them to Guam 4 to 9 April; then sailed the 10th for San Francisco, arriving 29 April.

=== Operation Magic Carpet ===
Departing San Francisco 22 May, Lamar deployed passengers and cargo to Pearl Harbor and Ulithi before reaching Guiuan, Samar, 23 June. From 27 June to 14 July she served as receiving ship for ServRon 10. After loading cargo at Guiuan, she steamed to Pearl Harbor 19 July to 1 August; discharged cargo; and departed the following day for San Francisco where she arrived the 9th. After repairs at Seattle, Lamar sailed 8 September for the Marianas, reaching Guam 24 September. She discharged 1,517 military passengers, embarked 1,829 returning veterans, and steamed to San Diego, 28 September to 12 October. On the 28th she departed for Japan on "Operation Magic Carpet" duty. Arriving Yokosuka 28 November, she embarked 1,810 passengers before sailing 1 December for Seattle, Washington, where she arrived the 14th via the North Pacific.

=== Decommissioning and fate ===
On 14 January 1946 Lamar departed Puget Sound for the U.S. Gulf Coast, arriving New Orleans, Louisiana, 3 February. She proceeded to Beaumont, Texas, 23 to 24 February, decommissioned 7 March, and was turned over to the Maritime Commission 3 July 1946. Lamar was purchased by the Luckenbach Steamship Corporation at Baltimore, Maryland on 19 January 1949, for $55,713.00, and was renamed SS J.L. Luckenbach. In July 1959, she was sold to Global Bulk Transportation Corporation and renamed SS Evergreen State. On 27 May 1971, she was sold for scrapping in Taiwan to Tung Ho Steel Enterprise Corporation.

== Awards ==
Lamar received five battle stars for World War II service.
