= USS Fayette =

United States Navy vessel

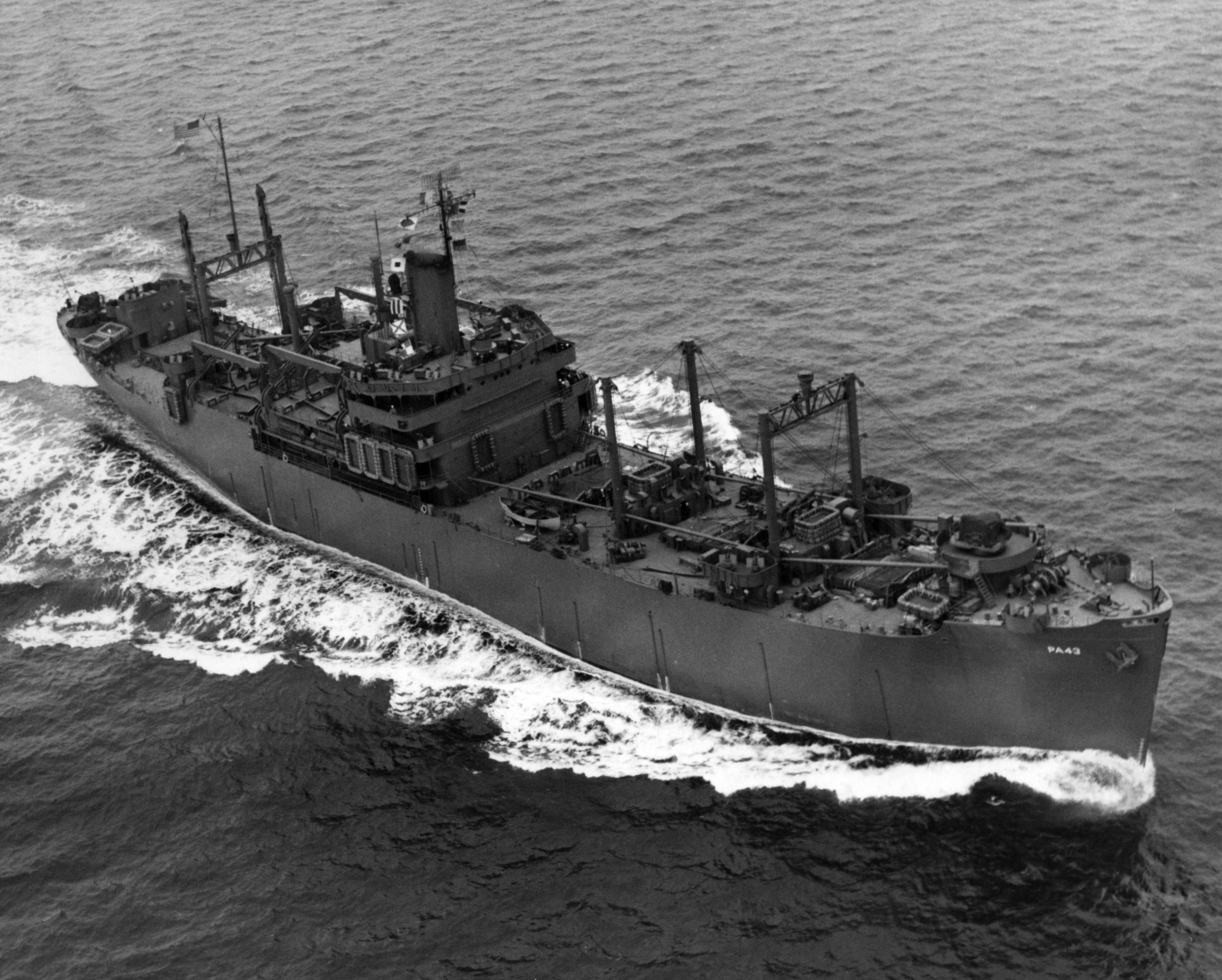
- USS Fayette (APA-43)

History

United States
- Name: USS Fayette
- Namesake: Fayette County, Alabama; Fayette County, Georgia; Fayette County, Illinois; Fayette County, Indiana; Fayette County, Iowa; Fayette County, Kentucky; Fayette County, Ohio; Fayette County, Pennsylvania; Fayette County, Tennessee; Fayette County, Texas; Fayette County, Virginia; Fayette County, West Virginia
- Builder: Ingalls Shipbuilding
- Laid down: Unknown
- Launched: 25 February 1943
- Christened: Sea Hawk.
- Commissioned: 14 October 1943
- Decommissioned: 6 March 1946
- Renamed: USS Fayette, Robin Gray, Gray.
- Reclassified: AP-88 to APA-43 (1 February 1943).
- Honours and awards: Six battle stars for service in World War II.
- Fate: Scrapped, 1972.
- Notes: MC Hull No. 391.; Type C3-S-A2.; Sponsor: Mrs. H. L. Vickery.

General characteristics
- Class & type: Bayfield-class attack transport
- Displacement: 8,100 tons, 16,100 tons fully loaded
- Length: 492 ft (150 m)
- Beam: 69 ft 6 in (21.18 m)
- Draft: 26 ft 6 in (8.08 m)
- Propulsion: General Electric geared turbine, 2 x Foster Wheeler D-type boilers, single propeller, designed shaft horsepower 8,500
- Speed: 18 knots
- Boats & landing craft carried: 12 x LCVP, 4 x LCM (Mk-6), 3 x LCP(L) (MK-IV)
- Capacity: 4,700 tons (175,000 cu. ft).
- Complement: Crew: 51 officers, 524 enlisted; Flag: 43 officers, 108 enlisted.; Troops: 80 officers, 1,146 enlisted
- Armament: 2 × single 5 inch/38 cal. dual purpose gun mounts, one fore and one aft.; 2 × twin 40mm AA gun mounts.; 2 × single 40mm AA gun mounts.; 18 × single 20mm AA gun mounts.

USS Fayette (APA-43) was a Bayfield-class attack transport that served with the United States Navy from 1943 to 1946. In 1947, she was sold into commercial service, where she served as SS Robin Gray until being scrapped in 1972.

== History ==
Fayette was launched 25 February 1943 by Ingalls Shipbuilding, Pascagoula, Mississippi, as Sea Hawk; acquired by the Navy 30 April; placed in ferry commission between 30 April and 14 May; and commissioned in full 14 October 1943. She embarked marines at Norfolk, Virginia for transportation to Pearl Harbor, where she arrived 21 December 1943.

=== Kwajalein ===
After training, she embarked soldiers, and sailed from Honolulu 22 January 1944 for Kwajalein, where she landed her troops on 1 February, one day after the initial assault. For 4 days, she offloaded combat cargo, and acted as receiving ship for casualties whom she transferred to a hospital ship before sailing 5 February for Funafuti.

=== Marianas ===
After training in landing exercises at Nouméa, Fayette redeployed Marines and soldiers between March and May 1944, calling at Guadalcanal, Kwajalein, Cape Gloucester, and in the Russell Islands on this duty before sailing from Kwajalein 12 June for the assault on the Marianas. With her troops destined for Guam, she was called back to Eniwetok when the invasion was delayed, and sortied once more 17 July for Guam. Fayette sent her boats away with assault troops 21 July, then received casualties from the shore for 4 days, returning with them to Espiritu Santo 5 August.

=== Palaus ===
In the Russells, Fayette loaded troops and rehearsed for the assault of the Palaus. She arrived off Peleliu for the initial landings 15 September 1944, and within 5 days was loaded to capacity with wounded from the bitter fighting ashore. These she carried to Manus, then sailed on to New Guinea to prepare for the liberation of the Philippines.

=== Leyte ===
Fayette landed her troops at Leyte 20 October, and before the Battle for Leyte Gulf exploded, sailed for Humboldt Bay and Morotai to load reinforcements.

Fayette twice fired to drive off Japanese air attacks before clearing Morotai 10 November 1944 for San Pedro Bay, P.I., where she arrived and unloaded 14 November.

=== Lingayen Gulf ===
Returning to Manus and Aitape to replenish, reload troops, and rehearse landings, Fayette sailed from New Guinea 28 December for Lingayen Gulf. The task force in which she sailed met a variety of resistance from the Japanese, and Fayette joined in the general barrage which drove a dive-bomber off before it could strike a nearby battleship on the morning of the landings, 9 January 1945. Unloaded by mid-afternoon, she fired to fight off several dusk attacks on the transport area, and the next day sailed for Leyte Gulf, firing several times to drive off air attacks.

=== Iwo Jima ===
After 6 days at Leyte, Fayette sailed to replenish at Ulithi and to embark Marines at Guam. These she landed at Iwo Jima as reinforcements 24 February 1945, then sailed with casualties for Tulagi and Nouméa. There she loaded soldiers, and began a period of training during which she was in reserve for the Okinawa invasion. With her troops not required there, she carried them to the Philippines, and sailed from Leyte 25 May for a west coast overhaul which lasted through the close of the war.

=== After hostilities ===
Fayette voyaged to the Far East between 28 August 1945 and 13 November 1945, carrying out occupation troops, and returning with servicemen eligible for discharge. Similar duty took her to Pearl Harbor, Guam, and Saipan between 28 November and 17 January 1946. From the west coast she sailed to Mobile, Alabama, where she was decommissioned and placed in reserve 6 March 1946. Fayette was transferred to the Maritime Commission 19 April 1946.

Fayette received six battle stars for World War II service.

== Commercial service ==
Fayette was sold for commercial service in 1947 and renamed SS Robin Gray. In 1971, she was renamed SS Grey. She was scrapped at Kaohsiung, Taiwan in 1972.
