= USS DuPage (APA-41) =

US WW2-era vessel

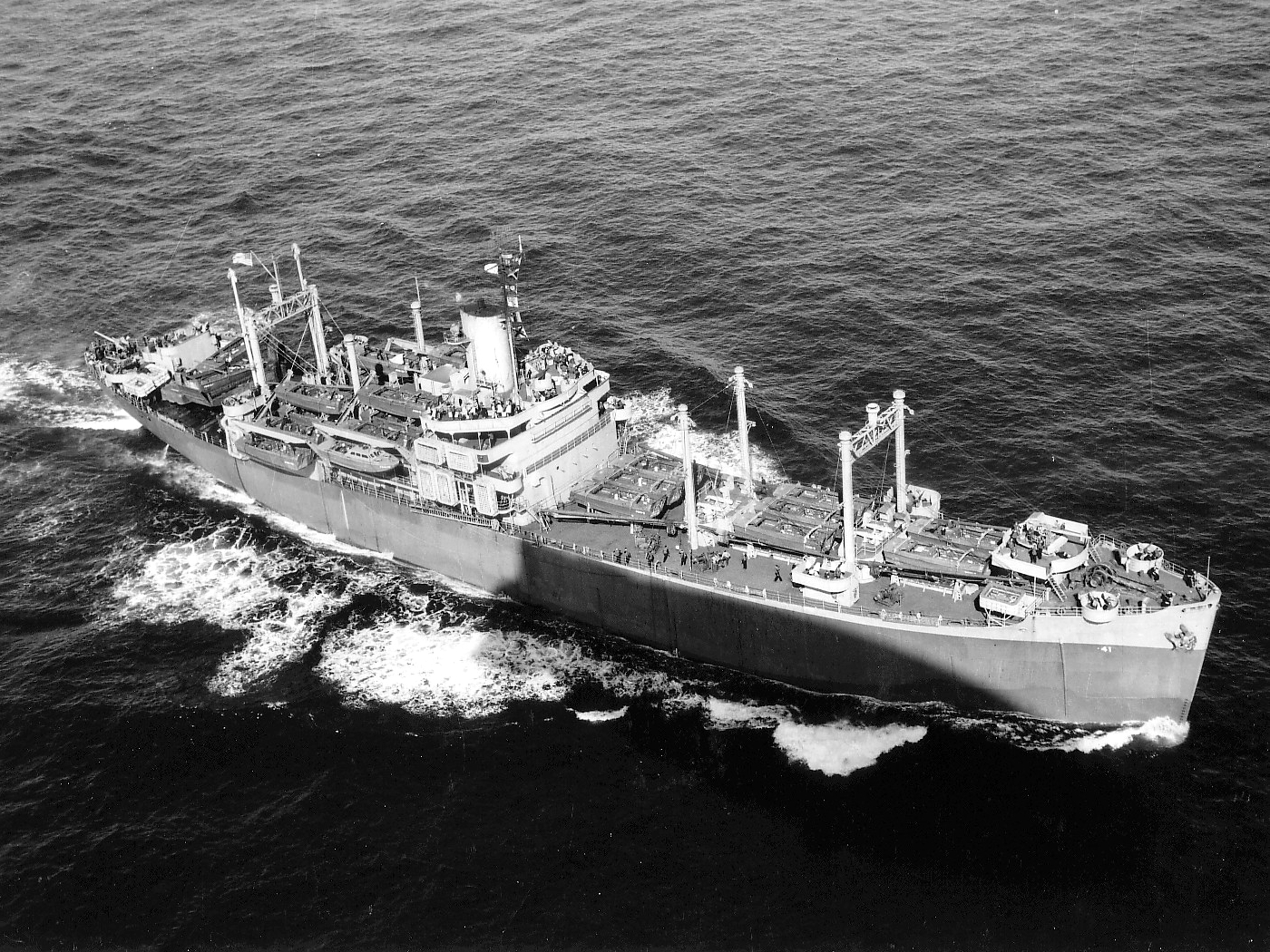

History

United States
- Name: USS DuPage
- Namesake: DuPage County, Illinois
- Builder: Ingalls Shipbuilding, Pascagoula, Mississippi
- Launched: 19 December 1942, as Sea Hound (AP-86)
- Commissioned: 1 September 1943
- Decommissioned: 28 March 1946
- Reclassified: APA-41, 1 February 1943
- Honors and awards: 6 battle stars (World War II)
- Fate: Scrapped, 1973

General characteristics
- Class & type: Bayfield-class attack transport
- Displacement: 7,845 long tons (7,971 t)
- Length: 491 ft 8 in (149.86 m)
- Beam: 69 ft 6 in (21.18 m)
- Draft: 26 ft 6 in (8.08 m)
- Speed: 17 knots (31 km/h; 20 mph)
- Complement: 540
- Armament: 2 × 5"/38 caliber guns

USS DuPage (AP-86/APA-41) was a Bayfield-class attack transport in service with the United States Navy from 1943 to 1946. She was then sold into commercial service and was scrapped in 1973.

== History ==
DuPage was named for DuPage County, Illinois and was launched on 19 December 1942 as Sea Hound (AP-86) by Ingalls Shipbuilding Co., Pascagoula, Mississippi, under a Maritime Commission contract; sponsored by Mrs. Leigh R. Sanford; reclassified APA-41 on 1 February 1943; placed in ferry commission on 28 February 1943, decommissioned on 17 March 1943 for conversion by Todd-Erie Basin Dry Docks, Brooklyn, N.Y.; and recommissioned on 1 September 1943.

=== Pacific War ===
DuPage reached San Diego, California, from Norfolk, Virginia on 2 November 1943 to serve as flagship for a transport division during training. She sailed from San Diego on 13 January 1944 carrying U.S. Marines for the assault landings on Kwajalein, where she remained from 31 January to 6 February. DuPage sailed by way of Funafuti, Ellice Islands, to Guadalcanal, arriving on 18 February.

Based at Guadalcanal DuPage served in the redeployment of troops in the Solomons and carried troops for the assault landings on Emirau Island on 11 April 1944 and the support landings at Cape Gloucester, New Britain, from 28 April to 1 May. On 3 June she got underway for the invasion of Guam, landing her troops from 21 to 26 July. After evacuating casualties to Eniwetok, and exercising off Espiritu Santo, DuPage returned to Guadalcanal on 27 August to replenish, overhaul her landing craft, and train for the invasion of the Palau Islands.

DuPage sortied from Guadalcanal on 8 September 1944 and landed her troops in the assault of Peleliu a week later. For 12 days she remained in the area providing logistics support for landing craft and small patrol vessels. Three of her own landing craft were lost and one man killed during the bitter fighting.

Arriving at Hollandia, New Guinea on 30 September, DuPage prepared for the invasion of the Philippines. She carried U.S. Army troops for the initial landings at Leyte on 20 October and sailed at once to bring reinforcements from Hollandia for support landings on 14 November.

After rehearsal landings in New Guinea, DuPage sailed from Aitape on 28 December 1944 for the invasion of Lingayen Gulf, landing her troops on the beaches near San Fabian on 9 January 1945 and embarking casualties from the beach and other ships.

On the evening of the next day while DuPage was preparing to leave the area, enemy aircraft attacked. Despite heavy anti-aircraft fire, a kamikaze crashed to port damaging her severely as well as starting fires which stubbornly recurred and were fought all through the night. She lost 35 killed and 136 wounded; five men who were blown over the side were picked up by escorting destroyers. Despite her injuries DuPage continued to fulfill her duty as guide ship and arrived safely at Leyte three days later to transfer her casualties and undergo emergency repairs.

After landing troops at Zambales, Luzon on 29 January 1945, DuPage left San Pedro Bay on 11 February and embarking U.S. Marines at Manus and Pearl Harbor en route, arrived at San Francisco on 10 March for overhaul and battle damage repairs. She sailed from Alameda on 14 May to embark troops at Seattle, Washington, for Pearl Harbor.

She continued to Eniwetok for amphibious exercises, then transported troops and cargo from Ulithi to Okinawa, arriving on 5 July. Three days later she sailed with combat-tested U.S. Marines for Guam, then continued to Eniwetok and San Francisco where she arrived on 28 July. After minor alterations she was designated as flagship for Transport Division 63 and sailed on 12 August with U.S. Army Air Force personnel whom she disembarked at San Pedro Bay, Leyte on 5 September.

DuPage sailed from Lingayen Gulf on 1 October 1945 with troops for the occupation of Japan, landing her passengers at Nagoya on 26 October. Three days later she was assigned to "Magic Carpet" duty and made two voyages between Guam and the west coast to return veterans until 5 January 1946 when she arrived at Portland, Oregon.

=== Decommissioning and fate ===
Two weeks later she got underway for the east coast, arriving at New York on 7 February. DuPage was decommissioned on 28 March 1946 and transferred to the War Shipping Administration for disposal on 27 June 1946. The ship was acquired by Pope and Talbot Steamship Company in 1946 and rename the SS P&T Pathfinder. In 1957, she became SS Mormacsun of Moore-McCormack, in 1964 SS Green Port of Central Gulf Lines, and in 1967 SS Pine Tree State of States-Marine Line. She was sold for scrapping on 7 May 1973 to Li Chong Steel & Iron Works, Ltd. at Kaohsiung, Taiwan.

== Awards ==
DuPage received six battle stars for World War II service.
