= Ingalls Shipbuilding =

Shipyard in Pascagoula, Mississippi

Coordinates: 30.347371°N 88.575017°W

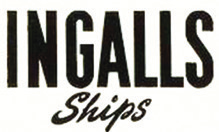
Historical Ingalls Shipbuilding logo

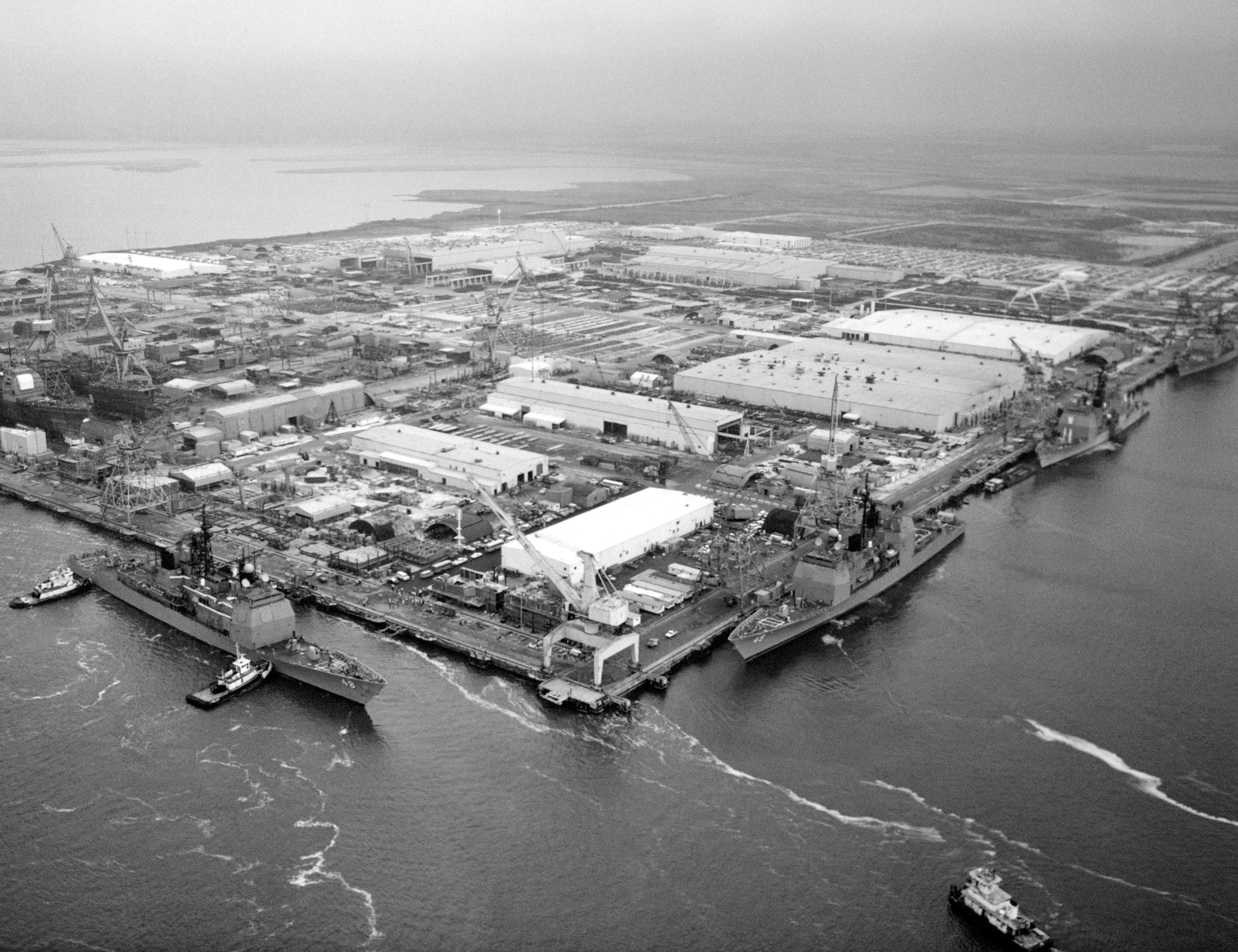
Aerial view of Ingalls Shipbuilding in 1985. Visible in this photo are (pierside, left to right): USS Yorktown, USS Vincennes, USS Valley Forge and USS Bunker Hill. Under construction on shore are USS Mobile Bay and USS Antietam.

Ingalls Shipbuilding is a shipyard located in Pascagoula, Mississippi, United States, originally established in 1938, and now part of HII. It is a producer of ships for the United States Navy, and, as of 2023, is the largest private employer in Mississippi.

== History ==
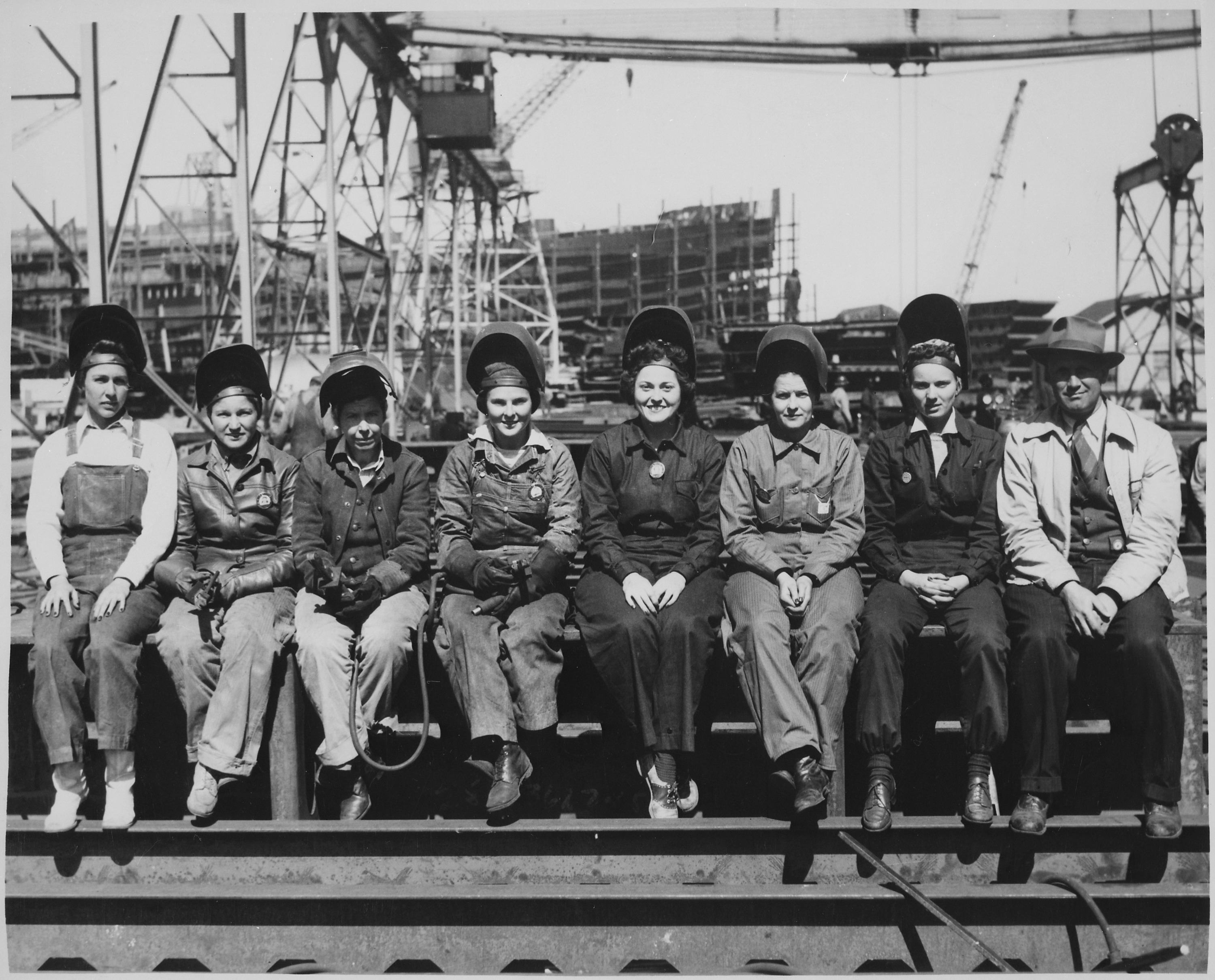
Female welders at Ingalls Shipbuilding, 1943

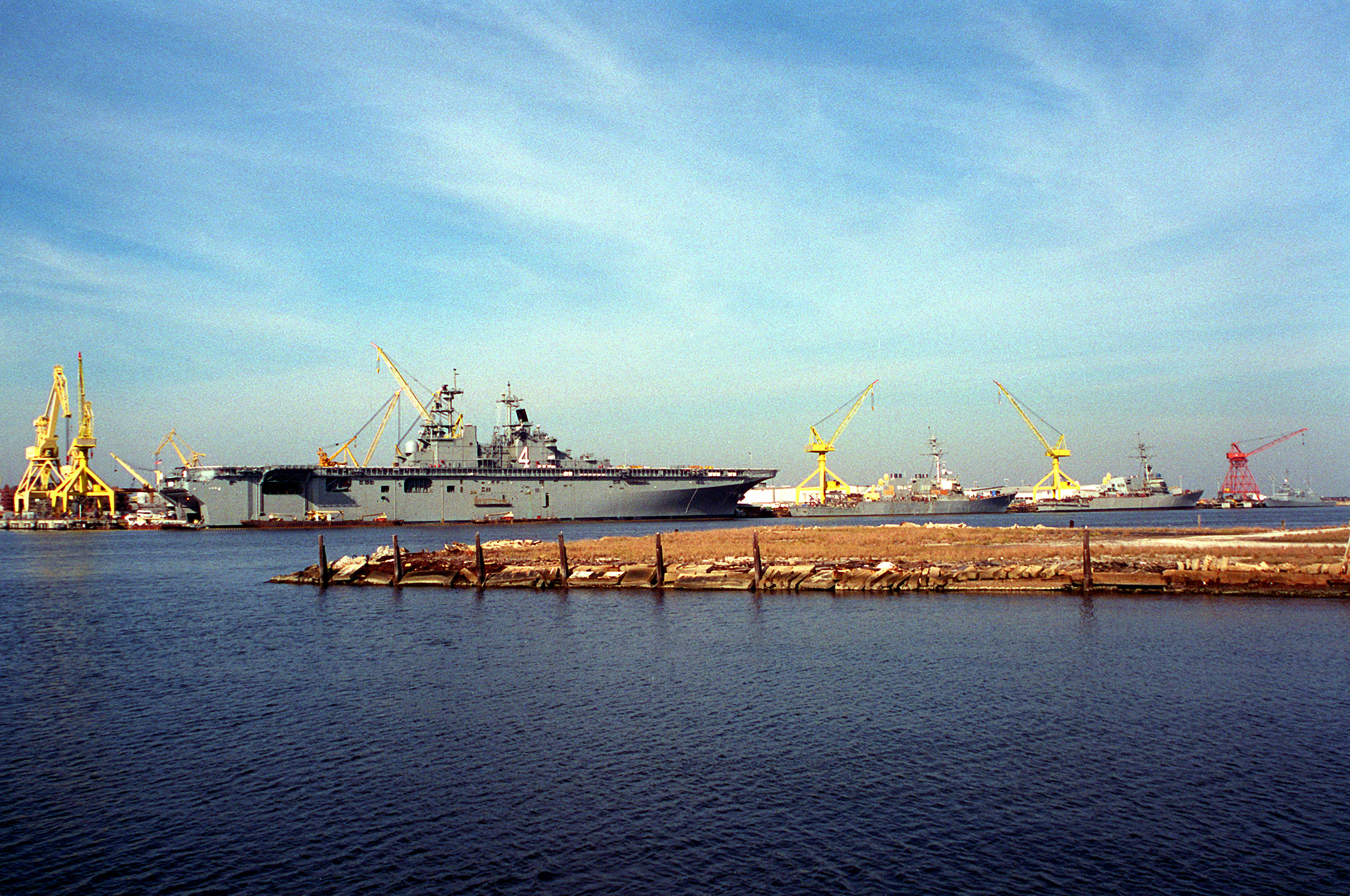
A view of a section of the Ingalls Shipbuilding Company showing various United States Navy ships under construction: Pictured are (from left to right): USS Boxer, USS Ramage, USS Benfold, and the Israeli guided-missile corvette, INS Hanit.

In 1938, Ingalls Shipbuilding Corporation was founded by Robert Ingersoll Ingalls Sr. (1882–1951) of Birmingham, Alabama, on the east bank of the Pascagoula River in Mississippi. Ingalls was located where the Pascagoula River runs into the Gulf of Mexico. It started out building commercial ships, including USS George Clymer, which took part in Liberty Fleet Day on 27 September 1941. In the 1950s, Ingalls started bidding on Navy work, winning a contract in 1957 to build 12 nuclear-powered attack submarines.

Litton Industries acquired Ingalls in 1961, and in 1968, expanded its facilities to the other side of the river. Ingalls reached a high point of employment in 1977, with 27,280 workers. In April 2001, Litton was acquired by the Northrop Grumman Corporation.

On 29 August 2005, Ingalls facilities were damaged by Hurricane Katrina; most of the ships in dock and construction escaped serious harm. While shipbuilding was halted for a while due to the destruction of many buildings, most vehicles and the large overhead cranes are the same that the facility continues to operate today.

On 31 March 2011, Northrop Grumman spun off its shipbuilding sector (including Ingalls Shipbuilding) into a new corporation, Huntington Ingalls Industries.

In 2015, Ingalls Shipbuilding Company signed a contract with US Navy for new destroyers, littoral combat ships, and new landing craft. USS John Finn was one of the first new destroyers and was launched on 28 March. The company is also building the USS Ralph Johnson, USS Paul Ignatius, and USS Delbert D. Black.

On 21 March 2015, the new San Antonio-class amphibious transport dock ship USS John P. Murtha was ceremonially christened. The vessel was launched on 30 October and was commissioned in 2017.

On 27 March 2015, the shipyard received construction contracts for their next destroyers. Ingalls Shipbuilding Company was awarded a $604.3 million contract modification for building USS Frank E. Petersen Jr..

On 31 March 2015, the shipyard also received another contract with a $500 million fixed price to build the eighth National Security Cutter for the US Coast Guard. Most of them will be under construction until 2019. The cutters are the most advanced ships ever built for the Coast Guard.

On 30 June 2016, Ingalls Shipbuilding signed a contract with US Navy to build the U.S. Navy's next large-deck amphibious-assault warship. The contract included planning, advanced engineering, and procurement of long-lead material, is just over $272 million. If options are exercised, the cumulative value of the contract would be $3.1 billion.

== Products ==
Ingalls' primary product has been naval ships and naval projects for Egypt, Israel, and Venezuela. In the 1940s, Ingalls attempted to enter the diesel-electric locomotive market. They cataloged an extensive product line, but only one example, known as the model 4-S, was produced. It was sold to the Gulf, Mobile & Ohio Railroad. Ingalls also manufactured covered hopper railroad cars in the early 1980s, producing around 4,000 units, primarily for the lease market via North American Car.

=== Ships built ===
Ships built by Ingalls include:

==== Submarines ====
- Barbel class:
  - USS Blueback (SS-581)
- Skipjack class:
  - USS Sculpin (SSN-590)
  - USS Snook (SSN-592)
- Thresher/Permit class:
  - USS Barb (SSN-596)
  - USS Dace (SSN-607)
  - USS Haddock (SSN-621)
- Sturgeon class:
  - USS Tautog (SSN-639)
  - USS Pogy (SSN-647)
  - USS Aspro (SSN-648)
  - USS Puffer (SSN-652)
  - USS William H. Bates (SSN-680)
  - USS Tunny (SSN-682)
  - USS Parche (SSN-683)

==== Destroyers ====
- Forrest Sherman class:
  - USS Morton (DD-948)
  - USS Parsons (DD-949/DDG-33)
- Spruance class:
  - USS Spruance (DD-963)
  - USS Paul F. Foster (DD-964)
  - USS Kinkaid (DD-965)
  - USS Hewitt (DD-966)
  - USS Elliot (DD-967)
  - USS Arthur W. Radford (DD-968)
  - USS Peterson (DD-969)
  - USS Caron (DD-970)
  - USS David R. Ray (DD-971)
  - USS Oldendorf (DD-972)
  - USS John Young (DD-973)
  - USS Comte de Grasse (DD-974)
  - USS O'Brien (DD-975)
  - USS Merrill (DD-976)
  - USS Briscoe (DD-977)
  - USS Stump (DD-978)
  - USS Conolly (DD-979)
  - USS Moosbrugger (DD-980)
  - USS John Hancock (DD-981)
  - USS Nicholson (DD-982)
  - USS John Rodgers (DD-983)
  - USS Leftwich (DD-984)
  - USS Cushing (DD-985)
  - USS Harry W. Hill (DD-986)
  - USS O'Bannon (DD-987)
  - USS Thorn (DD-988)
  - USS Deyo (DD-989)
  - USS Ingersoll (DD-990)
  - USS Fife (DD-991)
  - USS Fletcher (DD-992)
  - USS Hayler (DD-997)
- Kidd class:
  - USS Kidd (DD-993)
  - USS Callaghan (DD-994)
  - USS Scott (DD-995)
  - USS Chandler (DD-996)
- Arleigh Burke class:
  - USS Barry (DDG-52)
  - USS Stout (DDG-55)
  - USS Mitscher (DDG-57)
  - USS Russell (DDG-59)
  - USS Ramage (DDG-61)
  - USS Stethem (DDG-63)
  - USS Benfold (DDG-65)
  - USS Cole (DDG-67)
  - USS Milius (DDG-69)
  - USS Ross (DDG-71)
  - USS McFaul (DDG-74)
  - USS Porter (DDG-78)
  - USS Roosevelt (DDG-80)
  - USS Lassen (DDG-82)
  - USS Bulkeley (DDG-84)
  - USS Shoup (DDG-86)
  - USS Preble (DDG-88)
  - USS Mustin (DDG-89)
  - USS Pinckney (DDG-91)
  - USS Chung-Hoon (DDG-93)
  - USS James E. Williams (DDG-95)
  - USS Halsey (DDG-97)
  - USS Forrest Sherman (DDG-98)
  - USS Kidd (DDG-100)
  - USS Truxtun (DDG-103)
  - USS Dewey (DDG-105)
  - USS Gravely (DDG-107)
  - USS William P. Lawrence (DDG-110)
  - USS John Finn (DDG-113)
  - USS Ralph Johnson (DDG-114)
  - USS Paul Ignatius (DDG-117)
  - USS Delbert D. Black (DDG-119)
  - USS Frank E. Petersen Jr. (DDG-121)
  - USS Lenah H. Sutcliffe Higbee (DDG-123)
  - USS Jack H. Lucas (DDG-125)
  - USS Ted Stevens (DDG-128)

==== Cruisers ====
- Ticonderoga class:
  - USS Ticonderoga (CG-47)
  - USS Yorktown (CG-48)
  - USS Vincennes (CG-49)
  - USS Valley Forge (CG-50)
  - USS Bunker Hill (CG-52)
  - USS Mobile Bay (CG-53)
  - USS Antietam (CG-54)
  - USS Leyte Gulf (CG-55)
  - USS San Jacinto (CG-56)
  - USS Lake Champlain (CG-57)
  - USS Princeton (CG-59)
  - USS Chancellorsville (CG-62)
  - USS Chosin (CG-65)
  - USS Hué City (CG-66)
  - USS Anzio (CG-68)
  - USS Vicksburg (CG-69)
  - USS Cape St. George (CG-71)
  - USS Vella Gulf (CG-72)
  - USS Port Royal (CG-73)

==== Cutters ====
- Legend class:
  - USCGC Bertholf (WMSL 750)
  - USCGC Waesche (WMSL 751)
  - USCGC Stratton (WMSL 752)
  - USCGC Hamilton (WMSL 753)
  - USCGC James (WMSL 754)
  - USCGC Munro (WMSL 755)
  - USCGC Kimball (WMSL 756)
  - USCGC Midgett (WMSL-757)

==== Amphibious transport dock ====
- San Antonio class:
  - USS Mesa Verde (LPD-19)
  - USS San Diego (LPD-22)
  - USS Arlington (LPD-24)
  - USS John P. Murtha (LPD-26)
  - USS Portland (LPD-27)
  - USS Fort Lauderdale (LPD-28)
  - USS Richard M. McCool Jr. (LPD-29)

==== Amphibious assault ship ====
- Iwo Jima class:
  - USS Tripoli (LPH-10)
  - USS Inchon (LPH-12)
- Tarawa class:
  - USS Tarawa (LHA-1)
  - USS Saipan (LHA-2)
  - USS Belleau Wood (LHA-3)
  - USS Nassau (LHA-4)
  - USS Peleliu (LHA-5)
- Wasp class:
  - USS Wasp (LHD-1)
  - USS Essex (LHD-2)
  - USS Kearsarge (LHD-3)
  - USS Boxer (LHD-4)
  - USS Bataan (LHD-5)
  - USS Bonhomme Richard (LHD-6)
  - USS Iwo Jima (LHD-7)
  - USS Makin Island (LHD-8)
- America class:
  - USS America (LHA-6)
  - USS Tripoli (LHA-7)
  - USS Bougainville (LHA-8)

==== Attack transport ====
- Bayfield-class attack transports
  - Custer
  - DuPage
  - Elmore
  - Fayette
  - Fremont
  - Henrico
  - Knox
  - Lamar
  - Burleigh
  - Dade
  - Mendocino
  - Montour
  - Riverside
  - Westmoreland
  - Griggs
  - Grundy
  - Guilford
  - Sitka
  - Hamblen
  - Hampton
  - Hanover

==== Corvette ====
- Sa'ar 5 class:
  - INS Eilat (501)
  - INS Lahav (502)
  - INS Hanit (503)

==== Tankers ====
T5 tanker prototype, 615-foot vessel intended for possible conversion to atomic power, 1958

==== Cruise ships and ocean liners ====
- SS Del Norte for naval architect George G. Sharp, 1946
- SS Del Sud & SS Del Mar for the Delta Line, 1947
- SS Brasil (1957), an ocean liner for Moore-MacCormack and launched in 1957.
- SS Argentina (1958), also built for Moore-MacCormack and the last ocean liner to be fully completed in the United States as of 2015.
- Pride of America (partially built in Mississippi, then towed to Germany for outfitting)

SS Maritime.com & S S Maritime.net

==== Ships refitted ====
- USS Iowa (BB-61)
- USS Wisconsin (BB-64)

== Decatur ==
In Decatur, Alabama, Ingalls Shipbuilding built barges and type B ship barges from 1930 to 1980. In 1980 the shipyard was sold to Trinity Industries that closed in 1981. This site is now called Ingalls Harbor.
