= USS Ted Stevens =

Guided missile destroyer

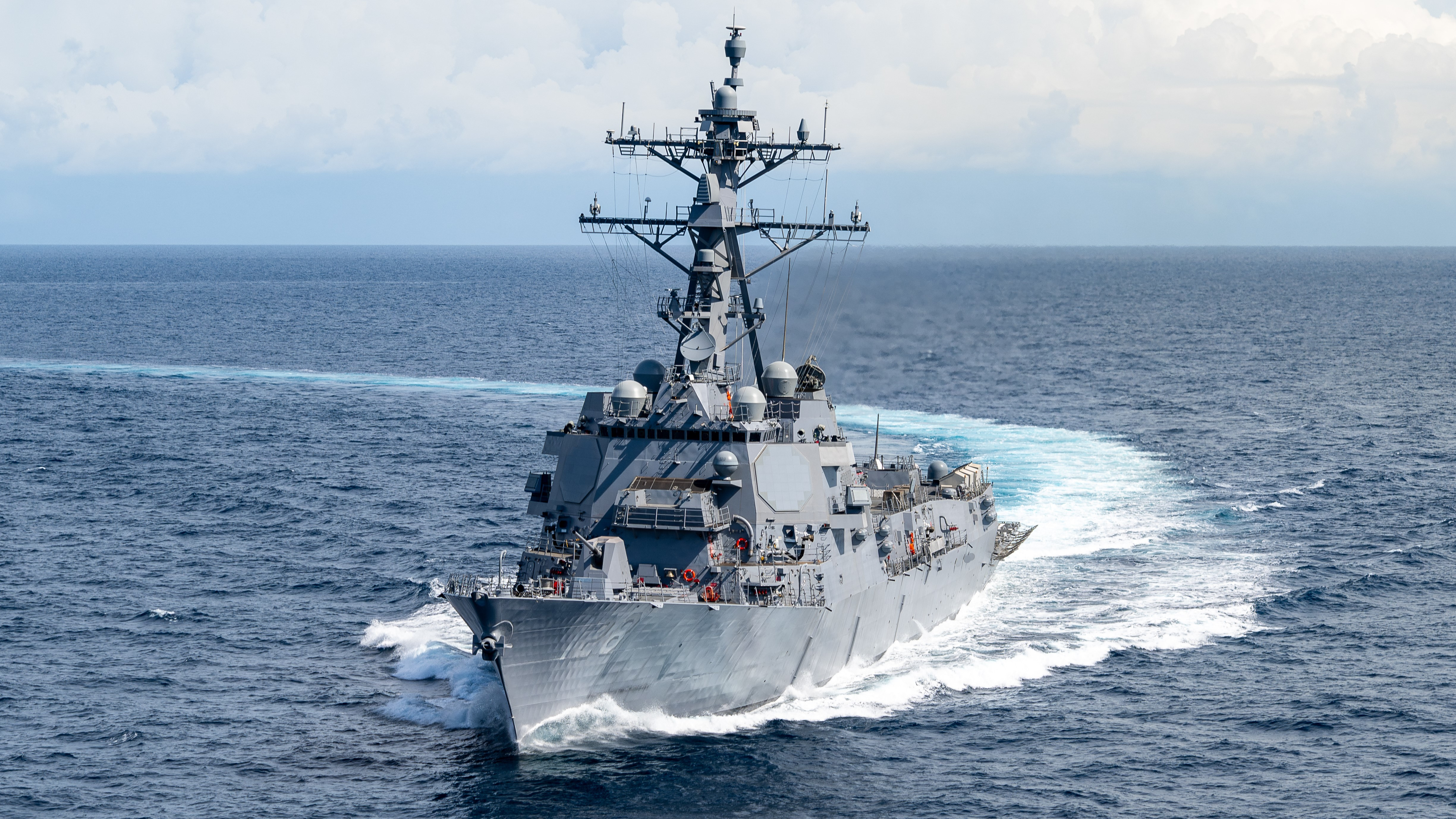

History

United States
- Name: Ted Stevens
- Namesake: Ted Stevens
- Awarded: 27 September 2018
- Builder: Huntington Ingalls Industries
- Laid down: 9 March 2022
- Launched: 15 August 2023
- Sponsored by: Catherine Ann Stevens; Susan Stevens Covich; Lily Irene Becker
- Christened: 19 August 2023
- Commissioned: 3 October 2026
- Home port: Naval Station Norfolk
- Identification: Hull number: DDG-128
- Motto: Lead with Courage
- Status: In active service
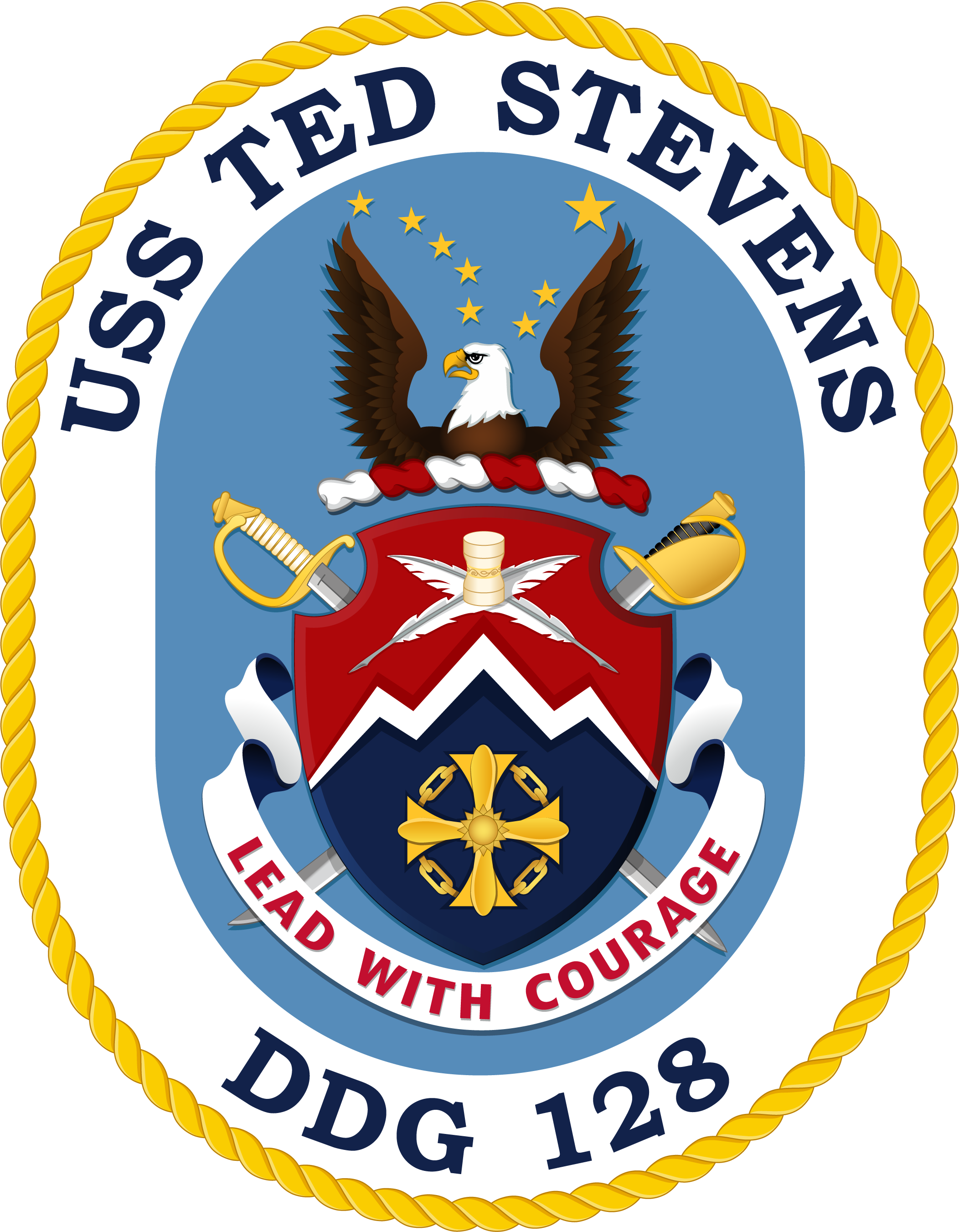
- Badge

General characteristics
- Class & type: Arleigh Burke-class destroyer
- Displacement: 9,217 tons (full load)
- Length: 510 ft (160 m)
- Beam: 66 ft (20 m)
- Propulsion: 4 × General Electric LM2500 gas turbines 100,000 shp (75,000 kW)
- Speed: 31 knots (57 km/h; 36 mph)
- Complement: 380 officers and enlisted
- Armament: Guns: 1 × 5-inch (127 mm)/62 Mk 45 Mod 4 (lightweight gun); 1 × 20 mm (0.8 in) Phalanx CIWS; 2 × 25 mm (0.98 in) Mk 38 machine gun system; 4 × 0.50 in (12.7 mm) caliber guns; Missiles: 1 × 32-cell, 1 × 64-cell (96 total cells) Mk 41 vertical launching system (VLS): RIM-66M surface-to-air missile; RIM-156 surface-to-air missile; RIM-174A Standard ERAM; RIM-161 anti-ballistic missile; RIM-162 ESSM (quad-packed); BGM-109 Tomahawk cruise missile; RUM-139 vertical launch ASROC; Torpedoes: 2 × Mark 32 triple torpedo tubes: Mark 46 lightweight torpedo; Mark 50 lightweight torpedo; Mark 54 lightweight torpedo
- Armor: Kevlar-type armor with steel hull. Numerous passive survivability measures.
- Aircraft carried: 2 × MH-60R Seahawk helicopters
- Aviation facilities: Double hangar and helipad

USS Ted Stevens (DDG-128) is an Arleigh Burke-class (Flight III) Aegis guided-missile destroyer of the United States Navy, the third of the Flight III variant. She is named in honor of Ted Stevens, a World War II veteran who served as a U.S. senator for Alaska for over 40 years and was a staunch supporter of both the Navy and the U.S. Marine Corps.

== Construction ==
The keel of Ted Stevens was laid in a ceremony at the Ingalls shipyards on 9 March 2022. She was launched on 15 August 2023 and christened four days later. She was commissioned on 3 October 2026, in Whittier, Alaska, with acting Navy secretary Hung Cao and Alaska senator Lisa Murkowski in attendance. Captain Mary Katey Hayes is her commanding officer. Ted Stevens will be homeported in Norfolk, Virginia.
