= Foster Wheeler =

Swiss global engineering company

Foster Wheeler AG
- Type: Subsidiary
- Traded as: Nasdaq: FWLT
- Industry: Engineering
- Founded: 1927; 99 years ago
- Defunct: 2014
- Headquarters: Baar, Switzerland
- Key people: J. Kent Masters (chairman and CEO)
- Revenue: US$ 3.306 billion (2013)
- Number of employees: 13,311 (December 2013)
- Parent: Amec Foster Wheeler
- Website: www.fwc.com

Foster Wheeler AG (formerly Foster Wheeler Inc.) was a Swiss global engineering conglomerate with its principal executive offices in Reading, UK and its registered office in Baar, Canton of Zug, Switzerland. Foster Wheeler was added to the NASDAQ-100 on 12 July 2007. On 13 November 2014 Foster Wheeler merged with Amec plc to form Amec Foster Wheeler. The resultant company was acquired by and merged into Wood Group in October 2017.

== History ==
Foster Wheeler was formed in 1927 from a merger of the Power Specialty Company (which replaced American Water Works Supply Company, created by Pell and Ernest Foster in 1884) and the Wheeler Condenser & Engineering Company, which was created by Frederick Merriam Wheeler in 1891.

The company was originally based in New York City but later moved to Livingston, New Jersey and stayed there for nearly a quarter century before relocating to Clinton, New Jersey in 1987. In 2000, Foster Wheeler moved its incorporation to Bermuda and in 2008, it moved its incorporation to Switzerland.

The company was listed on the New York Stock Exchange in 1929.

On 26 February 2008 Foster Wheeler announced its acquisition of Biokinetics.

Foster Wheeler was acquired by AMEC plc in the second half of 2014 to form Amec Foster Wheeler. The acquisition coincided with a downturn in the price of crude oil which depressed the market for services to the energy industry and left the merged company with substantial debt. Amec Foster Wheeler was bought by and merged into Wood Group in October 2017. Wood Group was later sold to Sidara, a Dubai-based engineering and design firm, in 2025.

== Operations ==
The company was focused on engineering, procurement, and construction management (EPC) contracting and power equipment supply. It comprised two business groups: a Global Engineering and Construction (E&C) Group and a Global Power Group.

=== Global E&C Group ===
The Global E&C Group designed, engineered and constructed leading-edge processing facilities and related infrastructure for the upstream oil and gas, LNG and gas-to-liquids, refining, chemicals & petrochemicals, pharmaceuticals, biotechnology & healthcare, environmental and power industries.

They owned technology in delayed coking, solvent de-asphalting, and hydrogen production processes. They also provided international environmental remediation services with related technical, engineering, design and regulatory services.

=== Global Power Group ===
The Global Power Group built, owned and operated cogeneration, independent power production, and waste-to-energy facilities as well as facilities for the process industries, providing electricity, steam, and feed stocks to industries and local grids.

== See also ==
- List of oilfield service companies
