= Bayfield-class attack transport =

1943 class of American attack transports

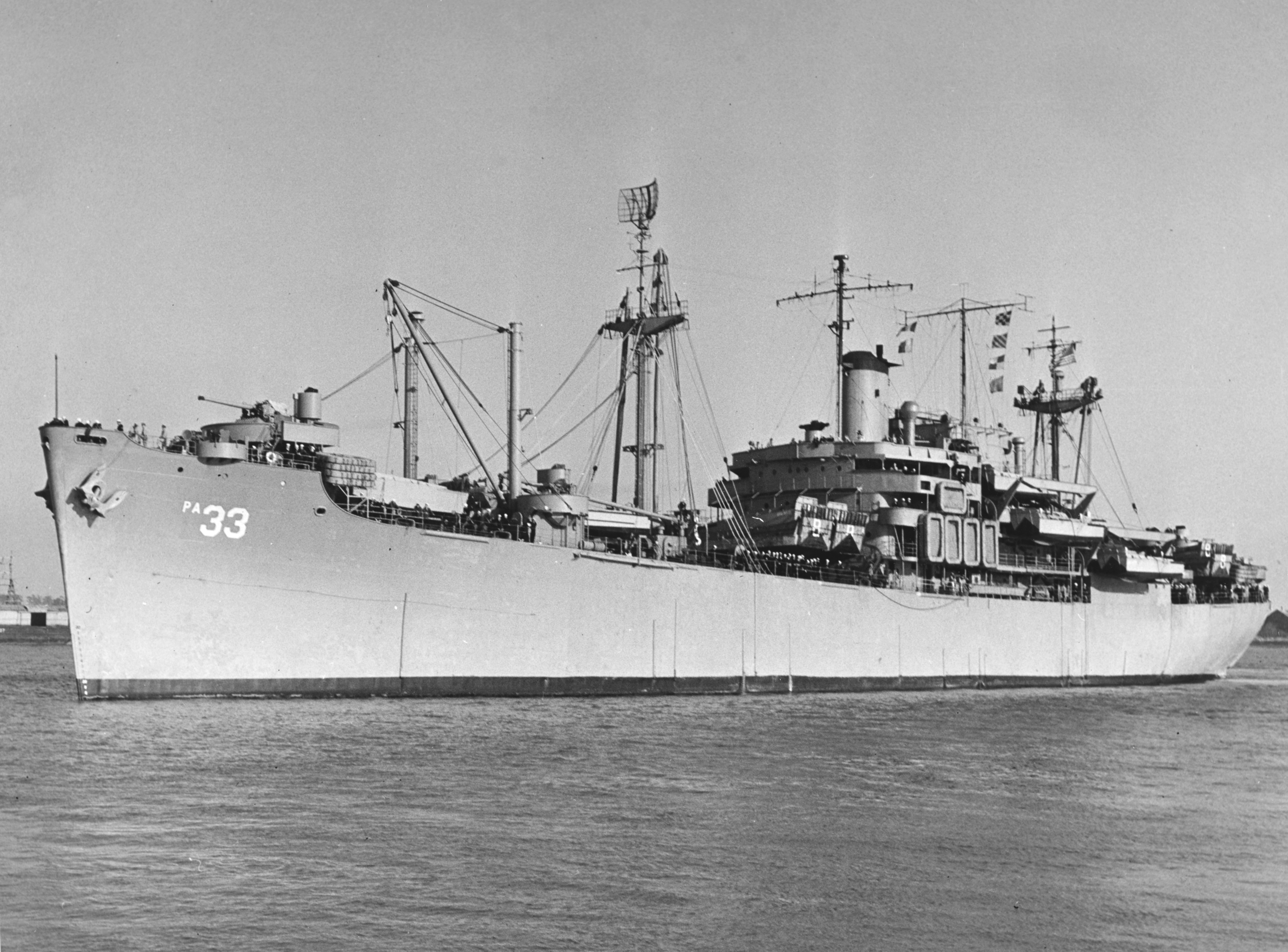
- USS Bayfield (APA-33) on 4 January 1950

Class overview
- Name: Bayfield
- Builders: Western Pipe & Steel, CA (14); Ingalls Shipbuilding, MS (20)
- Operators: United States Navy
- Preceded by: Ormsby class
- Succeeded by: Sumter class
- In commission: 1943–1945 – 1946–1970
- Completed: 34
- Active: None

General characteristics
- Type: Attack transport
- Displacement: 8,100 tons, 16,100 fully loaded
- Length: 492 ft 6 in (150.11 m)
- Beam: 69 ft 6 in (21.18 m)
- Draft: 26 ft 6 in (8.08 m)
- Propulsion: Geared turbine drive, 2 × D-type boilers, single propeller, designed shaft horsepower 8,500
- Speed: 18 knots (33 km/h; 21 mph)
- Boats & landing craft carried: 12 × LCVP; 4 × LCM; 3 × LCP(L)
- Capacity: 4,500–4,800 tons; (175,000–200,000 cubic feet).
- Complement: Crew: 51 officers 524 enlisted; Flag: 43 officers, 108 enlisted; Troops: 80 officers, 1,146 enlisted
- Armament: 2 × single 5-inch 38 caliber dual purpose guns, one fore and one aft; 2–4 × twin 40mm cannon or 2 × quad 1.1-inch/75-caliber gun mounts; 2 × single 40 mm cannon; 18 × single 20mm cannon

The Bayfield-class attack transport was a class of US Navy attack transports that were built during World War II.

With the entry of the United States into the war, it was quickly realized that amphibious combat operations on hostile shores would be required, and that specialized ships would be needed for the purpose. The so-called "attack transport" ship type (hull classification symbol APA) was developed to meet this need. Attack transports were converted from standard transport vessels by being upgraded with extra firepower, and outfitted with a number of smaller integral landing craft (such as LCVPs and LCMs) with which amphibious assaults could be conducted.

The first attack transports began to enter service in 1942 and were built ad hoc from a host of different types. The first class to be built in substantial numbers was the Bayfield class, which began to enter service in 1943. The early vessels were converted from existing cargo or transport ships, later ones built as attack transports from the keel up.

== Overview ==
Bayfield-class vessels were based on the large Type C3 passenger and cargo ship standard set by the US Maritime Commission. Originating in 1938, the C3 standard was designed to produce modern, good quality cargo and passenger ships to replace the ageing US merchant fleet, and which could also be readily converted into naval auxiliary vessels in the event of war. After the war broke out however, the need for shipping became so great that the US was forced to come up with designs that could be more quickly manufactured. Thus the C3-based Bayfield class and its predecessors were eventually outnumbered by the Haskell class which was based on the simpler Victory ship design.

== Description ==
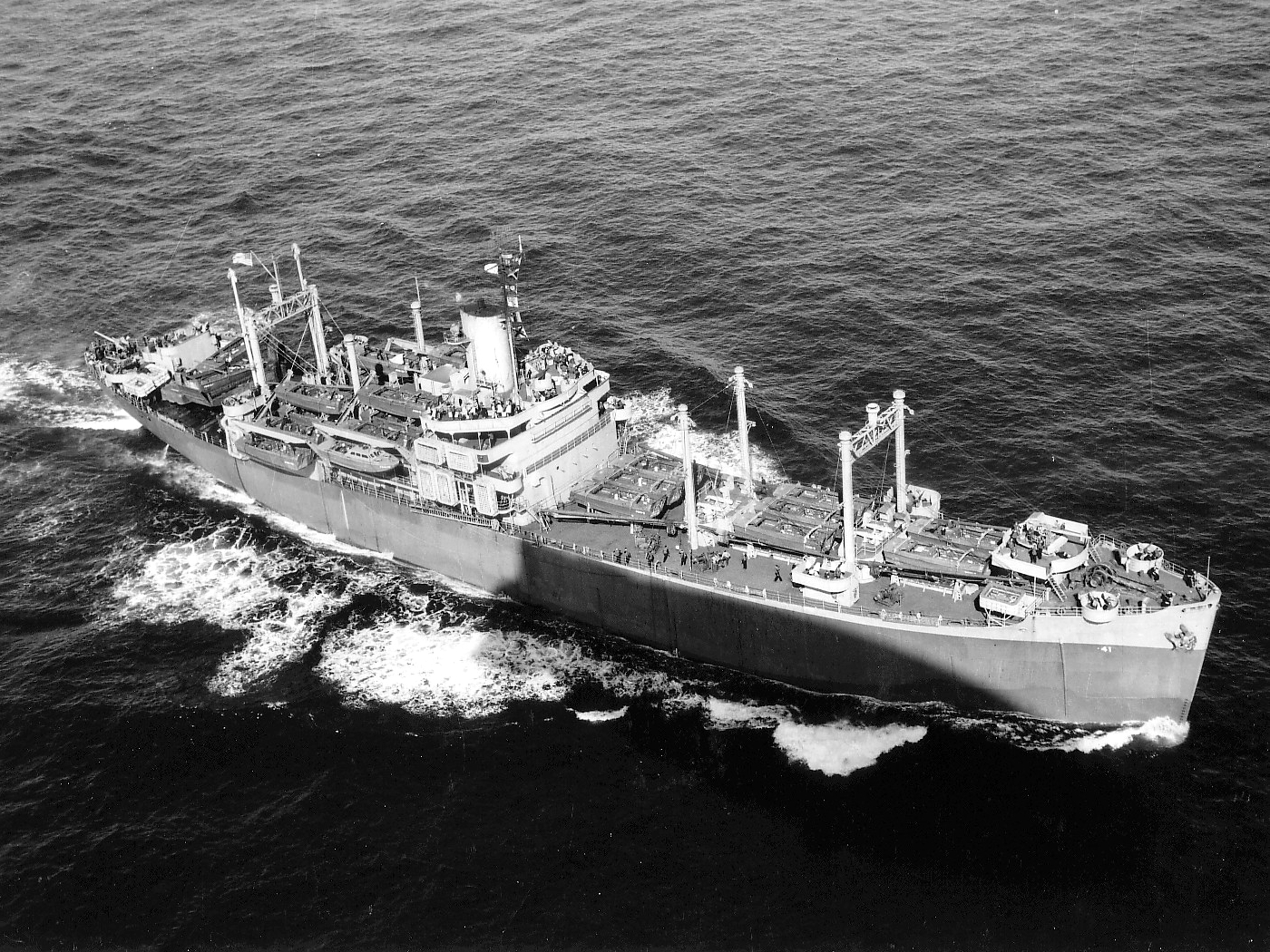
A loaded Bayfield-class attack transport underway, USS DuPage

Bayfield-class vessels were based upon the C3-S-A2 design standard. The basic design had to undergo a number of changes in order to meet the attack transport specification.

=== Troop accommodation ===
In order to accommodate the troops, two cargo holds amidships had to be converted into accommodation facilities. This was achieved by dividing each hold into three decks, and then building a number of passageways along each deck. Along both walls of each passageway, bunk-beds tiered five high were installed, and each bunk was only thirty inches wide.

The troops were provided with their own galley and mess hall separate from that of the ship's crew, but they had no dining hall and used their own mess gear to eat. A sick bay and dental clinic were also provided. The troop commander had his own private cabin and office, which was fitted with a loudspeaker system from which he could directly address the men under his command. In order to keep the soldiers entertained during their long, crowded voyages, music and other entertainment could be piped to the troop compartments.

=== Ballast ===
Because a troop transport carries less weight than a cargo ship, it was also found to be useful to use concrete as ballast in the bottom of the cargo holds in order to improve the comfort level for the ship's passengers, as well as increase safety and seagoing performance.

=== Weaponry ===
Since attack transports would be conducting operations off hostile shores, they had a greater requirement for armament than ordinary transports, particularly in regards to antiaircraft defence. The Bayfield-class vessels were well outfitted in this regard. Each vessel was fitted with a pair of 5"/38 caliber dual purpose guns, one fore and one aft. The ships were also fitted with between two and four twin 40 mm antiaircraft mounts (early examples came with two quad 1.1" gun mounts instead), plus two single 40 mm mounts and eighteen 20 mm mounts as standard.

As the war progressed, the 20 mm cannon were found to be less effective than the 40 mm, and the later Gilliam and Haskell classes dispensed with some of these mounts. The later classes also had only one 5-inch (127 mm) gun instead of two.

== Production ==
A total of 34 Bayfield-class vessels were produced between 1942 and 1944 – 20 by Ingalls Shipbuilding of Pascagoula, Mississippi and the remaining 14 at the San Francisco shipyard of Western Pipe & Steel – making the Bayfield class the second most numerous attack transport class behind the Haskell class.

== Service ==
Bayfield-class vessels served in both the Atlantic and Pacific theatres of war. Some went on to see service in the Korean and Vietnam wars.

Of the 388 attack transports (APA and AKA) of all types built, the last to see service with the US Navy was USS Chilton, a Bayfield-class vessel built by Western Pipe & Steel which was launched on 29 December 1942, first commissioned on 7 December 1943 and decommissioned in August 1970. She was finally struck from the Navy register on 1 July 1972.
