= 1944 in art =

Events from the year 1944 in art.

== Events ==
- June 6 – Normandy landings: Robert Capa takes "The Magnificent Eleven" photographs.
- July – Dulwich Picture Gallery in London is substantially damaged by a V-1 flying bomb; half a dozen paintings are destroyed, but most have been evacuated to Aberystwyth.
- 28 July - Frankfurt art theft: Three famous paintings were stolen from the Kunsthalle Schirn in Frankfurt.
- Autumn – Peggy Guggenheim's The Art of This Century gallery on Manhattan releases a 78 rpm 3-record album containing Paul Bowles' Sonata for Flute and Piano and Two Mexican Dances with a cover by Max Ernst.
- Clandestine publication of Vaincre, an album of 12 colour lithographs by 8 artists in support of the French Resistance.

== Awards ==
- Archibald Prize: Joshua Smith – Hon Sol Rosevear, MHR, Speaker of the House of Representatives

== Exhibitions ==
- Jean Dubuffet's first solo exhibition.

== Works ==
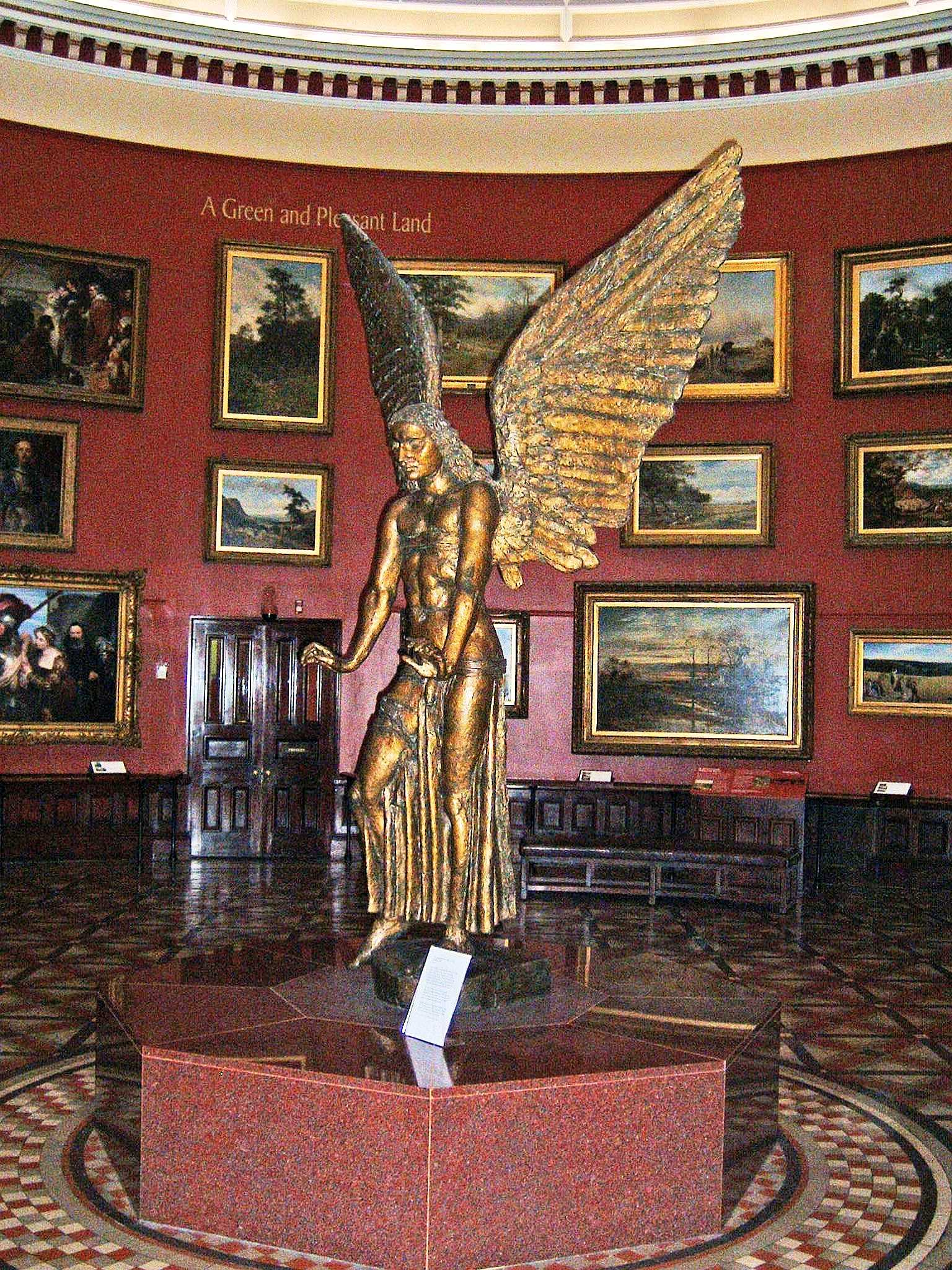
Epstein – Lucifer

- David Aronson – The Last Supper
- Duffy Ayers – Portrait of Tirzah Garwood
- Francis Bacon – Three Studies for Figures at the Base of a Crucifixion
- David Bomberg – Evening in the City of London
- Stella Bowen – Bomber Crew
- Robert Capa – "The Magnificent Eleven" (photographs)
- William Coldstream – Casualty Reception Station, Capua
- Salvador Dalí –
  - Dream Caused by the Flight of a Bee Around a Pomegranate a Second Before Awakening
  - Tristan and Isolde created for the ballet Mad Tristan by Leonide Massine and Dali which in turn was inspired by the opera Tristan und Isolde by Richard Wagner
- Paul Delvaux – Sleeping Venus
- Jacob Epstein – sculptures
  - First Portrait of Esther (with long hair)
  - Lucifer
- George Grosz – Cain, or Hitler in Hell
- Ivor Hele – Battlefield Burial of Three NCOs
- Jean Hélion – The Stairway
- Bror Hjorth – Gås-Anders (sculpture)
- Frida Kahlo
  - The Broken Column
  - Diego and Frida 1929-1944
- Dame Laura Knight – Take Off
- Fernand Léger – Three Musicians (Museum of Modern Art, New York)
- Henri Matisse – Annelies, White Tulips and Anemones
- Joan Miró – Barcelona Series (lithographs)
- Piet Mondrian (died February 1) – Victory Boogie-Woogie (unfinished)
- Walter Thomas Monnington
  - Southern England: Spitfires Attacking Flying-bombs
  - Tempests Attacking Flying-bombs
- Felix Nussbaum – Triumph of Death
- Pablo Picasso – Man with Sheep (sculpture)
- William Roberts
  - The Ballet
  - The Ferry (at Marston near Oxford)
  - Parson's Pleasure (On the Lawn)
- Robert F. Sargent – Into the Jaws of Death (photograph)
- Ben Shahn – The Red Stairway

== Births ==
- 9 January – Ian Hornak, American painter and draughtsman (d. 2002).
- 10 January – Jeff Jones, American illustrator.
- 12 February - Jane Livingston, American curator.
- 4 March – Glen Baxter, English cartoonist.
- 13 March – George Rodrigue, American painter (d. 2013).
- 29 March – Abbas, Iranian-born documentary photographer (d. 2018).
- 4 April – Phyllida Barlow, English sculptor (d. 2023).
- 8 May – David Vaughan, English psychedelic artist and muralist (d. 2003).
- 24 July – Maya Wildevuur, Dutch painter (d. 2023).
- 4 August – Allan McCollum, American conceptual artist, all media.
- 15 August – Gianfranco Ferré, Italian fashion designer (d. 2007).
- 20 August – Brian Barnes, English mural artist.
- 27 August – Catherine Leroy, French-born photographer (d. 2006).
- 1 September – Louis Delsarte, American painter (d. 2020).
- 4 November
  - Don Eddy, American painter.
  - Michael Heizer, American sculptor, earth artist.
- 23 November – Peter Lindbergh, born Peter Brodbeck, Polish-born fashion photographer (d. 2019).

=== Full date unknown ===
- Richard Mock, American painter, sculptor and cartoonist (d. 2006).
- Allen Ruppersberg, American conceptual artist, installation artist.

== Deaths ==
- January 23 – Edvard Munch, Norwegian expressionist painter (b. 1863)
- February 1 – Piet Mondrian, Dutch abstract painter (b. 1872)
- c. February 11 – Samuel Jessurun de Mesquita, Dutch Jewish graphic artist (killed in Auschwitz concentration camp) (b. 1868)
- February 26 – Lucienne Heuvelmans, French sculptor (b. 1885?)
- April 25 – George Herriman, American cartoonist (Krazy Kat) (b. 1880)
- July 18 – Rex Whistler, English painter (killed in action) (b. 1905)
- August 2 – Felix Nussbaum, German Jewish surrealist painter (killed in Auschwitz concentration camp) (b. 1904)
- August 18 – Hans Mertens, German painter (b. 1906)
- September 3 – William Logsdail, English landscape, portrait and genre painter (b. 1859)
- September 27
  - Aristide Maillol, French sculptor (b. 1861)
  - Sergey Prokudin-Gorsky, Russian-born color photographer (b. 1863)
  - David Dougal Williams, British painter (b. 1888)
- October 14 – Marko Murat, Serbian painter (b. 1864)
- October 21 – Hilma af Klint, Swedish abstract painter and mystic (b. 1862)
- November 22 – Sir George Clausen, English artist (b. 1852)
- December 10 – Miklós Ligeti, Hungarian sculptor (b. 1871)
- December 13 – Wassily Kandinsky, Russian abstract painter (b. 1866)
- December 24 – Alfred Drury, English sculptor (b. 1856)
- Undated – Esther Kenworthy Waterhouse, English flower painter (b. 1857)

== See also ==
- 1944 in fine arts of the Soviet Union
