= USS Arthur Middleton =

Warship of the United States Navy

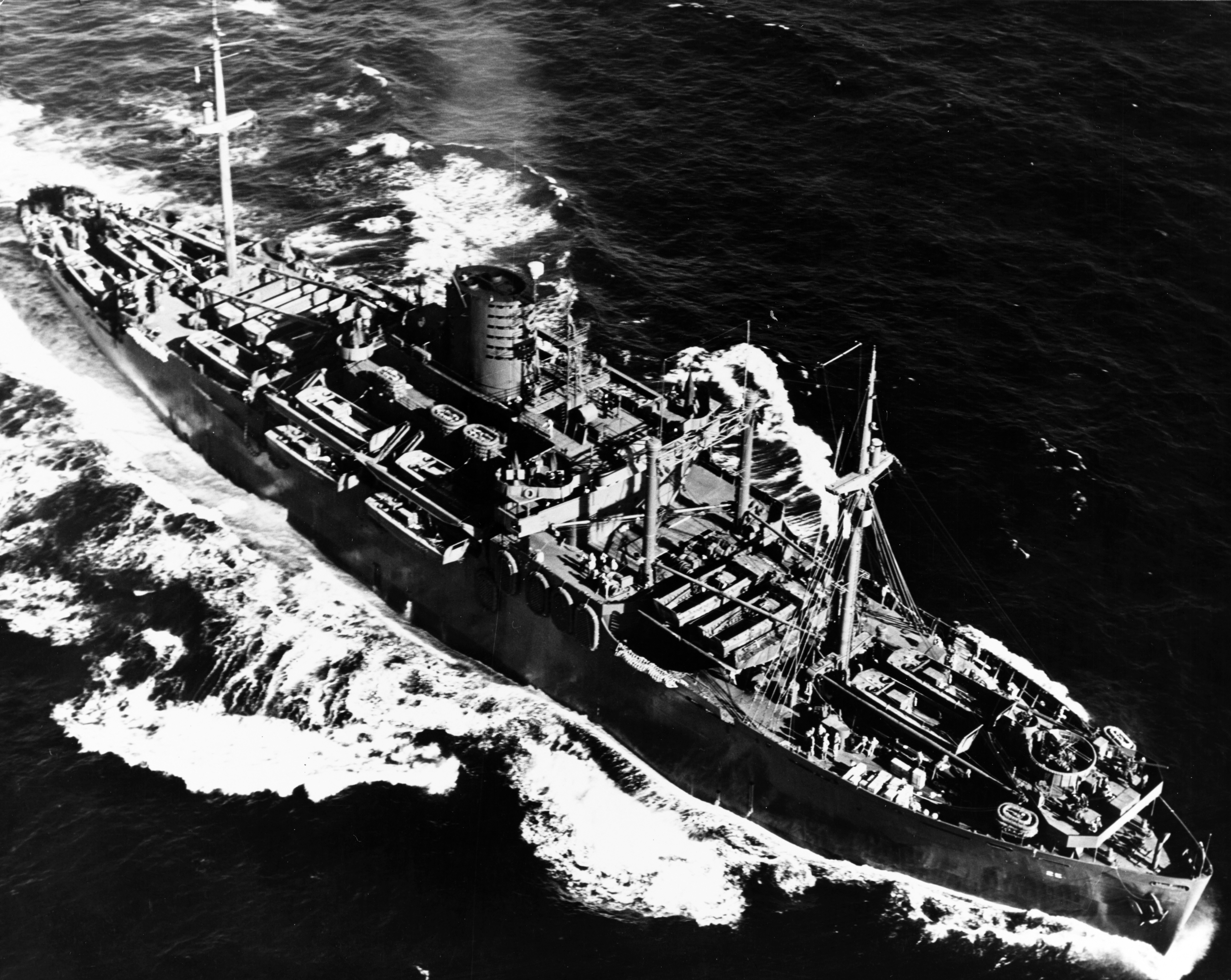
- Arthur Middleton in September 1943

History

United States NavyUnited States
- Namesake: Arthur Middleton
- Operator: United States Navy
- Laid down: 1 July 1940
- Launched: 28 June 1941
- Commissioned: 7 September 1942
- Decommissioned: 21 October 1946
- Stricken: 1 October 1958
- Fate: Sold for scrapping on 9 May 1973

General characteristics
- Tonnage: 9,000 GRT
- Displacement: 18000 tons
- Length: 489 ft (149 m)
- Beam: 69 ft 9 in (21.3 m)
- Draft: 27 ft 4 in (8.3 m)
- Speed: 18.4 knots (34 km/h)
- Complement: 530 officers and enlisted
- Armament: 4 × 3 in (76 mm); 4 × 40 mm; 10 × 20 mm

USS Arthur Middleton (AP-55/APA-25) was the lead ship of the Arthur Middleton-class attack transports and was in service with the United States Navy from 1942 to 1946. She was named for Founding Father Arthur Middleton and was scrapped in 1973.

== History ==
Arthur Middleton (Note: Not to be confused with the Liberty (EC2-S-C1) ship of the same name, 7,176 GRT, launched 3 May 1942 at Alabama Dry Dock & Shipbuilding Co. sunk 1 January 1943 off Oran, North Africa.) was a transport launched as the commercial cargo/passenger ship African Comet serving in the United States Navy during World War II. The ship, along with later sister ships SS African Meteor and SS African Planet, was at the time the largest all welded passenger/cargo ship. The ships, of 9,000 GRT and varying only in interior decorations, were designed for New York to South and East African service with accommodations for 116 passengers.

African Comet, ordered as American Banker, was laid down under a United States Maritime Commission contract (MC hull 106) on 1 July 1940 at Pascagoula, Mississippi, by the Ingalls Shipbuilding Corporation. Launched on 28 June 1941, sponsored by Miss Mary Maud Farrell, and delivered 31 December 1941. The ship was acquired by the War Shipping Administration from the American South African Line, Inc., on 31 December 1941 and purchased by the Navy on 6 January 1942.

The ship was renamed Arthur Middleton (AP-55) on 7 January 1942 for Arthur Middleton, a member of the Continental Congress and one of the 56 signers of the United States Declaration of Independence. The ship underwent initial conversion at Tietjen & Lang Dry Dock Co. yard in Hoboken, N. J. for operation as a civilian-crewed convoy-loaded transport. (Note: Photo data, US Navy Bureau of Ships photo 19-N-27271; USS Arthur Middleton (AP-55) departing New York, 18 January 1942, en route to the Pacific. dated 18 January 1942.) She was fully converted for service as a combat-loaded (attack) transport by the Union Iron Works, San Francisco, California after arrival in San Francisco from the South Pacific in June 1942. Commissioned on 7 September 1942.

After Navy acquisition and preliminary conversion, but before full conversion and commissioning, the Middleton was pressed into service during a shipping crisis involving securing the South Pacific lines of communication and critical air ferry route with Australia. New Caledonia (codename "Poppy"), a key point in those lines, had been in some turmoil with Vichy governance and recent takeover by Free French and was threatened by the Japanese. Another key island, Bora Bora (codename "Bobcat"), was also to be heavily reinforced in early 1942 yet available shipping was extremely short. Major realignment, taken to the head of state level, was required. The Bobcat convoy was to depart Charleston, South Carolina and, as a result of the candidate ship President Fillmore being damaged in a grounding with repairs taking longer than the convoy schedule allowed, the Arthur Middleton was quickly substituted and sent to Charleston from New York, but without proper ballasting for newly installed armament.

Middleton turned out to be problematic with inadequate ballast for newly installed armament. She sailed for Charleston with a twelve degree list and then required work there. Work on Middleton and President Tyler, herself described as "a mess," further delayed the convoy's departure from 15 January, already a delay from 8 January, to 25 January. A large convoy carrying elements of "Poppy Force" was to leave New York and, to conserve escorts, the Navy recommended combining the Poppy convoy with the Bobcat convoy and the Army agreed. Just as the Poppy convoy was due off Charleston the Navy found it could not make Middleton and another ship, the Hamul ready for sea until 27 January when Middleton was again delayed until mid afternoon. Middleton sailed for Australia and then to Bora Bora in Convoy BC.100 arriving Bora Bora on 17 February. The delay with ships and some cargo required that the convoy BT.200 bound for New Caledonia via Australia, carrying Poppy Force (designated Task Force 6814) that became the Americal Division, sailed separately a few days in advance of the Bora Bora force.

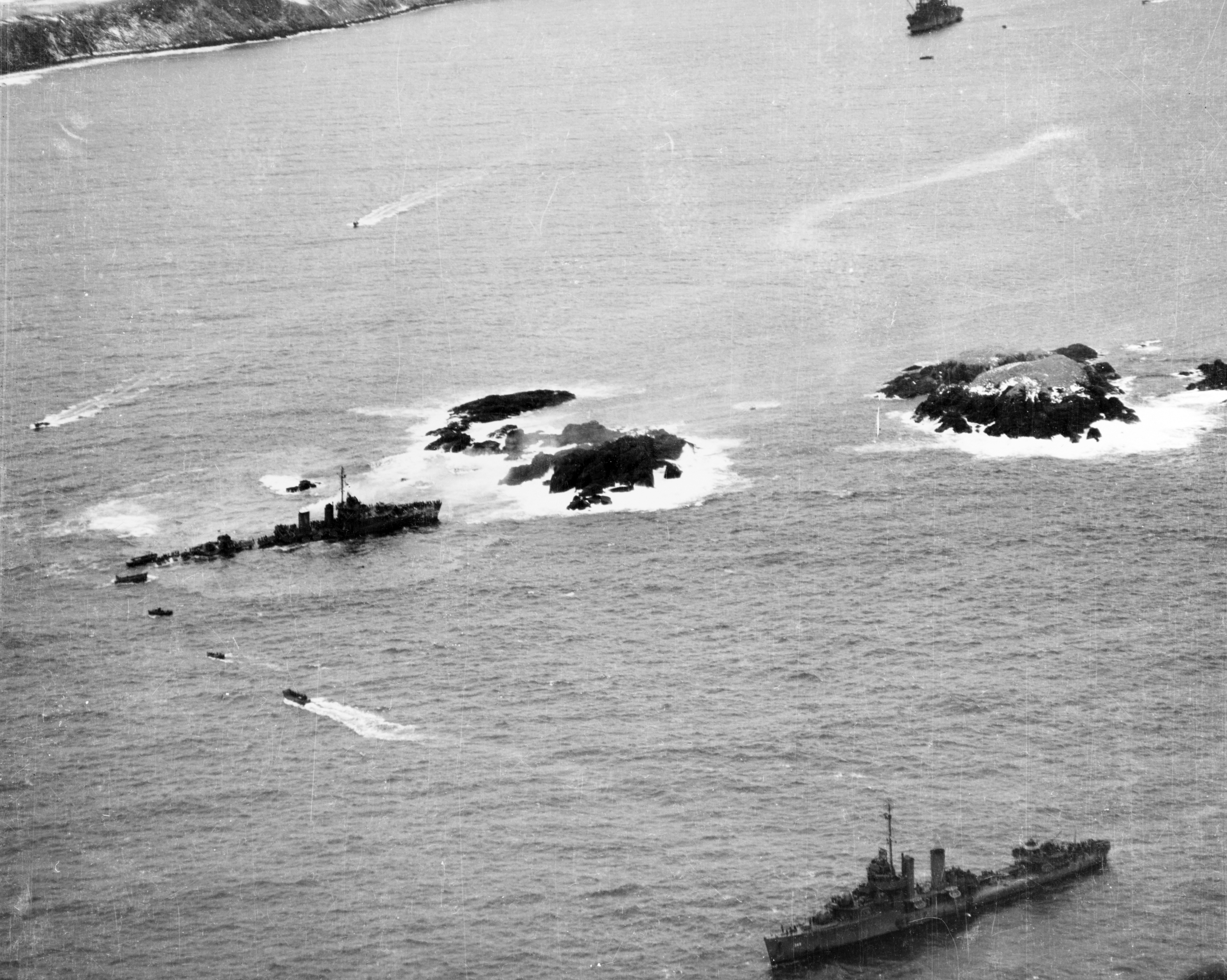
USS Arthur Middleton (AP-55) approaching (upper right) grounded USS Worden (DD-352) with USS Dewey (DD-349) standing by.

After full conversion to an attack transport in San Francisco the ship was crewed by a combined Coast Guard and Navy crew. The transport held shakedown training off San Diego, California and sailed for the Aleutian Islands on 23 December. She reached Amchitka on 12 January 1943 and, later that day, took on board 175 survivors from Worden (DD-352), which had run aground and broken up while covering the transport during the debarkation of her troops. However, before the day ended, Arthur Middleton herself ran aground after dragging anchor. Salvage operations involved completely unloading, blasting and removing the rocks from under the ship's port side, and patching the holes which they had pierced in her hull. During this work, Arthur Middleton's boats operated in Amchitak harbor unloading supply ships and moving Army barges. On eight occasions, the grounded ship repulsed enemy float-plane attacks and was straddled by four bombs.

While in Alaskan waters, Arthur Middleton was reclassified an attack transport and redesignated APA-25 on 1 February 1943. The ship was finally refloated and got underway on 9 April in tow of Ute (AT-76) and Tatnuck (AT-27) for Dutch Harbor, Unalaska. There, work making temporary repairs continued through 17 June. She was then towed by the merchant ship SS James Griffiths and Cree (AT-84) to the Puget Sound Navy Yard, Bremerton, Washington, for correction of the damage. Arthur Middleton departed Seattle, Washington, on 6 September, bound for New Zealand. She arrived at Wellington on 12 October, via Suva, Fiji Islands. The ship took on marines and cargo and sailed to Efate, New Hebrides, for staging operations. She then steamed to the Gilbert Islands for the landings on Tarawa on 20 November. The ship remained off that bitterly contested atoll debarking troops and taking casualties on board until the 29th, when she got underway for Hawaii.

On 7 December, Arthur Middleton reached Pearl Harbor and began training operations. She sortied from Oahu on 23 January 1944 with Task Group (TG) 51.1, carrying marine reserves for the assault on the Marshall Islands. The transport remained in waters east of Kwajalein Atoll from 31 January through 15 February awaiting orders to disembark her troops; but, as part of the reserve force, they were not needed. During her time steaming off Kwajalein, she provided stores and fresh water to destroyers and smaller vessels, dispatched her boats on various assignments, and repaired damaged boats. She was commanded by Lieutenant Commander Thomas Parke Hughes who later became an eminent historian. On 15 February, Arthur Middleton sailed with the task group charged with invading Eniwetok.

Arriving off that atoll on the 17th, Arthur Middleton landed assault troops on Engebi Island and unloaded her cargo as needed by forces ashore. Two days later, she took marines on board for an assault on Parry Island. The landing there took place on the 21st and 22d and, the next day, the ship sailed for Pearl Harbor with American casualties and Japanese prisoners of war embarked. She paused en route at Kwajalein on the 26th to embark more troops and then resumed her voyage to Hawaii, arriving at Pearl Harbor on 8 March.

The attack transport held training exercises off Hawaii through late May. On the 30th, she sailed with TG 52.3 for the invasion of the Marianas. The ship arrived off Saipan on 15 June and debarked her passengers later that day at Charan Kanoa. She then began taking casualties on board while unloading her cargo. Although there were frequent air raid alerts during these operations, no Japanese planes came within range of the transport guns. She departed Saipan on 23 June, stopped at Eniwetok and Tarawa to pick up Army troops and Japanese prisoners, and continued on to Pearl Harbor where she arrived on 9 July.

After disembarking her passengers, she began the first of two voyages between San Diego and Hilo, Hawaii, carrying troops and equipment between the two points. At the end of these shuttle runs, the transport sailed for the Admiralty Islands. She arrived at Manus on 3 October and began preparations for the long-awaited operations to liberate the Philippine Islands. On 14 October, Arthur Middleton sortied with TG 79.2 and arrived in Leyte Gulf on the 20th. The ship remained in the area unloading troops until 24 October, when she headed for Hollandia, New Guinea.

The attack transport returned to Leyte on 14 November, carrying personnel and supplies from Hollandia and Morotai, Netherlands East Indies. The next day, she sailed back to New Guinea and conducted training exercises in conjunction with Marine Corps units. On 31 December, the ship sailed with TG 79.4 for the invasion of Luzon and arrived in the transport area in Lingayen Gulf on 9 January 1945 and landed her troops in the face of enemy air attack. During the operation, fifteen members of her crew were wounded by flying shrapnel from the guns of other vessels firing at the Japanese planes. The transport left Lingayen Gulf later that day to take on more supplies at Leyte and returned to Lingayen Gulf on 27 January.

During February and early March, Arthur Middleton carried out training exercises at Guadalcanal. On 16 March, the transport sailed with TG 53.1 for Ulithi, where staging operations were held for the Ryūkyū campaign. The ship discharged troops and cargo at Okinawa during the first five days of April and then returned via Saipan to Pearl Harbor. She was routed on to the west coast and arrived at San Pedro, Calif., on 30 April to begin a period of overhaul.

While the ship was still in the yard, Japan surrendered on 14 August 1945. The repair work was completed on 4 September, and Arthur Middleton was assigned to duty transporting relief forces to the Philippines and returning veterans to the United States. By the end of 1945, the ship had made two voyages to the Philippines. In January 1946, she underwent repairs at Terminal Island, California. Following the detachment of her Coast Guard personnel, Arthur Middleton was transferred to the Naval Transportation Service on 1 February 1946.

During the next four months, the transport made six round trips between San Francisco and Pearl Harbor. She then steamed through the Panama Canal and continued on to Norfolk, Virginia, where she arrived on 19 July 1946. The ship was placed out of commission at Norfolk on 21 October 1946 and placed in the Atlantic Reserve Fleet. At the end of a dozen years in reserve, her name was struck from the Navy list on 1 October 1958; and the ship was transferred to the Maritime Administration for layup in the James River. She was placed in the National Defense Reserve Fleet on 3 March 1959. The vessel was sold for $96,666 on 9 May 1973 to the Consolidated Steel Corporation, Brownsville, Texas, and was later scrapped.

Arthur Middleton won six battle stars for her World War II service.

There was another ship with the name Arthur Middleton, a Liberty (EC2-S-C1) launched and delivered May–June 1942, operating at the same time as the USS Arthur Middleton until sunk by an explosion off Oran, North Africa 1 January 1943. As of 2005, no other ship in the United States Navy has been named Arthur Middleton.

== References cited ==
- Photo gallery of USS Arthur Middleton at NavSource Naval History
- Arnold Hague Convoy Database. "Convoy BC.100 (Special convoy)". Convoy Web.
- Colton, T. (18 June 2013). "Ingalls Shipbuilding". ShipBuildingHistory. Archived from the original on 16 May 2014.
- Colton, T. (8 April 2008). "Liberty Ships – Part 1: EMC #s 1 thru 417". ShipBuildingHistory. Archived from the original on 16 January 2014.
- Leighton, Richard M; Coakley, Robert W (1995). The War Department – Global Logistics And Strategy 1940–1943. United States Army in World War II. Washington, DC: Center of Military History, United States Army. pp. 179–182. LCCN 55060001.
- Maritime Administration. "African Comet". Ship History Database Vessel Status Card. U.S. Department of Transportation, Maritime Administration.
- Morton, Louis (2000). The War in the Pacific—Strategy and Command: The First Two Years. United States Army in World War II. Washington, D. C.: Center of Military History, United States Army. LCCN 61060001.
- Naval History And Heritage Command. "Arthur Middleton". Dictionary of American Naval Fighting Ships. Naval History And Heritage Command.
- Office of Naval Operations, OP-30/415 (1946). The Logistics of Advance Bases. United States Naval Administration in World War II. Washington, DC: United States Navy (transcription hosted on HyperWar). LCCN 2008584406.
- Office of Naval Operations, OP-414 (1946). History of the Naval Armed Guard Afloat—World War II. United States Naval Administration in World War II. Washington, DC: United States Navy (transcription hosted on HyperWar). LCCN 2008584406.
- Pacific Marine Review (1942). "Trial Trip S. S. African Comet". Consolidated 1942 issues (January 1942). 'Official Organ: Pacific American Steamship Association/Shipowners' Association of the Pacific Coast.
- Williford, Glen M. (2010). Racing the Sunrise—Reinforcing America's Pacific Outposts 1941–1942. Annapolis, Maryland: Naval Institute Press. ISBN 978-1-59114-956-9. LCCN 2010030455.
- USS Arthur Middleton AP-55 / APA-25, U.S. Coast Guard.
