= 1944 in the Soviet Union =

- Decades: 1920s; 1930s; 1940s; 1950s; 1960s
- See also: History of the Soviet Union; List of years in the Soviet Union

The following lists events that happened during 1944 in the Union of Soviet Socialist Republics.

== Incumbents ==
- General Secretary of the Communist Party of the Soviet Union – Joseph Stalin
- Chairman of the Presidium of the Supreme Soviet of the Soviet Union – Mikhail Kalinin
- Chairman of the Council of People's Commissars of the Soviet Union – Joseph Stalin

== Events ==
- January 14 – WWII: Soviet troops start the offensive at Leningrad and Novgorod.
- January 17 – WWII: Soviet Union ceases production of the Mosin–Nagant 1891/30 sniper rifle.
- January 29 – WWII: Koniuchy massacre: Soviet and Jewish partisans kill at least 38 villagers in Koniuchy, Poland (modern-day Kaniūkai, Lithuania).
- March 6 – WWII: Soviet Army planes attack Narva, Estonia, destroying almost the entire baroque old town.
- March 9 – WWII: Soviet Army planes attack Tallinn, Estonia, killing 757 and leaving 25,000 homeless.
- March 15 – Soviet Union introduces new anthem, replacing The Internationale.
- May 9 – WWII: In the Russian city of Sevastopol, Soviet troops completely drive out German forces.
- May 12 – WWII: Soviet troops finalize the liberation of the Crimea.
- May 18 – WWII: Deportation of the Crimean Tatars by the government of the Soviet Union.
- June 9 – WWII: Soviet leader Joseph Stalin launches the Vyborg–Petrozavodsk Offensive against Finland, with the intent of defeating Finland before pushing for Berlin.
- June 22 – WWII: Operation Bagration: A general attack by Soviet forces clears the German forces from Belarus, resulting in the destruction of German Army Group Centre, possibly the greatest defeat of the Wehrmacht during WWII.
- June 25 – WWII: The Battle of Tali-Ihantala (the largest battle ever in the Nordic countries) begins between Finnish and Soviet troops. Finland is able to resist the attack and thus manages to remain an independent nation.
- July 3 – WWII: Soviet troops liberate Minsk.
- July 8: The Mother Heroine award is established.
- July 10 – WWII: Soviet troops begin operations to liberate the Baltic countries.
- September 5 – WWII: The Soviet Union declares war on Bulgaria.
- September 6 – WWII: Tartu Offensive in Estonia concludes with Soviet forces capturing Tartu.
- September 19 – WWII: An armistice between Finland and the Soviet Union is signed, ending the Continuation War.
- September 22 – WWII: The Red Army captures Tallinn, Estonia.
- October 9 – WWII: Fourth Moscow Conference: British Prime Minister Winston Churchill and Soviet Premier Joseph Stalin begin a 9-day conference in Moscow to discuss the future of Europe.
- December 14 – Soviet government changes Turkish place names to Russian in the Crimea.
- December 18 – Joseph Stalin celebrates his 66th birthday.

== Births ==
- April 6 – Zoya Krylova, Russian journalist and politician (d. 2017)
- April 10 – Arif Mirzayev, Azerbaijani composer, organist and pianist (d. 2026)

== Deaths ==
- May 19 – Amirkhan Tleumagambetov
- December 13 – Wassily Kandinsky

== See also ==
- 1944 in fine arts of the Soviet Union
- List of Soviet films of 1944
- "1944" (song), a song performed by Jamala
