= Edward O'Donnell =

Edward O'Donnell may refer to:

- Eddie O'Donnell (1887–1920), American race car driver
- Edward O'Donnell (bootlegger) or Spike O'Donnell (1890–1962), American mobster of Irish descent
- Edward J. O'Donnell (military) (1907–1991), U.S. Navy rear admiral and commander of Guantanamo Bay Naval Base
- Edward J. O'Donnell (academic administrator) (1909–1986), President of Marquette University (1948–1962)
- Edward Joseph O'Donnell (1931–2009), Roman Catholic Bishop of the Diocese of Lafayette, Louisiana
