= Arthur Middleton-class attack transport =

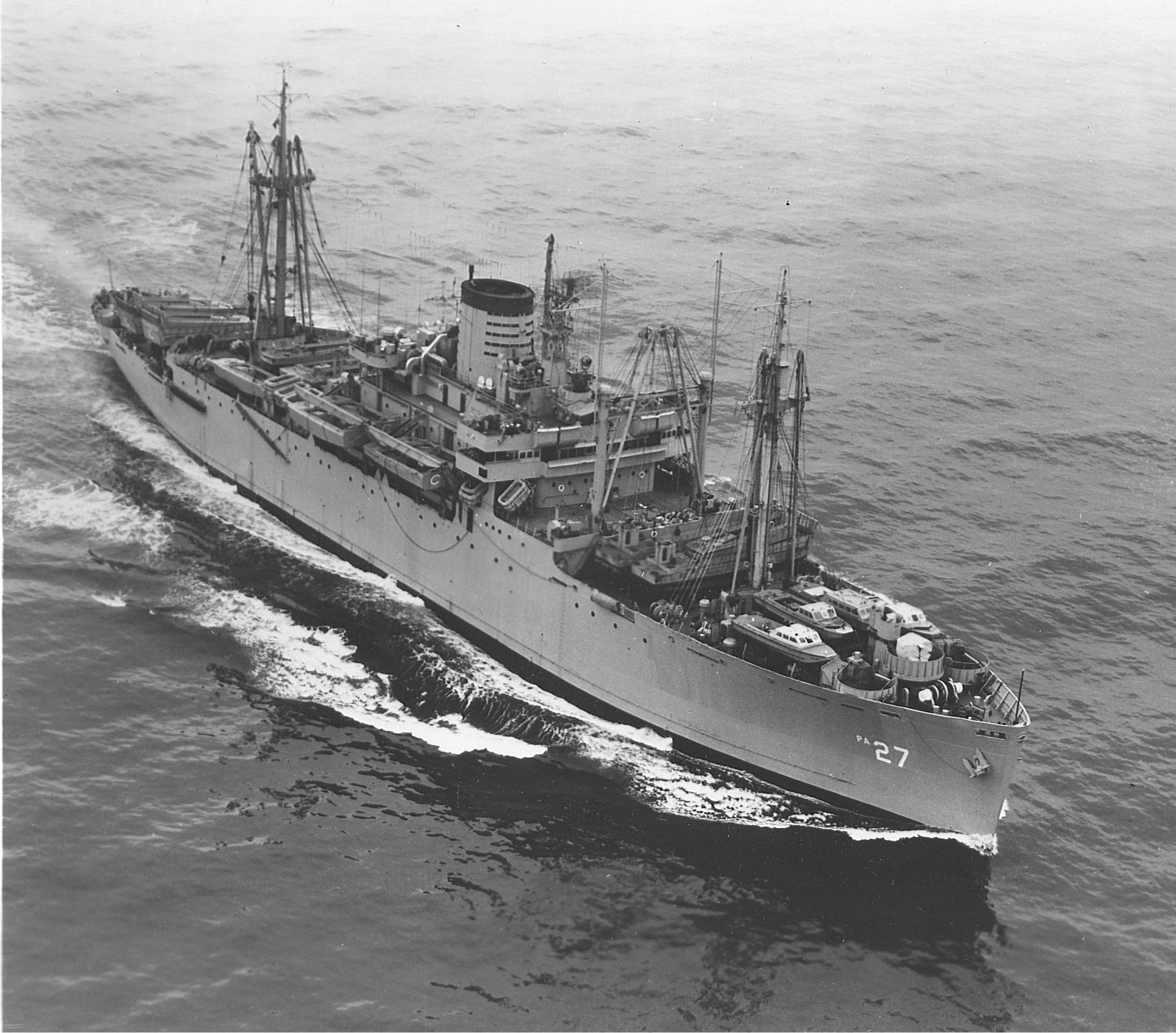
- USS George Clymer (APA-27), a ship of the Arthur Middleton class

Class overview
- Name: Arthur Middleton-class
- Builders: Ingalls Shipbuilding
- Operators: United States Navy
- Preceded by: John Penn class
- Succeeded by: Frederick Funston class
- Built: 1 Jul 1940 – 7 Sep 1942
- In commission: 13 Jun 1942 – 31 Oct 1967
- Completed: 3
- Retired: 3

General characteristics
- Type: MCV hull type C3-P&C
- Displacement: 9,000 tons (lt), 16,725 t.(fl
- Length: 489-491 ft
- Beam: ~69 ft 6 in (21.18 m)
- Draft: ~26 ft 6 in (8.08 m)
- Propulsion: General Electric geared turbine drive, 2 × Foster Wheeler D-type boilers, single propeller, 8,500 hp (6,300 kW)
- Speed: 18.4 knots (34.1 km/h)
- Capacity: Troops: 1,187-1,446; Cargo: 200,000 cu ft, 2,700 - 3,500 tons
- Complement: 29-37 officers, 448-501 enlisted
- Armament: Variable - 0-1 × 5"/38 caliber gun, 4 × 3"/50 caliber dual-purpose guns, 8 × 40mm guns, 0-10 × single 20mm guns, 0-4 × .50 cal. MG's

The Arthur Middleton-class attack transport was a class of three US Navy attack transports that saw most of their service in World War II. Ships of the class were named after signatories of the American Declaration of Independence.

Like all attack transports, the purpose of the Arthur Middleton class was to transport troops and their equipment to hostile shores to execute amphibious invasions. To perform this task, attack transports were equipped with a substantial number of integral landing craft, and heavily armed with antiaircraft weaponry to protect themselves and their vulnerable cargo of troops from air attack in the battle zone.

== Background ==
The Arthur Middleton class was based on the Maritime Commission's ubitiquous Type C3 hull - specifically the C3-P&C (Passenger and Cargo) type. This hull type had been designed with both merchant cargo service and naval auxiliary service in mind.

All three ships were laid down by the Ingalls Shipbuilding Company of Pascagoula, Mississippi, between July and October 1940. Time between initial laying of the keel to commission for each vessel varied from 20 to 26 months - an unusually long time, which suggests the shipyard may have experienced delays or had other priorities. The first to be commissioned was Samuel Chase on 13 June 1942, followed by the George Clymer two days later. Arthur Middleton, the lead ship of the class, was laid down first, but not commissioned until 7 September 1942, about three months later. The ships were initially classified as transports (AP), but were redesignated attack transports (APA) on 1 February 1943, the date on which several other classes of transport ships were redesignated.

== In service ==
During World War II, two of the ships, Arthur Middleton and George Clymer, served almost exclusively in the Pacific Theatre, taking part in many of the Navy's island-hopping campaigns. Samuel Chase, however, was assigned to the European Theatre, where she participated in the invasions of North Africa, Sicily, Italy, and Normandy, before transferring to the Pacific to take part in the final Battle of Okinawa.

Immediately after the war, the three ships of the class were assigned to transporting troops to occupation duties in newly conquered Japan. They were then assigned to Operation Magic Carpet, the huge sealift organized to return demobilizing servicemen to the United States.

Following the Magic Carpet operation, two of the ships were decommissioned in late 1946 - early 1947, after which they saw no further service. George Clymer, however, remained in commission, eventually serving in the Chinese Civil War, the Korean War, and the Vietnam War. She was finally retired on 31 October 1967, having provided the Navy with 26 years of continuous service and accumulated an impressive 15 battle stars. She was sold for scrap on 31 July 1968. Her two sister ships, decommissioned more than 20 years earlier, followed her to the scrapyard on 9 May 1973.
