= The Magnificent Eleven =

Series of photographs by Robert Capa

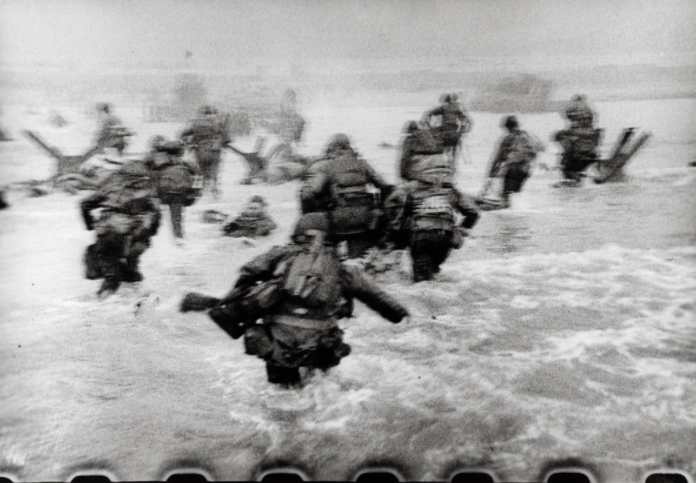
16th Infantry Regiment of the 1st Infantry Division moving towards the D-Day Beach taken by Capa

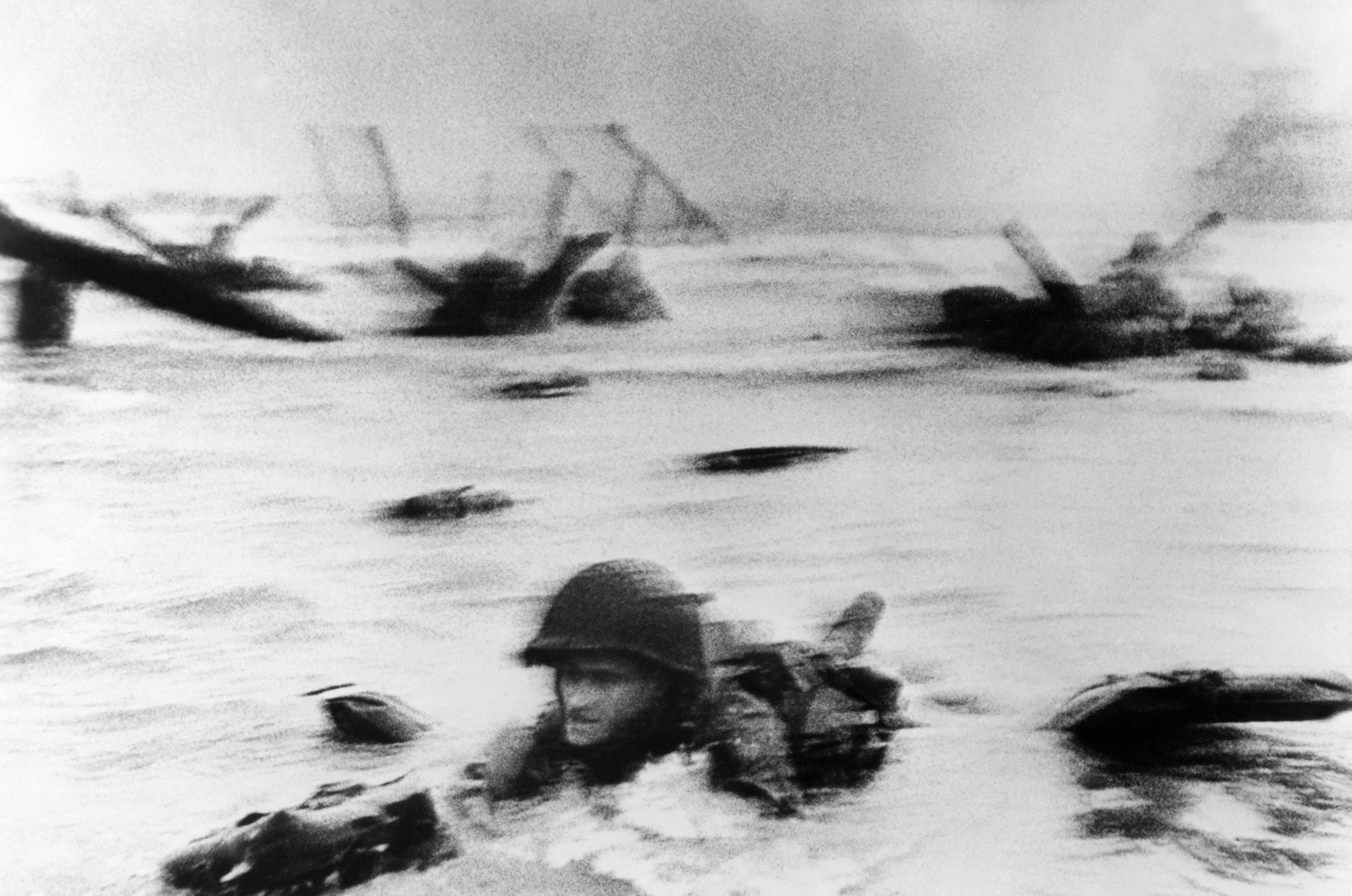
The iconic photo Face in the Surf: American GI moving toward Omaha Beach taken by Capa

The Magnificent Eleven are a group of photos of D-Day (6 June 1944) taken by war photographer Robert Capa. Capa was with one of the earliest waves of troops landing on the American invasion beach, Omaha Beach. Capa stated that while under fire, he took 106 pictures, all but eleven of which were destroyed in a processing accident in the Life magazine photo lab in London, although the accidental loss of the remaining negatives has been disputed. The surviving photos have since been called the Magnificent Eleven. The pictures have been widely celebrated, and Steven Spielberg is said to have been inspired by them when filming Saving Private Ryan.

== Taking the pictures ==
Capa came ashore with the men of the 16th Infantry Regiment of the 1st Infantry Division on 6 June 1944 (D-Day) in an early wave of the assaults on Omaha Beach (reported variously as the "first wave" or thirteenth, though just an hour behind the first wave). He used two Contax II cameras mounted with 50 mm lenses and several rolls of spare film, and returned to the United Kingdom within hours in order to meet a publication deadline for Life magazine's next issue.

== Publication ==
Life magazine printed five of the pictures in its June 19, 1944, issue, "Beachheads of Normandy: The Fateful Battle for Europe is Joined by Sea and Air." Some of the images had captions that described the footage as "slightly out of focus", explaining that Capa's hands were shaking in the excitement of the moment. Capa denied this in his biography, but also Capa stated that his "empty camera trembled in my hands", preventing him from loading a new roll of film. Capa used this phrase as the title of his autobiographical account of the war, Slightly Out of Focus.

The captions were written by magazine staffers, as Capa did not provide Life with notes or a verbal description of what they showed. The captions have since been shown to be erroneous, as were subsequent descriptions of the images by Capa himself. For example, men described by Life as soldiers taking cover behind a hedgehog obstacle were members of Gap Assault Team 10 – a combined US Navy/US Army explosives demolition unit tasked with destroying obstacles and clearing the way for subsequent landing craft.

== Missing pictures ==
According to Capa, he took 106 pictures in the first two hours of the invasion. Capa returned with the unprocessed films to London, where a staff member at Life made a mistake in the darkroom; he set the dryer too high and melted the emulsion in the negatives in three complete rolls and over half of a fourth roll. Only eleven frames in total were recovered. Accounts differed in blaming a fifteen-year-old lab assistant named Dennis Banks, or Larry Burrows, who would later be known for his photography but worked in the lab at this time.

Historian and critic A. D. Coleman has suggested that this famous and widely disseminated story is implausible, because (among other things) the temperatures used by such driers would not have been hot enough to melt or set fire to film. He claims instead that Capa might have only stayed on the beach long enough to make the ten surviving exposures and then left.

Towards the end of his life, Capa's former editor, John Morris, conceded that the story may be false, saying: "It's quite possible that Bob just bundled all his 35 [mm film rolls] together and just shipped it off back to London, knowing that on one of those rolls there would be the pictures he actually shot that morning."

== Identifying the subjects ==
For many years the soldier in the most well-known of the photographs was identified as Edward Regan. Another soldier, Huston Riley, has also been put forward. Riley himself remembered meeting a photographer who helped him out of the water: "I was surprised to see him there. I saw the press badge and I thought, 'What the hell is he doing here?' He helped me out of the water and then he took off down the beach for some more photos." The combat engineer behind the hedgehog is believed to be James E. Terrell, who remembered Capa pointing a camera at him, as the man next to Terrell was alive in the first photo and was killed by the second photo. More recent identification of the specific section of beach where the pictures were taken suggests that Regan and Riley were on different beach sections.

== Public collections ==
Prints of the photographs are kept at the International Center of Photography, in New York.

== See also ==
- List of photographs considered the most important
- Into the Jaws of Death, D-Day photograph by Robert F. Sargent
