= USS George Clymer =

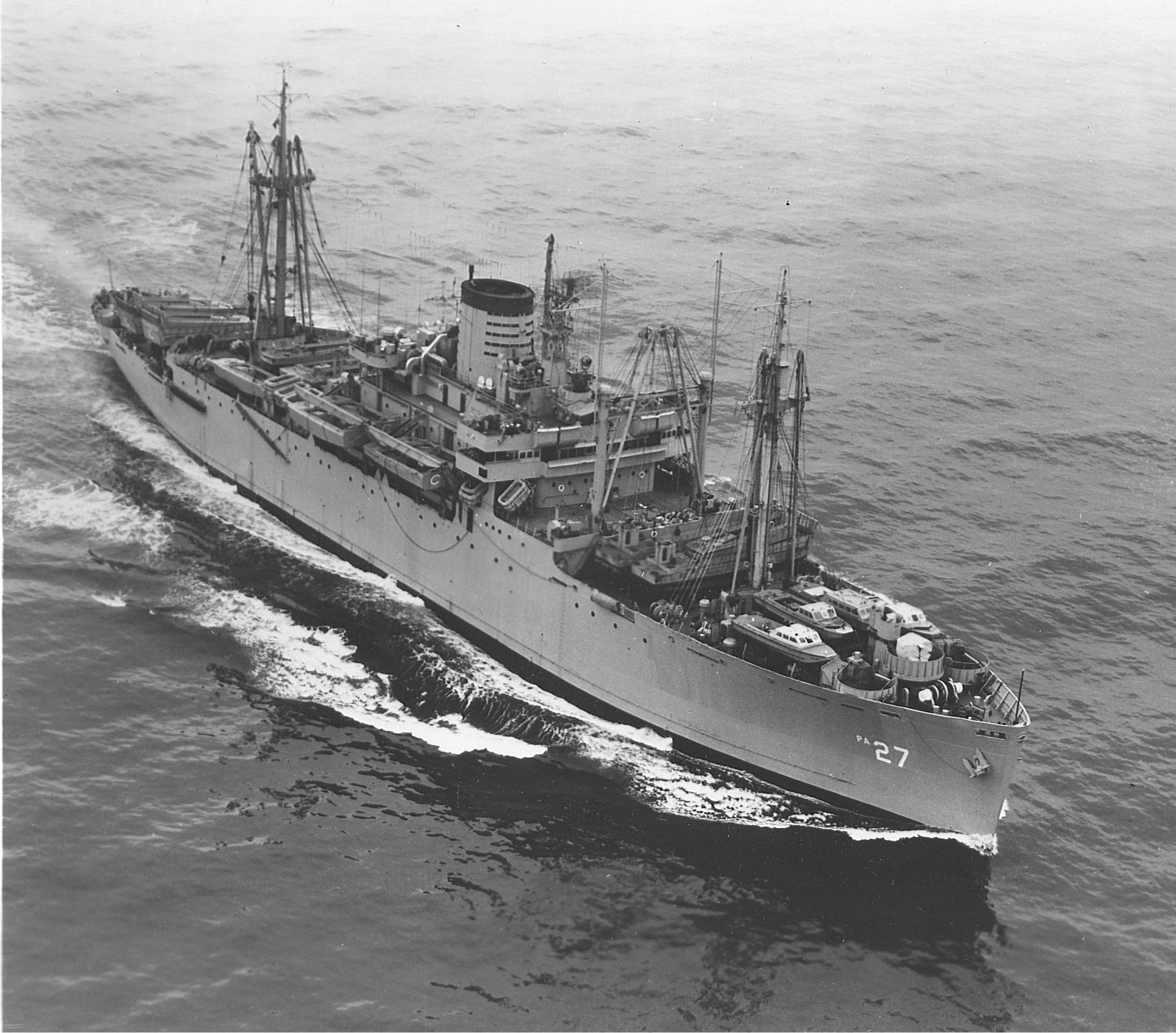
- USS George Clymer (APA-27) underway

History

United States
- Name: USS George Clymer (APA-27)
- Namesake: George Clymer, American Founding Father
- Builder: Ingalls Shipbuilding
- Laid down: 28 October 1940
- Launched: 27 September 1941
- Sponsored by: Mrs Kathryn Stapleton
- Christened: African Planet
- Acquired: 15 June 1942
- Commissioned: 15 June 1942
- Decommissioned: 31 October 1967
- Renamed: USS George Clymer
- Reclassified: AP-57 to APA-27, 1 February 1943
- Identification: MCV Hull Type C3-P&C, MCV Hull No. ?
- Nickname(s): Greasy George
- Honours and awards: Five battle stars for World War II service, seven for the Korean War, and three for the Vietnam War
- Fate: Sold for scrap, 26 July 1968

General characteristics
- Class & type: Arthur Middleton-class attack transport
- Displacement: 9.000 tons(lt) 16,725 t.(fl)
- Length: 491 ft (149.7 m)
- Beam: 69.5 ft (21.2 m)
- Draft: 26.5 ft (8.1 m)
- Propulsion: Steam turbine, single shaft, designed shaft horsepower 8,500
- Speed: 18.4 knots
- Capacity: Troops: 1,304; Cargo: 140,000 cu ft, 2,300 tons
- Complement: 578
- Armament: 1 x 5"/38 cal dual-purpose gun, 4 x 3"/50 caliber dp guns, 8 x single Bofors 40 mm gun mounts, 4 x .50 cal (12.7 mm) machine guns

USS George Clymer (APA-27) was an Arthur Middleton-class attack transport that saw service with the US Navy in four wars - World War II, the Chinese Civil War, the Korean War, and the Vietnam War. She was named after United States Founding Father George Clymer.

George Clymer (AP-57) was laid down as African Planet under a Maritime Commission contract 28 October 1940 by Ingalls Shipbuilding of Pascagoula, Mississippi; she was launched 27 September 1941, renamed George Clymer 9 January 1942, acquired by the Navy 15 June 1942, and commissioned the same day.

== World War II ==
George Clymer sailed 21 June via Charleston to Norfolk, Virginia, where she arrived 30 July for training in Chesapeake Bay. She embarked 1,400 men of the 9th Infantry Division and departed 23 October for French Morocco.

=== Invasion of French Morocco ===
After joining Rear Admiral Monroe Kelley's Northern Attack Group off the Moroccan coast 7 November, at midnight on 8 November, she debarked assault troops on special net-cutting and scouting missions against garrisons at Mehedia and the fortress Kasba. Just before dawn, the first wave of troops hit the beach and encountered resistance from the Vichy French. Enemy shore batteries fired on the assembled transports and straddled George Clymer before she opened the range. Hard fighting continued ashore until 11 November. George Clymer debarked troops, unloaded cargo, and treated casualties until 15 November, when she sailed to Casablanca to complete offloading cargo. She departed for the United States the 17th, arriving at Norfolk 30 November.

=== Transfer to the Pacific ===
After embarking more than 1,300 Seabees, George Clymer sailed on 17 December for the Pacific. One of the first transports to serve in both the Atlantic and Pacific, she reached Nouméa, New Caledonia, 18 January 1943; she sailed 23 January for the Fiji Islands, and arrived Espiritu Santo, New Hebrides, 30 January. Redesignated (APA-27) on 1 February, she sailed in convoy on 5 February for Guadalcanal, Solomons, where she arrived on 7 February to debark reinforcements and embark casualties and Japanese prisoners of war. During almost the next 9 months, she sailed the Southwest Pacific, carrying cargo and rotating troops from bases in New Zealand, New Caledonia, the New Hebrides, and the Fijis to Guadalcanal. On 19 April, she evacuated 38 Chinese and Fijian women and children, who had hidden from the Japanese for more than a year, from Guadalcanal and transported them to Nouméa.

=== Invasion of Bougainville ===
As the flagship of Rear Admiral Theodore Stark Wilkinson's 3rd Amphibious Force, George Clymer departed Guadalcanal 30 October for the invasion of Bougainville. Closing Cape Torokina 1 November, she disembarked men of the 2nd Marine Raider Battalion before joining other transports in a combined bombardment of enemy positions on Cape Torokina. She returned to Port Purvis on Florida Island in the Solomons, on 3 November; during the next two months, she made three runs to Bougainville, carrying reinforcements and cargo from the Fijis and Guadalcanal.

=== Invasion of the Marianas ===
George Clymer continued troop-carrying and supply runs in the Southwest Pacific until 4 June 1944, when she departed Guadalcanal for the invasion of the Marianas. Steaming via Kwajalein, she operated off Saipan from 17 to 30 June, while serving as flagship of Rear Admiral Lawrence Fairfax Reifsnider's Southern Attack Group. She reached Eniwetok on 4 July; departed 17 July for the assault against Guam - and arrived off Agat 21 July. After debarking assault troops, she served as receiving ship, boat pool tender, and medical station for the Southern Transport Group. She remained at Guam until 20 August; steamed via Saipan to Hawaii; and arrived Pearl Harbor 31 August.

=== Invasion of Leyte ===
Underway again on 15 September, George Clymer steamed via Eniwetok and Manus, Admiralties, to the Philippines, where she landed nearly 1,000 troops at Dulag on 21 October during the battle of Leyte. She returned to Manus on 28 October, and following a troop and cargo-carrying mission to New Britain and back, she sailed 11 November for the United States and arrived San Francisco on 3 December for overhaul.

=== Invasion of Okinawa ===
Sailing on 26 January 1945, she reached Guadalcanal on 11 February, and for more than a month, trained for the invasion of Okinawa. She departed Ulithi, Carolines, in convoy on 27 March; she arrived off Hagushi on 1 April; then debarked troops and unloaded cargo before departing on 5 April. Steaming via Saipan and Pearl Harbor, she arrived in San Francisco on 9 May.

After conversion to a transport squadron and relief amphibious force flagship, she transported 1,200 Seabees to Pearl Harbor from 21 to 27 July. After returning to San Francisco on 5 August with wounded veterans embarked, she sailed on 12 August for the Philippines.

=== After hostilities ===
She reached Manila on 7 September, embarked nearly 1,000 occupation troops of the 33rd Infantry Division, and transported them to Japan, arriving at Wakayama on 25 September. Between 3 and 21 October, she made a similar voyage from Leyte to Japan, then as part of Operation Magic Carpet fleet, between 31 October and 14 November, she carried more than 1,200 veterans from Saipan to San Francisco. Between 27 November and 28 December, she cruised to Guam and Saipan and returned to San Pedro, California, with homebound troops.

== Postwar service ==
=== Atomic bomb tests ===
Prior to the Korean War, George Clymer supported various naval operations in the Pacific. From 1 June to 20 August, she served at Bikini Atoll as flagship for Transport Division 11 during atomic bomb tests in the Marshall Islands.

=== Chinese Civil War ===
She conducted training operations along the Pacific Coast until 15 December 1947, when she departed San Pedro for the Far East. Arriving at Qingdao, China, on 20 January 1948, for more than six months, she operated along the Chinese coast supporting the Nationalist Chinese troops during the Chinese Civil War. She departed Qingdao on 5 August, embarked troops at Guam, and transported them via the Panama Canal to Morehead City, North Carolina, where she arrived 17 September. George Clymer returned to San Diego on 4 October, and during the next 19 months, she operated off the coast of Alaska, the West Coast, and in Hawaiian waters.

== Korean War ==
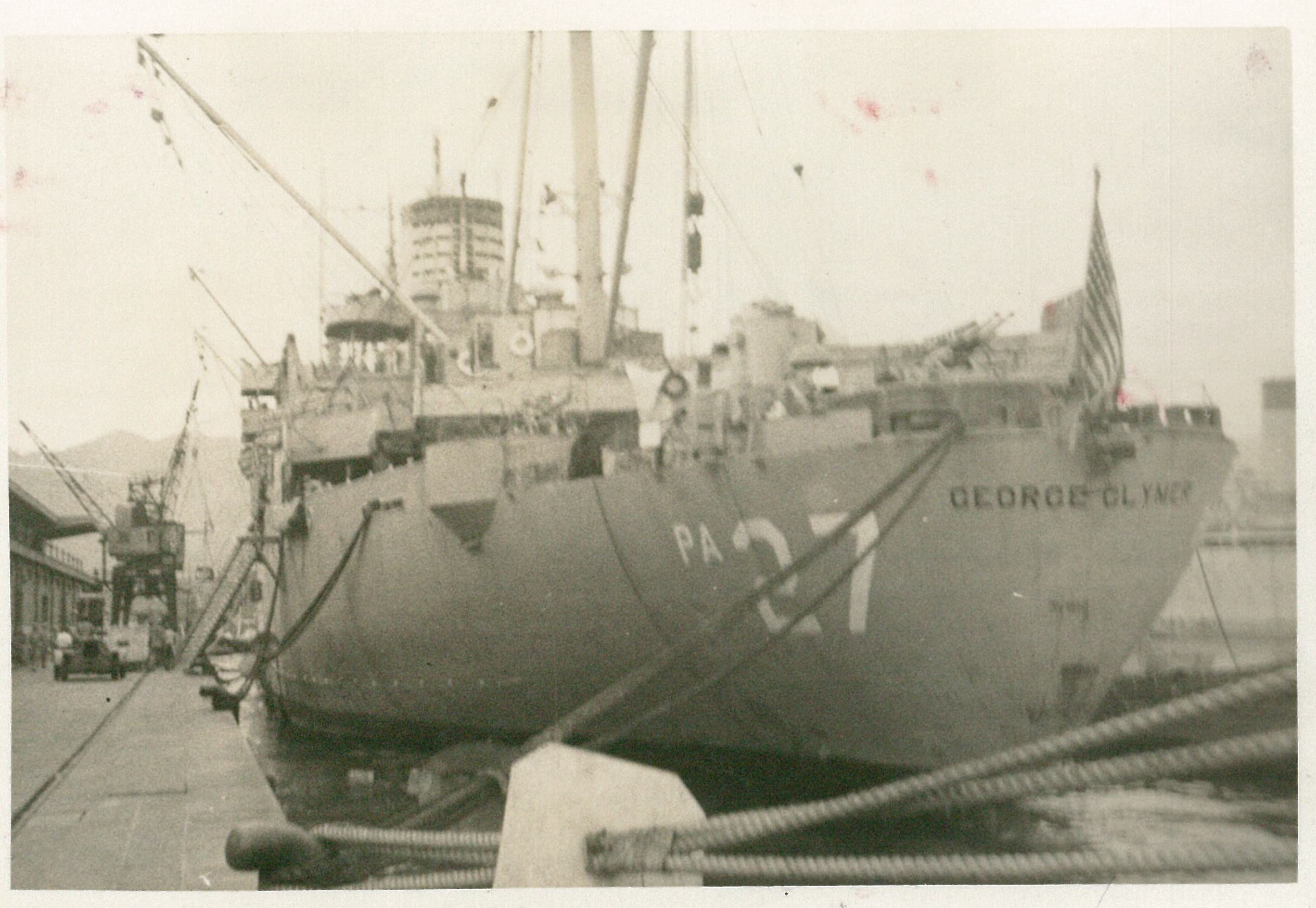
USS George Clymer embarking marines in Kobe, Japan on 8 September 1950.

After the invasion of South Korea by North Korean troops, she departed San Diego on 14 July and carried units of the 5th Provisional Marine Brigade to Pusan, South Korea, where she debarked them on 2 August to help stem the Communist advance at Masan. After returning to Yokosuka, Japan, on 7 August, she embarked men of the 1st Marine Division at Kobe for the amphibious invasion at Inchon on 15 September. Following the successful landings, she served as amphibious control and hospital ship before returning to Sasebo on 29 September with casualties. She returned to Inchon on 8 October to embark marines, and on 17 October, she sailed for Wonsan, where she landed troops on the 25th. Departing Wonsan on 30 October, she steamed via Yokosuka to the United States and arrived at San Diego 24 November.

George Clymer departed San Diego 4 June 1951 and, after embarking troops at San Francisco, she sailed 6 June for the Far East, arriving Yokosuka 20 June. During the next 10 months she supported the effort to repel Communist aggression in Korea; participated in amphibious landings along the Korean coast; rotated troops between Japan and Korea, and cruised Far Eastern waters from the Sea of Japan to the South China Sea to meet the demands of military forces in Asia. On 15 October she rescued nearly 500 survivors from a Japanese merchantman caught during a typhoon at Uku Shima, Japan. She departed Yokosuka 1 April 1952; returned to the United States for 7 months; then sailed from San Diego 12 November for a third deployment off Korea under the command of CAPT Edward J. O'Donnell. After reaching Yokosuka 29 November, she took part in troop-rotation runs between Korea and bases in Japan, Okinawa, and the Philippines. On 27 July 1953, as the armistice which brought an uncertain peace to Korea was signed at Panmunjom, she departed Yokosuka for the United States, arriving San Diego 22 August.

== 1950s ==
After the termination of hostilities in Korea, George Clymer deployed to the Far East on numerous occasions as an important unit of the 7th Fleet. Capable of carrying combat-ready troops to any beach in the Western Pacific and Southeast Asia, she provided vital support to the Fleet's operations.

== Vietnam War ==
In August 1964 she cruised the South China Sea in an advanced state of readiness following the Gulf of Tonkin incident. During the summer of 1965 she deployed to South Vietnam, where she participated in amphibious landings at Da Nang and Chu Lai. She participated in further Vietnamese operations in the spring and summer of 1966. She transported marines from Hawaii to Okinawa in June 1965 in preparation for the 7th Marines' August landing in Chu Lai. Soon after departure from Hawaii, she broke down earning the Marines' title of "Greasy George."

== Decommission ==
USS George Clymer was decommissioned on 31 October 1967 at San Diego. She was sold for scrapping to the National Metals & Steel Corporation on 26 July 1968, bringing to an end a long and distinguished 25-year career with the US Navy.

== Awards ==
George Clymer received five battle stars for World War II service, seven for the Korean War and three for the Vietnam War.
