= 1944 in fine arts of the Soviet Union =

The year 1944 was marked by many events that left an imprint on the history of Soviet and Russian Fine Arts.

== Events ==
- February 23 — Exhibition of works by artists of Battle Art Studio after Mitrofan Grekov was opened in Moscow in the Central House of Red Army. The exposition includes art works by 36 authors.
- August 1 — Exhibition of landscape painting was opened in Moscow. Exhibited 200 works of painting and graphics of 98 authors. The participants were Pavel Kuznetsov, Alexander Kuprin, Eugene Lanceray, Dmitriy Nalbandyan, Alexander Osmerkin, Fyodor Reshetnikov, Konstantin Yuon, and other important Soviet artists.

== Deaths ==
- January — Vladimir Baranov-Rossiné, also spelled Baranoff-Rossiné (Russian: Владимир Давидович Баранов-Россіне; Auschwitz), born Shulim Wolf Leib Baranov, was a painter and sculptor of Jewish origin active in Russia and France (b. 1888).
- March 20 — Ilya Mashkov (Russian: Машков Илья Иванович), Russian Soviet painter, exhibitor of the circle of "Jack of Diamonds" (Russian: Бубновый Валет), Honored Art worker of Russian Federation (b. 1881).
- December 13 — Wassily Kandinsky (Russian: Кандинский Василий Васильевич), Russian abstract painter and art theorist (b. 1866).
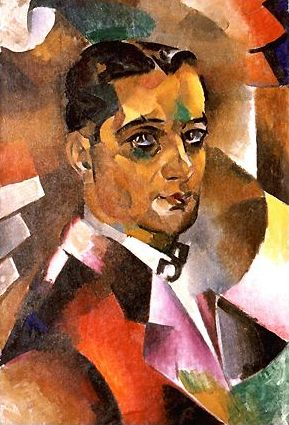
Wladimir Baranoff-Rossine - Self-Portrait

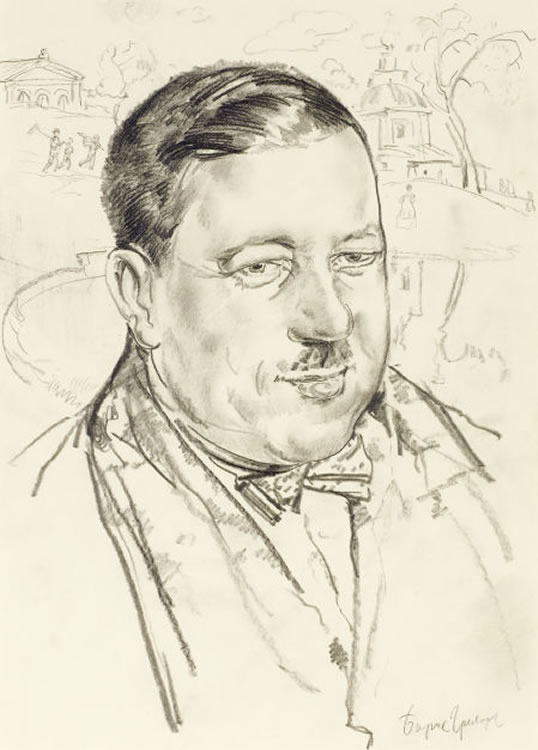
Ilya Mashkov

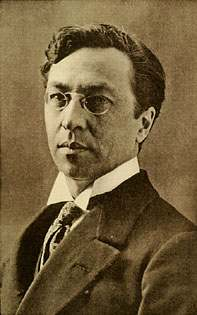
Wassily Kandinsky

== See also ==
- List of Russian artists
- List of painters of Leningrad Union of Artists
- Saint Petersburg Union of Artists
- Russian culture
- 1944 in the Soviet Union

== Sources ==
- Выставка произведений художников союзных республик, автономных республик и областей РСФСР. Каталог. М.-Л., Искусство, 1945.
- Выставка пейзажа. Каталог. М., МССХ, 1944.
- Выставка "Героическая оборона Ленинграда". Очерк-путеводитель. – Л.-М.: Искусство, 1945.
- Выставки советского изобразительного искусства. Справочник. Том 3. 1941—1947 годы. М., Советский художник, 1973.
- Artists of Peoples of the USSR. Biography Dictionary. Vol. 1. Moscow, Iskusstvo, 1970.
- Artists of Peoples of the USSR. Biography Dictionary. Vol. 2. Moscow, Iskusstvo, 1972.
- Directory of Members of Union of Artists of USSR. Volume 1,2. Moscow, Soviet Artist Edition, 1979.
- Directory of Members of the Leningrad branch of the Union of Artists of Russian Federation. Leningrad, Khudozhnik RSFSR, 1980.
- Artists of Peoples of the USSR. Biography Dictionary. Vol. 4 Book 1. Moscow, Iskusstvo, 1983.
- Directory of Members of the Leningrad branch of the Union of Artists of Russian Federation. – Leningrad: Khudozhnik RSFSR, 1987.
- Персональные и групповые выставки советских художников. 1917-1947 гг. М., Советский художник, 1989.
- Artists of peoples of the USSR. Biography Dictionary. Vol. 4 Book 2. – Saint Petersburg: Academic project humanitarian agency, 1995.
- Link of Times: 1932 – 1997. Artists – Members of Saint Petersburg Union of Artists of Russia. Exhibition catalogue. – Saint Petersburg: Manezh Central Exhibition Hall, 1997.
- Matthew C. Bown. Dictionary of 20th Century Russian and Soviet Painters 1900-1980s. – London: Izomar, 1998.
- Vern G. Swanson. Soviet Impressionism. – Woodbridge, England: Antique Collectors' Club, 2001.
- Петр Фомин. Живопись. Воспоминания современников. СПб., 2002. С.107.
- Время перемен. Искусство 1960—1985 в Советском Союзе. СПб., Государственный Русский музей, 2006.
- Sergei V. Ivanov. Unknown Socialist Realism. The Leningrad School. – Saint-Petersburg: NP-Print Edition, 2007. – ISBN 5-901724-21-6, ISBN 978-5-901724-21-7.
- Anniversary Directory graduates of Saint Petersburg State Academic Institute of Painting, Sculpture, and Architecture named after Ilya Repin, Russian Academy of Arts. 1915 – 2005. – Saint Petersburg: Pervotsvet Publishing House, 2007.
