= Into the Jaws of Death =

Photograph of the 1944 Normandy landings

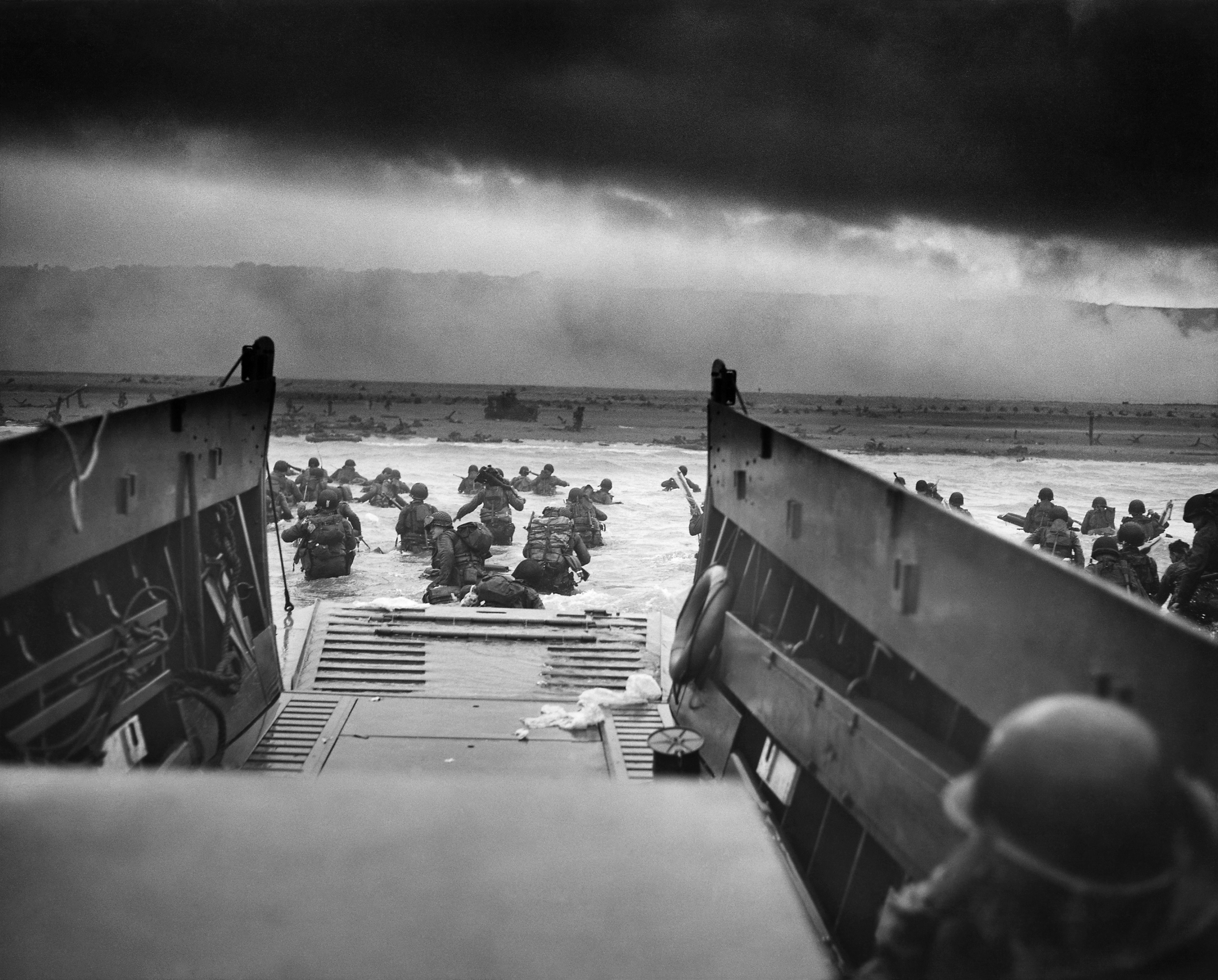
Into the Jaws of Death by Robert F. Sargent Original caption: Down the ramp of a Coast Guard landing barge Yankee soldiers storm toward the beach-sweeping fire of Nazi defenders in the D-Day invasion of the French Coast. Troops ahead may be seen lying flat under the deadly machinegun resistance of the Germans.

Into the Jaws of Death is a photograph taken on June 6, 1944, by Robert F. Sargent, a chief photographer's mate in the United States Coast Guard. It depicts soldiers of the U.S. Army's 1st Infantry Division disembarking from an LCVP from the U.S. Coast Guard-crewed USS Samuel Chase at Omaha Beach during the Normandy landings in World War II. Sometimes appearing with the title Taxis to Hell—and Back, it is regarded as one of the defining images of World War II.

== The photograph ==
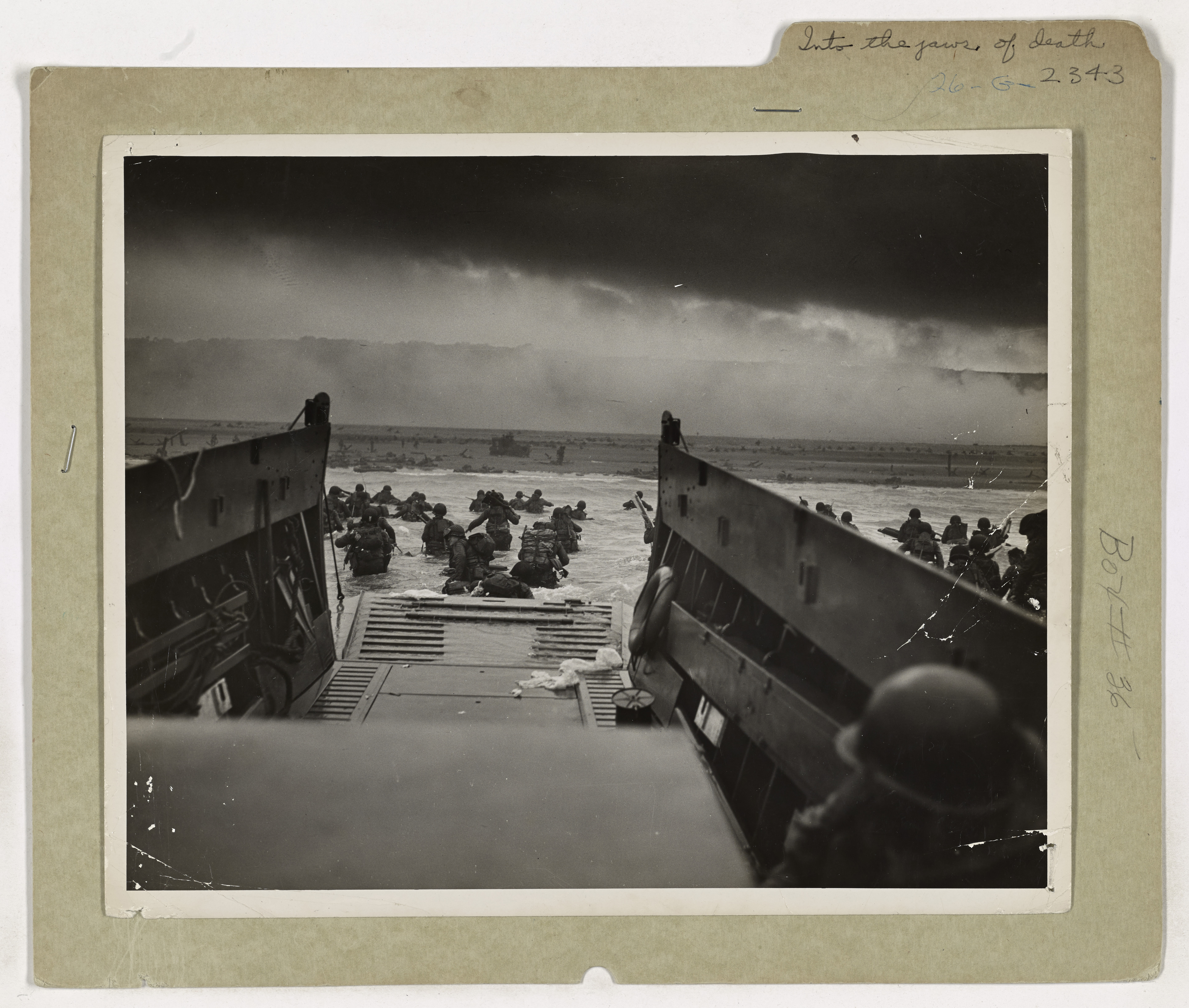
Original print of Into the Jaws of Death, photographed at the National Archives and Records Administration on top of the enclosing folder which bears the image title

The photograph was taken by Chief Photographer's Mate Robert F. Sargent during the troop landing phase of Operation Neptune, the naval component of the Operation Overlord Normandy landing commonly known as D-Day. The photograph was taken at 7:40 am local time. It depicts the soldiers departing the Higgins boat and wading through waist-deep water towards the "Easy Red" sector of Omaha Beach. It shows troops of Company E, 16th Infantry, 1st Infantry Division landing on Omaha Beach from a U.S. Coast Guard landing craft (from the U.S. Coast Guard-manned USS Samuel Chase) on D-Day.

The image is one of the most widely reproduced photographs of the D-Day landings. Original prints are held by the United States Coast Guard Historian's Office and the National Archives and Records Administration, in Washington, D.C..

== Background ==
Neptune was the largest combat operation ever performed by the United States Coast Guard.

The Higgins boat depicted in the photograph had departed from the attack transport USS Samuel Chase about 10 miles (8.7 nmi; 16 km) from the coast of Normandy at around 5:30 am. Waves continuously broke over the boat's square bow, and the soldiers inside were drenched in cold ocean water.

In all, Samuel Chase lost six landing craft on D-Day; four foundered near the beach, one was "impaled" by a beach obstacle, and another was sunk by enemy gunfire.

== Origin of the phrase ==
The phrase "into the jaws of Death" in the photograph's caption comes from a refrain in "The Charge of the Light Brigade", an 1854 narrative poem by Alfred, Lord Tennyson about the Charge of the Light Brigade at the Battle of Balaclava during the Crimean War.

== In popular culture ==
The photograph is shown in the closing moments of the 2025 television documentary miniseries The American Revolution, directed by Ken Burns, Sarah Botstein and David Schmidt.

The image was evoked in the 1998 Hollywood film Saving Private Ryan, and appears on the cover of Stanley Lombardo's 1997 English translation of the Iliad as a symbol of the universality of war.

== Robert F. Sargent ==
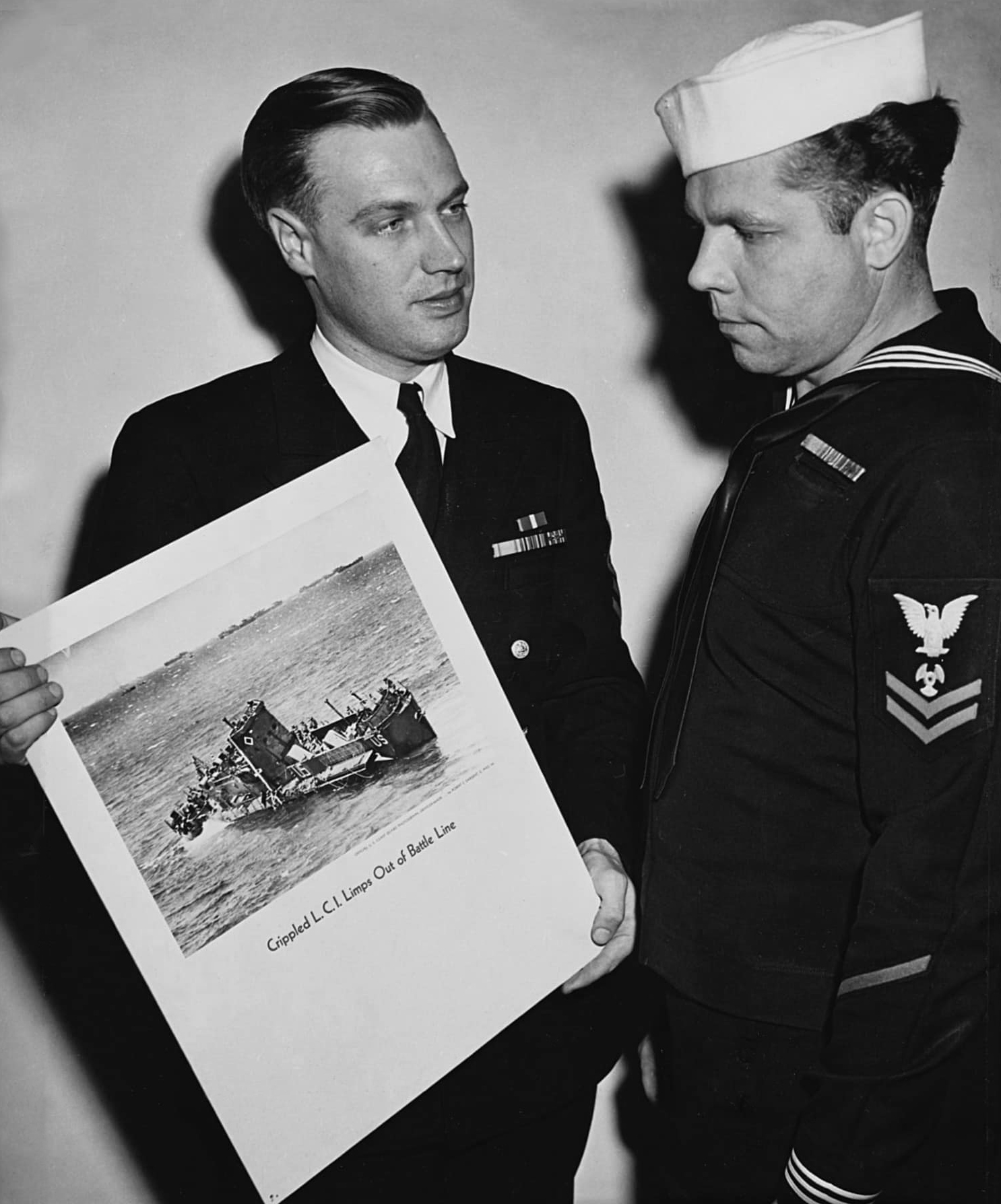
Sargent (left) shows fellow Coast Guardsman Clyde Wilson a photograph of the sinking landing craft that Wilson evacuated on D-Day.

Robert Fred Sargent (July 19, 1918 – March 27, 1969) was a United States Coast Guard chief petty officer, a photographers mate best known for capturing the image Into the Jaws of Death. He was from Summit, New Jersey, and a veteran of the invasions of Sicily, Italy, and Normandy.

=== Gallery ===
These are among the other World War II photographs by Sargent:

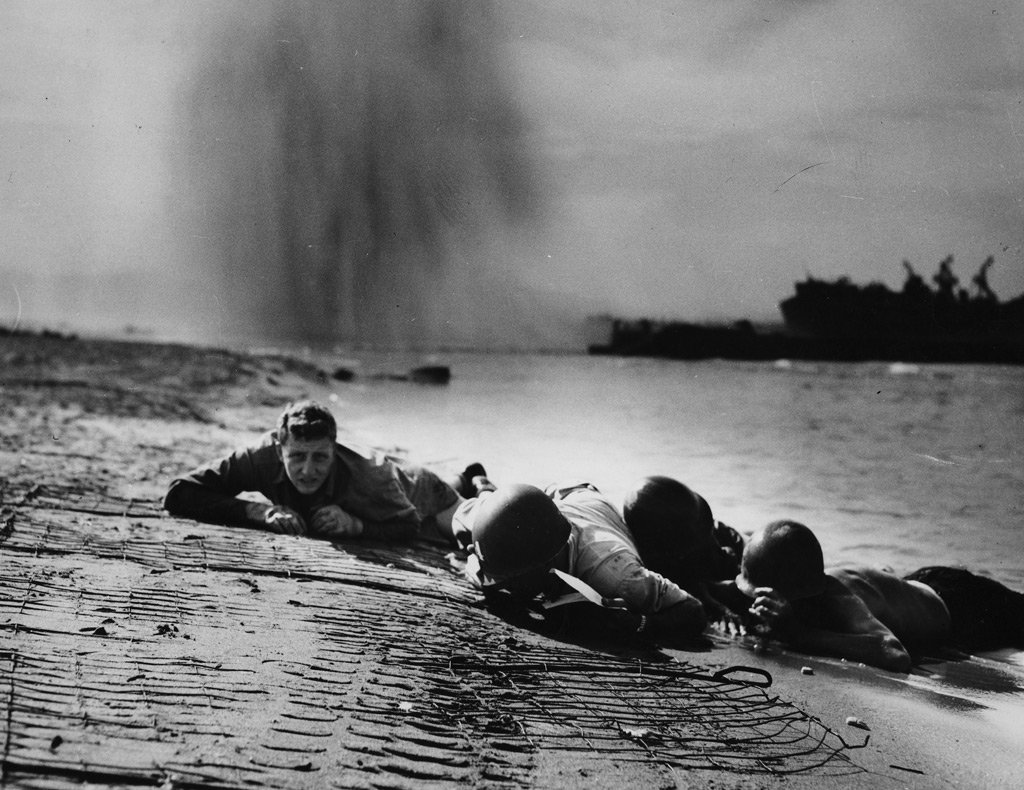
Hugging the Beach at Salerno (September 1943), Sargent's photograph of Coast Guardsmen flat on the sand under German bombardment during Operation Avalanche

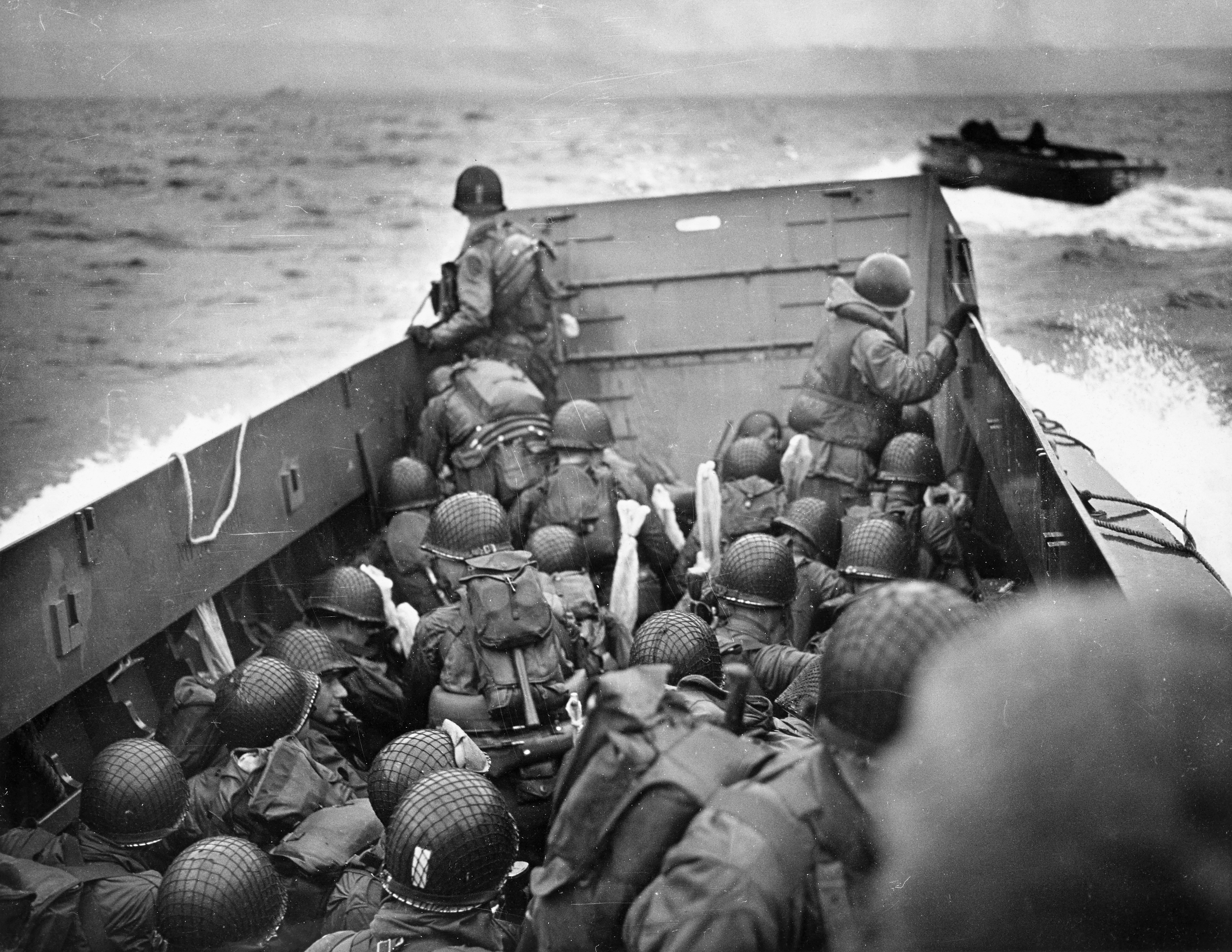
French Coast Dead Ahead, Sargent's photograph of U.S. Army troops crouching behind the bulwarks of a landing craft as it nears Omaha Beach on D-Day

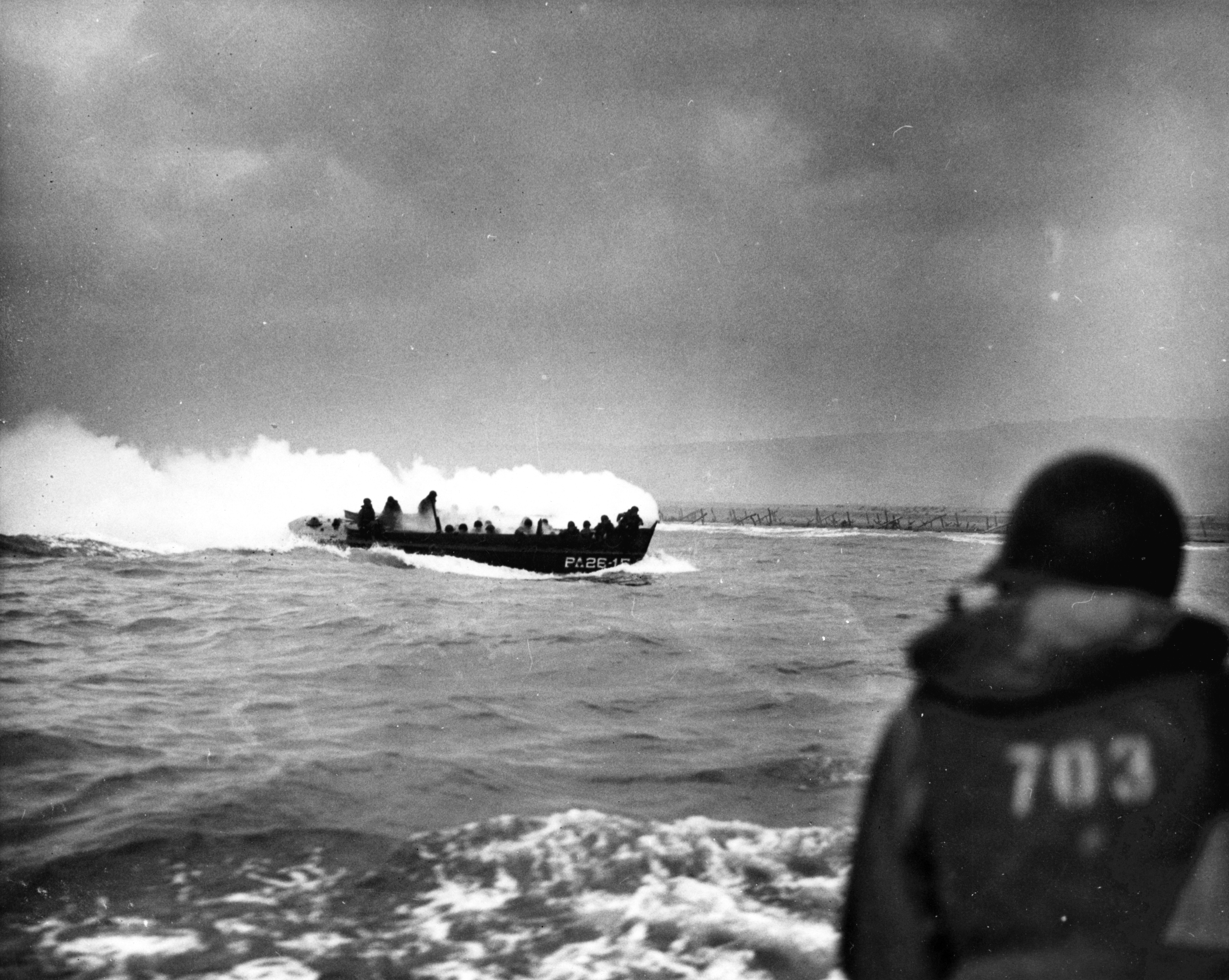
Approaching Omaha Beach, a landing craft from the Chase is drenched in smoke resulting from a German bullet hitting a smoke grenade carried by an American soldier

== See also ==
- List of photographs considered the most important
- The Magnificent Eleven, D-Day photographs by Robert Capa
