= Zoya Krylova =

- Зоя Крылова
- Born: 6 April 1944; Ivanteyevka, Moscow Oblast, Russian SFSR, Soviet Union
- Died: 8 June 2017 (aged 73); Moscow, Russia
- Occupations: Journalist; Politician
- Years active: 1960–2008
- Spouse: Sergei Anatolyevich Krylov
- Children: 1
- Awards: Order of Friendship of Peoples; Medal "For Valiant Labour in the Great Patriotic War 1941–1945"

Zoya Petrovna Krylova (Russian: Зоя Петровна Крылова; 6 April 1944 – 8 June 2017) was a Russian journalist and politician. She worked at the Moskovskij Komsomolets and Komsomolskaya Pravda newspapers and was editor-in-chief of the Rabotnitsa magazine. Krylova was an elected people's deputy of the Congress of People's Deputies of the Soviet Union and a member of the Central Committee of the Communist Party of the Soviet Union. She was a recipient of the Order of Friendship of Peoples and the Medal "For Valiant Labour in the Great Patriotic War 1941–1945".

== Early life and education ==
Krylova was born on 6 April 1944 in the village of Ivanteyevka, Moscow Oblast, Russian Soviet Federative Socialist Republic. She was a 1967 graduate of the evening department of the MSU Faculty of Journalism at the Moscow State University and did her postgraduate studies as a candidate of philosophical sciences at the Academy of Social Sciences under the Central Committee of the CPSU in 1984.

== Career ==
In 1960, she began working in Moscow in a variety of jobs. Krylova was a kindergarten teacher, accountant at the Housing Office in the Zamoskvorechye District, of the People's Court of the Pervomaisky District, courier for Profizdat, duty electrician at the Mosochistvod Trust's pumping substation, collector at the Institute of Geology and Fossil Fuel Development and was a freelance correspondent. She was a literary contributor to the editorial office of the Moskovskij Komsomolets newspaper from 1962 to 1966. Between 1966 and 1981, Krylova worked at the Komsomolskaya Pravda newspaper. She was an intern at first, then became a literary contributor under the column "Ask Zoya" then as head of the student youth department, and then as a member of the editorial board and the scientific youth department. From 1983 to 2008, Krylova was editor-in-chief of the Rabotnitsa magazine.

She became a member of the Communist Party of the Soviet Union (CPSU) in 1973. In 1989, Krylova was elected a people's deputy of the Congress of People's Deputies of the Soviet Union from women's councils, united by the Committee of Soviet Women, serving on the Supreme Soviet of the Soviet Union. She was a member of the Committee of the Supreme Soviet of the Soviet Union on Women's Affairs, Family Protection, Motherhood and Childhood, and of the Central Committee of the Communist Party of the Soviet Union from July 1990 to 1991. Krylova was president of the Charitable Foundation for Assistance to Women "Maria".

== Personal life ==
She was married to the physicist Sergei Anatolyevich Krylov and had a son. Krylova died on 8 June 2017 and her funeral took place the following day at the Novobogorodskoe Cemetery near Elektrougli, in the village of Timokhovo, Noginsky District.

== Awards ==
She was a recipient of the Order of Friendship of Peoples, the Medal "For Valiant Labour in the Great Patriotic War 1941–1945" and two awards of the Russian Union of Journalists.
