= USS Samuel Chase =

Arthur Middleton-class attack transport, 1942–47

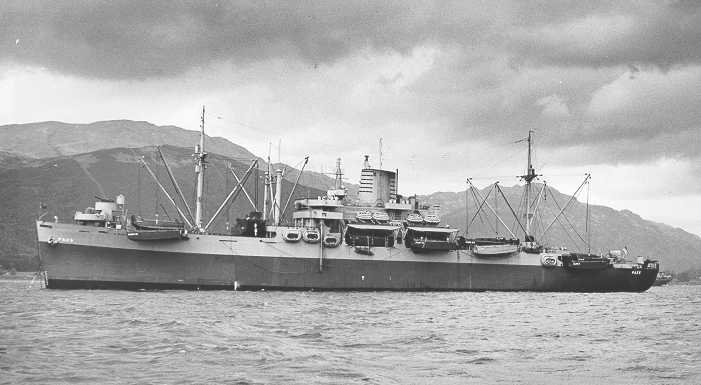
- USS Samuel Chase (APA-26)

History

United States
- Name: African Meteor; Samuel Chase
- Yard number: 266
- Laid down: 31 August 1940
- Launched: 23 August 1941
- Acquired: 5 February 1942
- Commissioned: 13 June 1942
- Decommissioned: 26 February 1947
- Fate: Sold for scrap 9 May 1973

General characteristics
- Displacement: 9,000 to 16,725 tons full load
- Length: 491 ft (150 m)
- Beam: 69 ft 6 in (21.18 m)
- Draft: 26 ft 6 in (8.08 m)
- Propulsion: Steam turbine, single shaft, 8,500 shp (6,300 kW)
- Speed: 18.4 knots (34.1 km/h; 21.2 mph)
- Capacity: 33 Higgins Boats
- Complement: 578 troops; Accommodations:1,304
- Armament: One 5 in (130 mm) dual purpose gun mount; Four 3 in (76 mm) dual purpose gun mounts; Eight 20 mm guns; Four .50 cal (12.7 mm) AA machine guns

USS Samuel Chase (APA-26), launched as SS African Meteor, was an Arthur Middleton-class attack transport manned by the United States Coast Guard during World War II. She was named after Founding Father Samuel Chase, a signatory to the Declaration of Independence.

Samuel Chase participated in all five of the major U.S. amphibious invasions in the European Theater of Operations during World War II, starting at Algiers in late 1942 and following with the invasions of Sicily, Salerno, Normandy, and Southern France before going to the Pacific in 1945. There, she stood duty at Okinawa, under frequent air attack in the aftermath of its invasion, before participating in delivering occupation troops to Japan and repatriating U.S. troops through the middle of 1946.

She was decommissioned in February 1947, laid up in the James River near Fort Eustis, Virginia, struck from the Navy register in October 1958, and transferred to Maritime Administration in February 1959. She remained in the James River Reserve Fleet until sold for scrap in May 1973.

== Construction ==
The ship was laid down under Maritime Commission contract (MC hull 107) on 31 August 1940 as a Maritime Commission type (C3-P&C) hull at Ingalls Shipbuilding, Pascagoula, Mississippi.

African Meteor, MC hull 107, yard hull 266, was launched on 23 August 1941, sponsored by Mrs. Theresa Murray, and was completed 6 February 1942 and delivered to the War Shipping Administration. The Navy purchased the vessel the same day. The ship was commissioned as USS Samuel Chase (AP-56) on 13 June 1942.

== Operations ==
Samuel Chase sailed from Hampton Roads on 18 September 1942. Her first stop was Halifax, Nova Scotia, Canada, to join up with a large convoy, and she arrived at Belfast, Northern Ireland, with a troop convoy on 6 October. On 26 October, she sailed from Greenock, Scotland, as flagship for the landings at Algiers, part of the Allied invasion of North Africa. En route, she was narrowly missed by a torpedo in the same attack that disabled the attack transport, USS Thomas Stone. This was her first of several close brushes with disaster under persistent enemy air and submarine attack in the Mediterranean.

=== Operation Torch ===
The goal of Operation Torch was the capture of the major airfields and ports of North Africa to allow the allies to continue operations from the ground, air, and sea. This was to be accomplished within 24 hours in a three-pronged assault commencing on 8 November 1942, with an expedition to Morocco and landings in Algeria. While the landings were taking place off Morocco, Samuel Chase, under the command of Commander Roger C. Heimer (USCG), landed the first troops just east of Algiers shortly after midnight. Samuel Chase remained off the beach for three days before entering the harbor of Algiers. While lying off Algiers, the expedition's transports were attacked daily, first by bombers and then by torpedo planes. German Junkers Ju 88s came in with torpedoes; one passed under Samuel Chase's anchor chain and hit a Navy transport astern, taking out her rudder and screws. The Chase's gun crews shot down two Ju 88s after they dropped their torpedoes, banked, and came down her starboard side about 100 feet away. Both of the aircraft crashed on the beach.

The landing craft maintained their runs to the beach despite the attacks. The immense size of Samuel Chase made her look formidable to the attacking aircraft, thus she received a disproportionate amount of the enemy's attention. The crewmen of the Coast Guard-manned transport were commended by the British for their antiaircraft defense, and were credited with shooting down three planes. So intense was the fire that the British nicknamed Samuel Chase the "Battleship". The transport sailed on 12 November with a convoy to the United Kingdom to pick up reinforcements, which were disembarked at Algiers on 6 December. Samuel Chase then sailed on 31 December for overhaul in the United States, arriving at Norfolk on 12 January 1943.

She was reclassified as an Attack Transport (APA-26) effective 1 February 1943. At that time, the quad-mount 1.1-inch guns were replaced with dual 40 mm guns. Operation Torch proved to be the turning point in the Allies' war against Germany. After the loss of French Morocco, Germany remained on the defensive for the rest of the war. The capture of North Africa allowed the Allies to begin to plan and prepare for the assault on Sicily, where once again Samuel Chase would play a significant role. Samuel Chase sailed from the United States on 5 March and disembarked troops at Oran on 19 March. During April, her boat crews underwent training on Algerian beaches, and were joined by their ship on 24 May for additional training with the ship's full contingent of troops.

LCDR James W. Paine, USCG, received the Bronze Star for heroic achievement as gunnery officer of USS Samuel Chase during the amphibious landings at North Africa on 8 November through 14 November 1942. By his marked ability and untiring efforts in developing his inexperienced gun crews into a well-functioning unit, he maintained an effective defense of his ship against repeated raids by German aircraft, skillfully controlling the fire of Samuel Chase with the result that one enemy plane was shot down and two others probably were destroyed.

=== Operation Husky ===
Operation Husky, the Allied Invasion of Sicily, involved some 1,400 other ships and over 1,800 landing craft putting ashore nearly one-half million men. In the early hours of 10 July 1943, nearly eight reinforced divisions were to come ashore abreast on a broad front almost 150 miles (240 km) wide. It was a daring plan to send so many men ashore in the initial landings; it had never been tried before and has not been done on this scale since, even at Normandy on D-Day in 1944. For the initial assault on Gela, Samuel Chase lowered 21 boats of troops from the United States Seventh Army. The first three waves came under fire, but the "Lucky Chase" did not lose a man. This was attributed to the Coast Guard's ability to handle small boats and because the landings were actually performed better than those made during the practices. While German planes buzzed overhead, the amphibious craft brought supplies to the beach at a staggering rate. The heavy equipment bogged down on the beach due to the soft sand. Supplies began to pile up, as more and more craft brought supplies to the beach. Aggravating this problem was the absence of the Army unloading details that were frequently called into action. Without the unloading details available, the Coast Guard and Navy crews unloaded the craft themselves. Despite these hindrances, the men from Samuel Chase, for example, made over 250 trips to the beach to land the transport's cargo.

Samuel Chase retired from the beachhead for Algiers with wounded personnel on 12 July. On 9 August, she embarked new troops for amphibious training.

=== Operation Avalanche ===
The objective of Operation Avalanche was to land enough troops in the Gulf of Salerno on the mainland of Italy on 9 September 1943 to establish a bridgehead, capture Naples, and secure the airfields in the area. Samuel Chase served as the flagship of Admiral John L. Hall, commander of the Southern Attack Force. On board were Lt. General Fred L. Walker, 96 officers, and 1163 enlisted men of the VI Corps, 36th and 45th Infantry Divisions. Samuel Chase's landing craft disembarked the troops, while light artillery shelled the beach. After the men landed, the craft made the 15-mile trip to the beach time after time to unload Samuel Chase's 88 vehicles, consisting of 13 two-ton trucks, four halftracks, 251 tons of ammunition, 125 tons of rations, water and engineer's supplies, 44 tons of gasoline, and 2 tons of pyrotechnics. Samuel Chase had a brush with disaster. The attack transport had weighed anchor and was proceeding through the mine-swept channel, when the medium- and high-altitude bombers struck. Six bombs fell close to the transport. Two large bombs fell close enough to splash water on the forecastle and jar the ship, but did no serious damage. She departed Salerno a day later, and after training French troops in landing techniques near Algiers between 22 October and 2 November, returned to the United States on 25 November for repairs.

Captain Roger C. Heimer, USCG, received the Legion of Merit and the Gold Star in lieu of the second Legion of Merit for outstanding services as commanding officer of Samuel Chase during the amphibious assault on Sicily from 10 to 12 July 1943. Chief Boatswain's Mate William G. Lawrence, USCGR, received the Silver Star for gallantry in action while attached to Samuel Chase during the amphibious invasion of the Island of Sicily on 10 July 1943, and of the Italian mainland on 9 September 1943.

Lt Roger H. Banner, USCG, received the Legion of Merit for exceptionally meritorious conduct as officer in charge of a support boat from Samuel Chase during the invasion of Italy 9 September 1943. Courageous and skillful in executing a hazardous task, he successfully escorted 59 amphibious trucks to the beaches under cover of night, and directed unloading of artillery and equipment. Navigating by stars, he continued to traverse the distance of 12 miles between off-shore anchorage and the beaches, continuously exposed to the danger of minefields and shell and mortar fire.

CDR James S. Hunt, USCGR, received the Silver Star for conspicuous gallantry in action while serving as boat group commander of the assault craft attached to Samuel Chase during the amphibious invasion of Italy 9 September 1943. Successfully leading his assault boat crews to the assigned beaches in the Gulf of Salerno, Commander (then LCDR) Hunt expedited the landing of embarked troops and equipment in the face of tremendous enemy opposition. Making an extended reconnaissance in an assault boat beyond the established beaches and under heavy enemy artillery fire on 10 September, he obtained valuable information, which assisted greatly in the effective employment of assaulting forces against strongly defended enemy positions.

After completion of repairs on 26 December, Samuel Chase conducted amphibious training on the U.S. East Coast until departing Norfolk on 12 February 1944 for Glasgow, Scotland, where she arrived on 22 February to prepare for the invasion of Hitler's "Fortress Europe".

=== Operation Neptune ===
Operation Neptune was the code name for Operation Overlord's amphibious assault and naval gunfire support operations. These were divided between two task forces that would get the troops from ports all over Great Britain, land them on the beaches of Normandy, keep them supplied, and give them fire support. The U.S. Coast Guard was an integral part of Operation Neptune. The service's presence centered around Assault Group "O-1" that landed troops of the First Division, the Big Red One, on the easternmost beaches of the Omaha assault area. The two sections of the five-mile-long beachhead code-named "Omaha" were "Easy Red" and "Fox Green" beaches. Samuel Chase supported "Easy Red" beach.

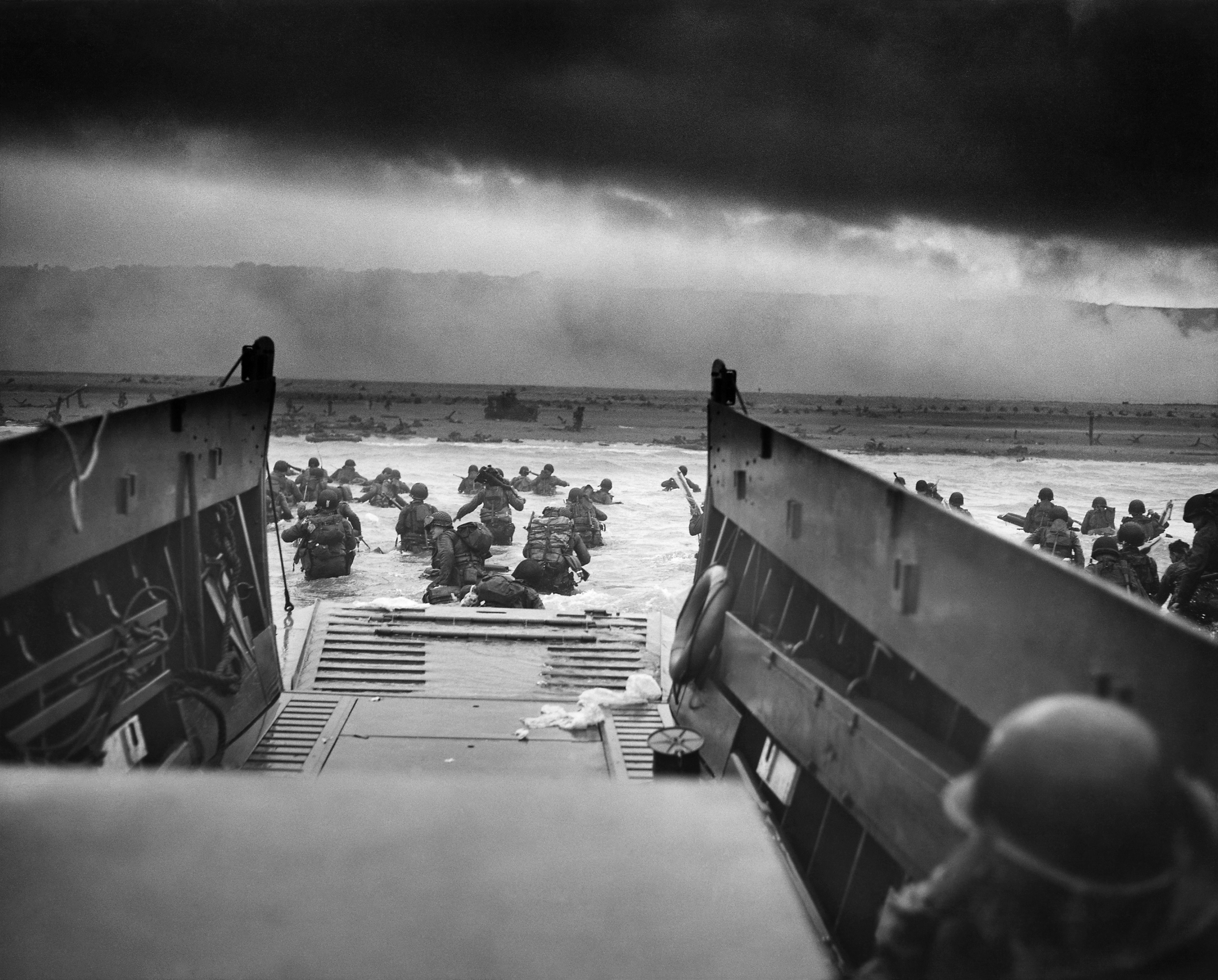
Into the Jaws of Death: Troops disembarked from a Samuel Chase Higgins boat wade ashore under fire on D-Day, photograph by Coast Guard photographer Robert F. Sargent

Commanded by Coast Guard Captain Edward H. Fritzsche, this assault group consisted of Samuel Chase, the United States Navy's USS Henrico, the British Ministry of War Transport Landing Ship, Infantry (Large) Empire Anvil, six LCI(L)s, six LSTs, and 97 smaller craft. Samuel Chase, accompanying attack transports and LSTs of Assault Group O-1, sailed from England and were joined by five LCI(L)s from Flotilla 10 and 10 craft from the Matchbox Fleet. All safely arrived in the transport area, and Samuel Chase's anchor dropped into the channel at 3:15 am. All was quiet on Samuel Chase when the order to "lower away" was given at 5:30 am. All that could be heard was the squeaking of the davits and the quiet whispers of the soldiers as they loaded into the LCVPs. The landing craft were lowered into the swells and headed towards France. Here, too, as at Utah, they were well away from the coast and subjected to the unsheltered waters of the English Channel. All of the Chase's boats got away without incident, but seasickness soon overtook most of the soldiers. They had to go through 11 miles of rough seas, strong currents, and minefields. They soon passed the battleships on their journey in, and the soldiers winced as the 14-inch guns fired. Ernest Hemingway, author, in one of the LCVPs, later wrote about the men, "Under their steel helmets, they looked like pikemen of the Middle Ages to whose aid in battle had suddenly come some strange and unbelievable monster." Samuel Chase launched 15 assault waves, and by 11 am, all of the 1st Division troops aboard had disembarked. LCTs maneuvered alongside and soon all of their equipment was on the way to the beaches, as well. The LCVPs and LCMs returned with casualties who were cared for by the Chase's U.S. Navy and Public Health Service doctors and corpsmen. She returned to Weymouth, England, on 7 June.

Motor Machinist's Mate, Second Class Frank W. Freeman, USCG, received the Bronze Star for extreme devotion to duty and courageous activity, which served to inspire others during the initial attack on France on 6 June 1944, while serving aboard Samuel Chase. Freeman was wounded and his boat driven off by severe fire. When the call for LCVPs to unload LCIs was issued, he went immediately to his boat and despite mental and physical handicap of his wound, he again went into the beach, not returning until the task was completed.

LT Harold J. Mackway, USCG Reserve, received a commendation for meritorious performance of duty and courage under fire as wave commander in the initial attack near Colleville, Bay of the Seine, on 6 June 1944 CG 36149, Serial 0117, issued 6 July 1944.

LTJG Edward R. Tharp, USCG, received the Bronze Star for meritorious performance as assistant boat group commander aboard Samuel Chase during the assault on France on 6 June 1944. Despite enemy gunfire, he closed the beach many times to provide the group commander with valuable data for carrying out the assault.

=== Operation Dragoon ===
Samuel Chase sailed on 4 July 1944 for the Mediterranean to participate in Operation Dragoon, the assault on Southern France. After embarking troops at Naples on 16 July, she landed them in the Bay of Pampelonne on 15 August. She then made several voyages in the Mediterranean, transporting French personnel from Italy and Algeria to ports in Southern France before sailing from Oran on 25 October for overhaul at Boston, Massachusetts, where she arrived on 8 November.

=== Pacific operations ===
Ordered to the Pacific Fleet, Samuel Chase departed Boston on 15 January 1945, reached Pearl Harbor on 6 February, and arrived at Leyte, Philippine Islands, on 4 March. She began amphibious training on 14 March, but struck a shoal during training two days later. She then transferred her troops to USS Pitt, sailed east, and arrived at San Francisco on 24 April for repairs. The transport sailed again on 19 June for the Western Pacific, and after brief stops en route, arrived off Okinawa on 24 July. She remained off the beach there under frequent enemy air attacks that followed the Battle of Okinawa until sailing for Ulithi on 10 August.

After the Japanese surrender on VJ-Day, 15 August 1945, Samuel Chase sailed to San Pedro Bay in the Philippines, embarked occupation troops there between 26 August and 2 September, and delivered them to Yokohama, Japan, on 8 September. She then returned to the Philippines for more troops, whom she disembarked on Hokkaido on 5 October. Returning to the Philippines, she embarked personnel of a Seabee battalion, which she landed at Tsingtao, China, on 1 November. Reporting for "Operation Magic Carpet" duty on 15 November, the transport sailed from Tsingtao on 19 November and delivered a full load of homeward-bound troops at San Diego on 11 December. Coming under the control of the Naval Transportation Service, she made three more voyages to the Western Pacific in the next six months, touching at Okinawa, Hong Kong, Yokosuka, Saipan, Guam, Peleliu, and Majuro. At least one of these voyages (6 April to 15 May 1946, round trip from San Francisco) was dubbed the "Diaper Brigade" by some of the sailors on board, as dependents of occupation troops were carried to join their families.

=== Deactivation ===
The ship arrived at Norfolk, Virginia, on 21 July 1946 for inactivation, was decommissioned there on 26 February 1947, and was laid up in the James River. The transport was struck from the Navy list on 1 October 1958 and transferred to Maritime Administration custody on 11 February 1959. She remained in the James River Reserve Fleet until 10 August 1973, when delivered to the Consolidated Steel Corp. of Brownsville, Texas, after being sold for scrap for $116,660 on 9 May 1973.

== Awards ==
Samuel Chase received five battle stars for her World War II service: North Africa, Sicily, Anzio, Normandy, and Pampelonne.

- Combat Action Ribbon (two awards – retroactive for North Africa and Okinawa)
- American Campaign Medal
- European–African–Middle Eastern Campaign Medal - four battle stars
- Asiatic–Pacific Campaign Medal with one battle star
- World War II Victory Medal
- Navy Occupation Medal with "ASIA" clasp
- China Service Medal
- Philippine Liberation Medal
