= Annelies, White Tulips and Anemones =

1944 painting by Henri Matisse

- Artist: Henri Matisse
- Year: 1944
- Medium: Oil on canvas
- Dimensions: 60 cm × 73 cm (24 in × 29 in)
- Location: Honolulu Museum of Art; Honolulu

Annelies, White Tulips and Anemones is a painting by Henri Matisse from 1944.

The painting depicts a woman smiling at a table with flowers aligned on it. The painting is currently in the Honolulu Museum of Art. During the early to mid-1940s Matisse was in poor health. Eventually by 1950 he stopped painting in favor of his paper cutouts. This is an example of one of the final group of oil paintings in Matisse's career.

== See also ==
- List of works by Henri Matisse
