= Maya Wildevuur =

Dutch painter (1944–2023)

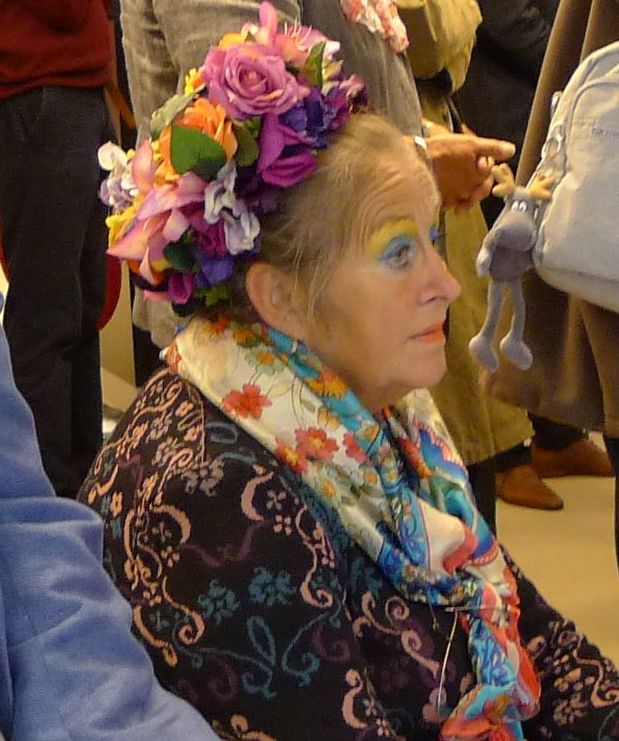
- Born: 24 July 1944; Deventer
- Died: 11 April 2023 (aged 78); Midwolda
- Occupation: Painter, textile artist
- Website: http://www.mayawildevuur.nl/

Martje Lammigje "Maya" Wildevuur (Dutch pronunciation: [ˈmɑrtɕə ˈlɑmɪxjə ˈmaːjaː ˈʋɪldəvyːr]; 24 July 1944 – 11 April 2023) was a Dutch painter. She began making art professionally with flower arrangements and silk landscape collages. She founded art galleries in 1984 and 1992, the former becoming the subject of a long legal battle with her son. She is recognized for her use of bold, contrasting colors in her paintings.

== Biography ==
Martje Lammigje Wildevuur was born in Deventer on 24 July 1944. She attended the AKI Academy for Art & Design (then the Academy for Art and Industry), and founded Maya's kunstnijverheid ("Maya's arts and crafts"), a company that sold flower arrangements. She married early in life to an abusive husband. After her husband was involuntarily committed, she was forced to raise her children as a single mother, and was unable to get a divorce until laws changed in 1973. Shortly after her divorce, she became sick, resulting in paralysis. Her sons were sent to a boarding school while she recovered.

During the early 1980s, Wildevuur made silk collages of English landscapes. Her work at this time became successful enough for her to be able to create art full time. She remarried in 1983 and moved to Hooghalen with her new husband. The next year, she established the Galerie Maya Wildevuur, where she exhibited her work and the works of other artists. The opening exhibition was successful; it was opened by Ad Oele and saw a high turnout.

Wildevuur moved to the Ennemaborgh in Midwolda in 1992 and opened a second art gallery. Her son took over operations of her first gallery after she moved, with eventual disagreements prompting years of legal battles between mother and son. Disputes about their art loan program eventually led to a 2016 court order mandating that Wildevuur pay her son €15,000. She became her husband's caretaker after he was diagnosed with dementia. Her husband died on 15 October 2015. Wildevuur died on 11 April 2023, at the age of 78.

== Style ==
Wildevuur's paintings are primarily of flowers and landscapes, though animals, clowns, and portraits are also common subject matter. She painted the portraits of many prominent Dutch figures, including King Willem-Alexander, Queen Máxima, and Paul van Vliet. Wildevuur's style is known for its strong and contrasting colors and its distinct shapes. Among her inspirations was Emil Nolde, whom she appreciated for his use of color. She described her painting as a way to seek happiness while undergoing difficulty and a way to express herself without having to speak. Her fashion reflected her art style, and she was known for dressing in prominent colors. She is closely identified with her flower bouquet headpieces and her blue eye shadow.
