= Amirkhan Tleumagambetov =

Kazakh collaborator (1908–1944)

- Әмірхан Тілеумағамбетұлы
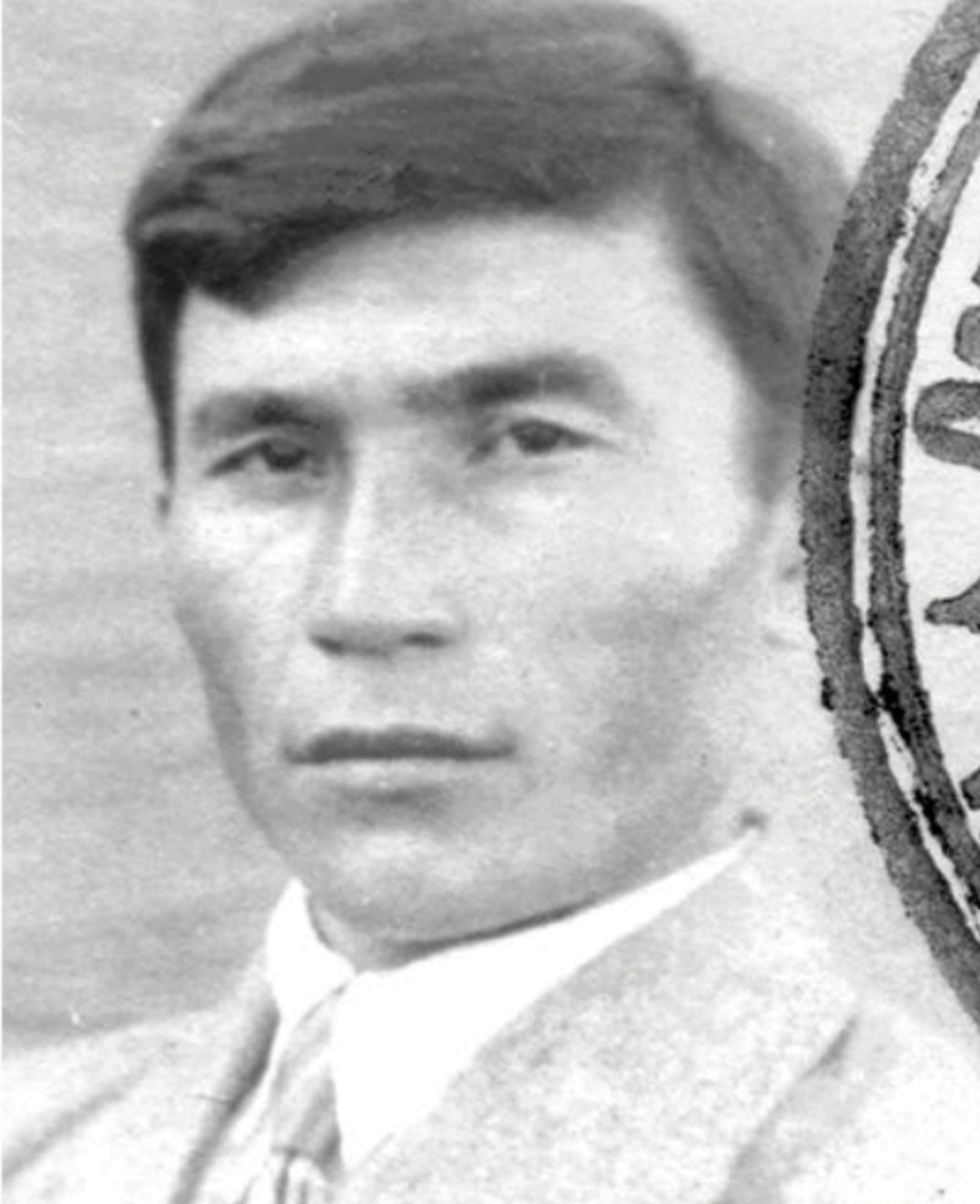
- Tleumagambetov in 1939
- Born: Amirkhan Tleumagambetovich Tleumagambetov; 25 March 1908; Taldykum, Ural Oblast, Russian Empire
- Died: 19 May 1944 (aged 36); Akshelek-Burakol, Aktyubinsk Oblast, Kazakh SSR
- Military career
- Allegiance: Russia (before 1918); Alash-Orda (1918–1920); Soviet Union (1920–1941); Germany (1941–1944)
- Service years: 1941 (Soviet Union); 1941–1944 (Nazi Germany)
- Rank: Senior lieutenant (Soviet Union; deprived); Oberleutnant (Nazi Germany)
- Nickname: Alikhan Agayev
- Conflicts: Second World War; Battle of Moscow; Italian campaign

Amirkhan Tleumagambetovich Tleumagambetov (Note: Russian: Амирхан Тлеумагамбетович Тлеумагамбетов; Kazakh: Әмірхан Тілеумағамбетұлы, romanized: Ämirxan Tilewmağambetulı) (25 March 1908 – 19 May 1944), also known as Alihan Agayev, (Note: Russian: Алихан Агаев; Kazakh: Әлихан Ағаев, romanized: Älïxan Ağaev) was a collaborator who served in the Turkestan Legion as a battalion commander and an Oberleutnant in the Wehrmacht.

== Biography ==
=== Early years ===
Tleumagambetov was born in 1908 in the village of Taldykum, Ural Oblast, Russian Empire. He came from the Ysyk Akay-Maidan clan from the Alshyn tribe.

His father, Tleumagambet, was a middle-class farmer, while his mother Khansulu, was the daughter of a former volost elder named Tleumagambet. His family also had six other children, including Amirkhana. He graduated with honors from a seven-year school in Kyzylkoga District. After graduating from an institute in Aktobe in 1939, he began working as deputy chairman of the district executive committee and as an agronomist. He was later invited to work at the People's Commissariat of Agriculture in Alma-Ata.

=== World War II ===
During the start of the Great Patriotic War, he received a military draft notice while on a business trip in the Shu District of the Dzhambul Region. From there, he departed for the front without having time to visit his family.

According to Tleumagambetov's diary, Chekists concluded that Tleumagambetov, a senior lieutenant and cavalry platoon commander, had been captured during the fighting near Moscow in November 1941, having served in the Red Army for just over a month.

=== Captivity and service in the Turkestan Legion ===
Tleumagambetov was then sent to a prisoner-of-war camp in the town of Stavnau in southern Germany. While there, Tleumagambetov sent a letter to Berlin expressing his desire to establish a unit composed of Kazakh prisoners of war and fight against the Soviet Union. He later fought on the Eastern Front for some time while serving in the Turkestan Legion. The Germans later promoted him to the rank of lieutenant.

He was later stationed at a camp in the town of Luckenwalde, located 52 kilometers from Berlin. At this camp, he selected several Kazakh prisoners of war and went training with them at the secret agents' school known as "Oflag No. 3". Thus began the formation of a sabotage unit. The battalion initially consisted of 40 men. The unit was not part of the Turkestan Legion, which allowed its commander to create divisions within Veli Kayum Khan's organization by accusing him of attempting to discriminate against ethnic minorities and favoring Uzbeks at the expense of other nationalities.

After eight months of active preparation for the landing operation, the battalion was sent to northern Italy to gain combat experience, where it was repeatedly attacked by Italian partisans. In April 1944, the unit was transferred to the town of Cranz near Königsberg. The saboteurs were dressed in Soviet military uniforms, given forged documents and weapons, and then transported to Bucharest. Along the way, they stopped at their permanent base in Luckenwalde, where a farewell dinner was organized. Tleumagambetov then made the following toast to the German officers:

We shall carry out the mission assigned by the German high command with honor. I come from the renowned Adai clan, and i will therefore rouse the entire Adai clan to fight against Soviet power.

— Amirkhan Tleumagambetov (in Russian)

Original quote in Russian
Мы с честью выполним задание высшего немецкого командования. Я из знаменитого рода адай, поэтому подниму весь адайский род на борьбу против советской власти.

Later, during their trial, the captured saboteurs admitted that their mission had been to organize a major anti-Soviet uprising in Kazakhstan and then join forces with the German army. Before departure, the unit was divided into two groups. One was commanded by Tleumagambetov, while the other was led by his deputy, Bisenaliev. The groups, which were parachuted into the area on 3 and 6 May, reunited at Sarkask in Zhylyoi District of Guryev Region. They were attracted to the deserted steppe by the presence of two wells with drinking water.

On 3 May 1944, Amirkhan Tleumagambetov and his battalion landed near Guryev. There, they monitored the area, interacted with local residents in an attempt to persuade them to rebel against the Soviet government, and repeatedly engaged in combat with NKVD security forces. On 19 May, the final skirmish took place in the Akshelek-Burakol area. After a lengthy gunfight, five saboteurs, including Tleumagambetov, were killed. The two remaining saboteurs were captured by Soviet security officers four days later and brought to trial.

== Legacy ==
On 29 August 2024, a memorial plaque was installed at the burial site of an Oberleutnant in the village of Mukyr, Kyzylkoga District.
