= Edward J. O'Donnell (military) =

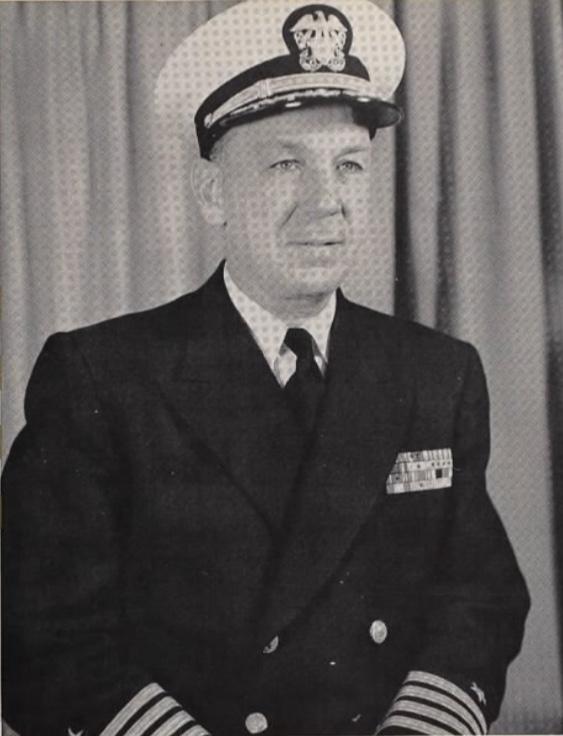
- O'Donnell as a Captain in the 1950s
- Born: April 13, 1907; Boston, Massachusetts, US
- Died: December 9, 1991 (aged 84) Monterey, California, US
- Buried: United States Naval Academy Cemetery
- Allegiance: United States
- Branch: United States Navy
- Service years: 1929–1967
- Rank: Rear Admiral
- Commands: Destroyer Division 32; Naval Forces in Germany; USS George Clymer; USS New Jersey; Destroyer Flotilla 6; Guantanamo Bay Naval Base
- Conflicts: World War II; Korean War; Cuban Missile Crisis
- Awards: Legion of Merit; Gold Star in lieu of the Second Legion of Merit; Bronze Star Medal; Gold Star lieu Second Bronze Star Medal, Combat "V"; Letter of Commendation (SecNav) (Ribbon), Letter of Commendation (ComSoPac) (Bronze Star and Combat "V"); Asiatic-Pacific Campaign Medal with four stars; European-African-Middle Eastern Campaign Medal with one star
- Education: United States Naval Academy (BS); Naval Postgraduate School (Ordnance engineering)
- Spouses: LTJG Ruth Eleanor Hall (USN, ret.) (m. 1944; died 1980); Jeannette C. Carns (m. 1981)

Edward Joseph O'Donnell (April 13, 1907 – December 9, 1991) was an American naval officer. He commanded the Guantanamo Bay Naval Base from December 1960 to 1963, during which the Bay of Pigs Invasion and the Cuban Missile Crisis occurred. He then served as senior navy member of the Military Studies and Liaison division at The Pentagon and superintendent of the Naval Postgraduate School before retiring as a rear admiral in 1967. After retirement, O'Donnell was president of the New York Maritime College until 1972.

Born in Boston, he graduated from the United States Naval Academy in 1929. He then served on various naval ships before taking command of Destroyer Division 32 in the aftermath of World War II. O'Donnell also commanded the USS George Clymer and USS New Jersey. He died in 1991.

== Education ==
Edward Joseph O'Donnell was born and raised in Boston, Massachusetts, and attended Roman Catholic schools there. After graduating high school he attended the United States Naval Academy, graduating in 1929 with a Bachelor of Science degree and averaging academically 83rd out of the 240 midshipmen in his class.

== Early naval career ==
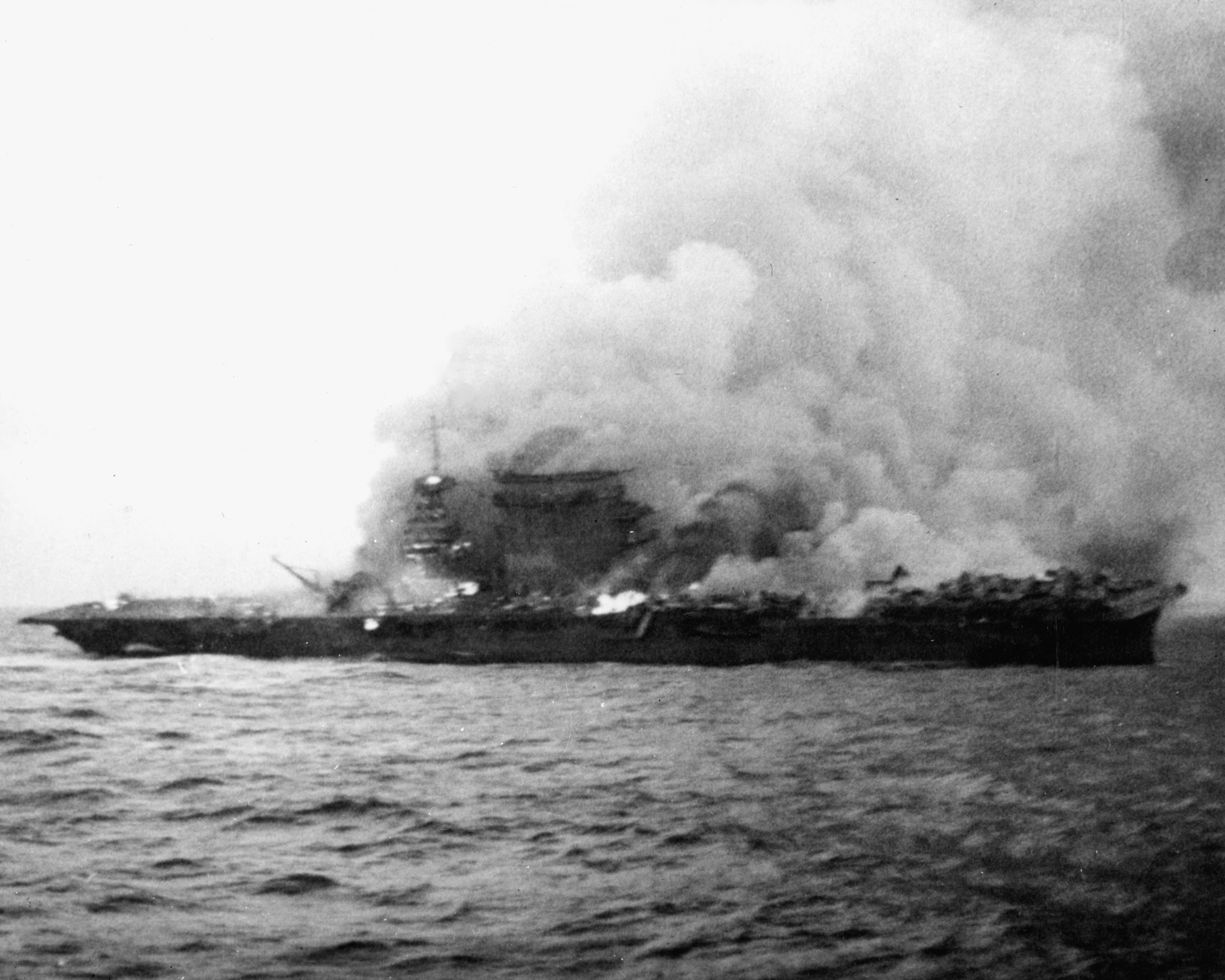
Lexington, abandoned and burning, several hours after being damaged by Japanese airstrikes

O'Donnell's first assignment in the Navy was from September 1929 to May 1930 aboard the USS Florida, working engineering and deck. After service on the Florida and before World War II, he served on board the USS John D. Ford, USS Houston, and the USS San Francisco while doing postgraduate work in ordnance engineering at the Naval Postgraduate School, then in Annapolis, Maryland. O'Donnell served as a gunnery officer on board the aircraft carrier USS Lexington, and served aboard her when she sank during the Battle of the Coral Sea. He later continued serving as a gunnery officer aboard the USS Birmingham, serving on her throughout many of the raids and invasions she participated in throughout the war. On the night of November 8 and 9 of 1943, days after serving in the Battle of Empress Augusta Bay, the Birmingham was subjected to enemy air attacks that damaged the ship. Commander O'Donnell lead the gunnery department to defend the ship, shooting down four aircraft. For his efforts, he was awarded a Letter of Commendation from then Vice Admiral William Halsey Jr., Commander of the South Pacific Area. He was promoted to captain in 1945.

During his postwar years, O'Donnell commanded Destroyer Division 32 and served on the staffs of the Bureau of Ordnance and Commander of Naval Forces in Germany. He then commanded the USS George Clymer in operations off Korea and Japan in 1952 and 1953. O'Donnell next served as commander of the USS New Jersey and was sworn in on March 18, 1955. He also commanded Destroyer Flotilla 6 from June 1956 to October 1957.

From October 1958 to November 1960, O'Donnell served as Director of the Far East Region under the Office of the Assistant Secretary of Defense for International Security Affairs, then headed by John N. Irwin II. O'Donnell served during the tenures of Secretaries of Defense Neil H. McElroy and Thomas S. Gates Jr. in the Eisenhower administration.

== Guantanamo and the Naval Postgraduate School ==
O'Donnell, promoted to a two-star rear admiral in 1957, served as commander of the Guantanamo Bay Naval Base from December 1960 to December 1962, and was serving on the base during the Cuban missile crisis. In April 1961, he commanded the Guantanamo Bay Naval Base during the covert Bay of Pigs invasion. J. W. Davis assumed command of Guantanamo from O'Donnell on December 22, 1962, in a change of command ceremony held at the base's golf course.

After Guantanamo, O'Donnell served as the Senior Navy Member of the Military Studies and Liaison division at The Pentagon under US Secretary of Defense Robert McNamara, and then as superintendent of the Naval Postgraduate School from 1965 to 1967.

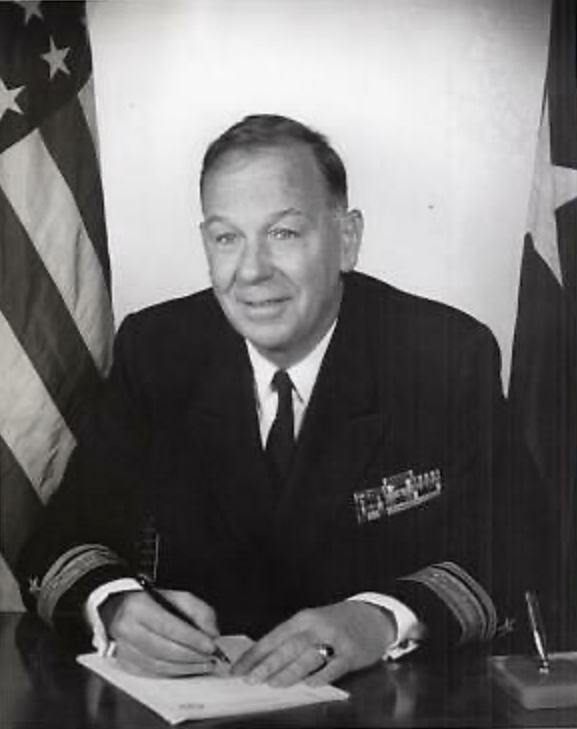
RADM O'Donnell as superintendent of the Naval Postgraduate School.

== After the navy ==
After his retirement from naval service in 1967, O'Donnell served as president of the New York Maritime College in the Bronx for six years, until 1972.

From October 21–23, 1969, O'Donnell testified before the Special Subcommittee on Maritime Education and Training of the United States House Committee on Merchant Marine and Fisheries at the United States Capitol in support of a bill proposed by US Representative William Hathaway (D- ME-2). The bill would amend the Maritime Academy Act of 1958 and increase the contribution of funding from the Federal government to the state governments for maritime colleges. The bill passed successfully.

O'Donnell lived the rest of his life in Monterey, California.

== Personal life ==
O'Donnell was from an Irish Roman Catholic family in Boston and was the oldest of five siblings. His first wife, Ruth, was from Nebraska and the daughter of Robert A. Hall, a Naval officer himself who graduated from the United States Naval Academy in 1912. Ruth was also a Navy officer, commissioned in the Naval Reserve as a lieutenant (junior grade). During World War II, she was a member of the first group of WAVES and served in BUPERS. They had two sons. Ruth died at age 67 in 1980. O'Donnell remarried to Jeannette C. Carns a year later. O'Donnell died of a heart attack on December 9, 1991, age 84 years.
