= USS Euryale =

Tender of the United States Navy

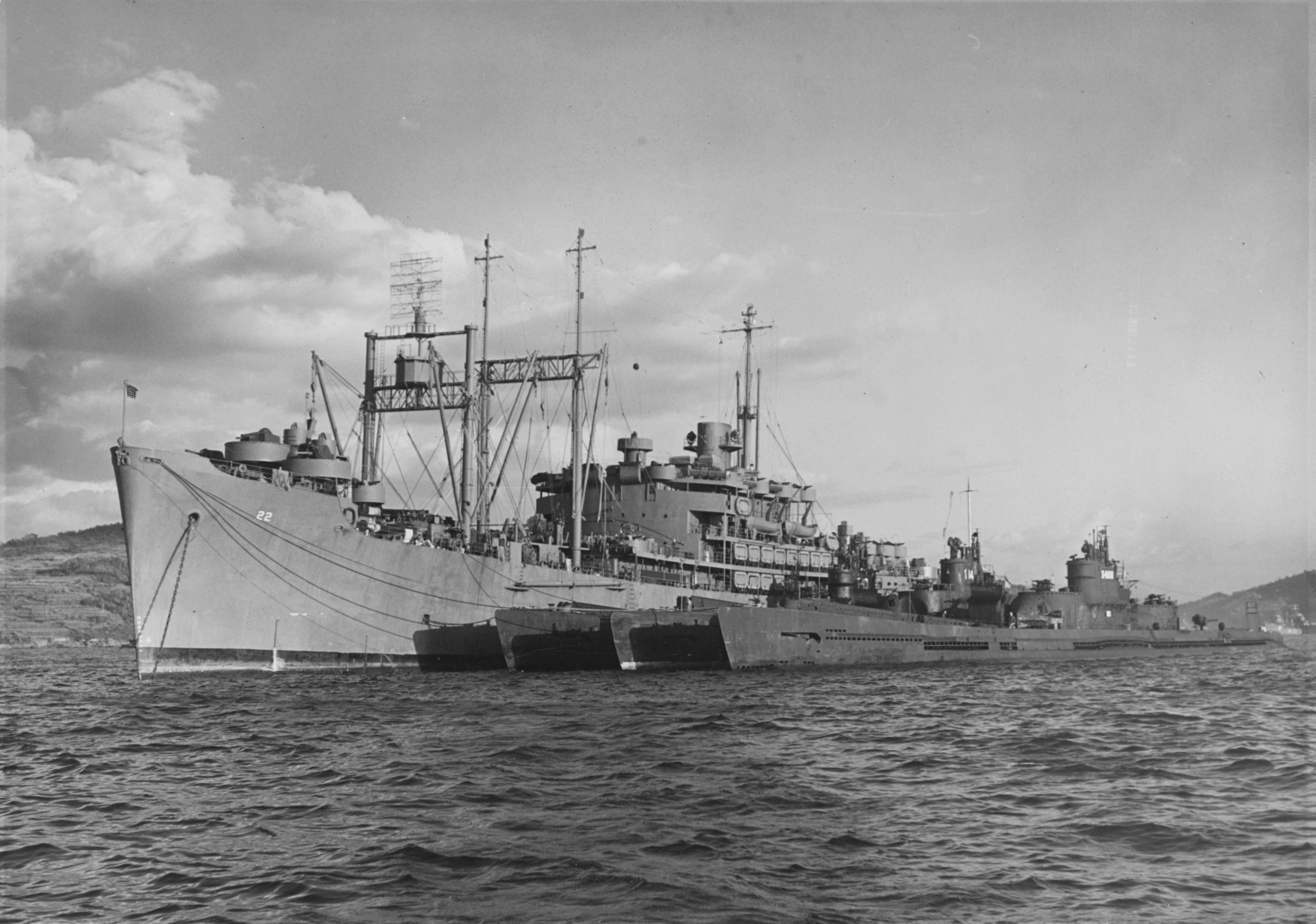
- USS Euryale (AS-22) At Sasebo, Japan, in November 1945. She has three large Japanese submarines alongside. They are (from inboard to outboard): I-401, I-14 and I-400.

History

United States
- Name: Hawaiian Merchant; USS Euryale (AS-22)
- Namesake: Euryale
- Builder: Federal Shipbuilding and Drydock Company
- Launched: 12 April 1941
- Sponsored by: Mrs. Richard A. Cooke
- Acquired: purchased by Navy 15 April 1943
- Commissioned: 2 December 1943
- Decommissioned: 7 October 1946
- Fate: Sold for scrap 9 August 1972
- Notes: United States Official number: 240536

General characteristics
- Class & type: Euryale-class submarine tender
- Tonnage: 7,775 GRT 12,430 DWT
- Displacement: 7,600 tons
- Length: 492 ft 6 in (150.11 m)
- Beam: 69 ft 6 in (21.18 m)
- Draft: 21 ft (6.4 m)
- Speed: 17 knots
- Complement: Matson: 43; Navy: 1,403
- Armament: 1 x 5 in (130 mm), 4 x 3 in (76 mm)

USS Euryale (AS-22) was built as the Hawaiian Merchant by the Federal Shipbuilding and Drydock Company in Kearny, New Jersey for the Matson Navigation Company. Hawaiian Merchant was launched 12 April 1941, minutes after sister ship Hawaiian Shipper, and was completed April 1941. Matson intended the ship to join Hawaiian Planter and Hawaiian Shipper in the U.S. Pacific Coast—Australia route. The ship was under United States Army Transportation Corps charter when the United States went to war and came under the control of the War Shipping Administration which allocated the ship to the Army's continued charter until the ship was purchased 15 April 1943 by the United States Navy and commissioned 2 December 1943 as USS Euryale (AS-22), serving as a submarine tender through the war. Euryale was decommissioned 7 October 1946, going into reserve until 9 August 1972 when she was delivered to the Maritime Administration with immediate sale to American Ship Dismantler, Inc. for disposal.

== Construction and design ==
Hawaiian Merchant was one of four Maritime Commission Type C3 hulls ordered by Matson (Hawaiian Shipper from the same builder with Hawaiian Planter and Hawaiian Packer from Newport News Shipbuilding & Drydock) with custom variants for interior and structure fitted for the intended route and service. In particular, passenger accommodations were eliminated shortening the deck house, there was no raised forecastle and cargo handling increased by addition of two king posts and four winches.

As designed the hull was 492 ft (150 m) length overall, 69 ft 6 in (21.18 m) molded beam, 42 ft 6 in (12.95 m) depth molded to the shelter deck, 33 ft 6 in (10.21 m) depth molded to the freeboard deck with a loaded draft of 28 ft 7.4375 in (8.723313 m). There were seven watertight bulkheads providing for eight compartments, five of which were holds forward of the engine room:

- #1 with a hatch of 20 ft (6.1 m) X 36 ft (11 m) of 115,435 cubic feet (3,268.8 m^{3})
- #2 with a hatch of 24 ft (7.3 m) X 30 ft (9.1 m) of 87,348 cubic feet (2,473.4 m^{3})
- #3 with a hatch of 24 ft (7.3 m) X 37 ft 6 in (11.43 m) of 189,845 cubic feet (5,375.8 m^{3})

and two holds aft of the engine room:

- #4 with a hatch of 24 ft (7.3 m) X 30 ft (9.1 m) of 152,807 cubic feet (4,327.0 m^{3})
- #5 with a hatch of 24 ft (7.3 m) X 40 ft (12 m) of 112,110 cubic feet (3,174.6 m^{3})

There were no refrigerated cargo spaces but deep tanks under #2 and #5 holds had a combined bulk liquid cargo capacity of 1,871 tons.

Steam was provided by two Foster Wheeler "D" type marine water tube boilers at 465 psi delivered to a De Laval steam turbine with 11 high- and 7 low-pressure stages, double reduction geared for a rating of 8,500 shaft horsepower at 85 rpm to a four-bladed bronze propeller of 21 ft 8 in (6.60 m) diameter with 21 ft 8 in (6.60 m) pitch. Two 300-kilowatt 120/240 volt direct current generators driven by steam turbines provided electric power. A diesel 12-kilowatt generator on the shelter deck level provided emergency power.

The ship's fuel capacity was 1,672 tons for a cruising radius of 12,000 miles (19,312.1 km) at 16.5 knots. Water capacities were 68 tons of fresh, 18 tons of distilled and 314 tons of boiler feed water.

== Matson service ==
Hawaiian Merchant was launched 12 April 1941, second in a dual launching and minutes after sister ship Hawaiian Shipper had been launched, with the wife of the head of the Hawaiian Sugar Planters Association, Richard A Cooke, as sponsor. The ship arrived in Los Angeles on her maiden voyage on 22 May 1941 leaving the next day for Honolulu. At that time Matson's freighters were already heavily involved in a buildup in the remote parts of the Pacific supporting construction of military installations, particularly airfields that would allow the Army to fly B-17 bombers to the Philippines by a southern route avoiding the Japanese Mandated Islands in the Central Pacific. Upon the attack on Pearl Harbor Matson's commercial role essentially stopped as it went on a war footing, becoming the War Shipping Administration (WSA) agent for port operations between from the West Coast to Australia, New Zealand and, as the Japanese were pushed back the bases of the Southwest Pacific and Pacific theaters and as agent for WSA ships throughout the world.

== War Shipping Administration/Transportation Corps ==
The ship, already under Army charter, was delivered by Matson to the WSA at San Francisco on 24 January 1942 with allocation to the United States Army under a Transportation Corps charter agreement with Matson acting as agent operator of the ship. (Note: WSA was given control of all oceangoing shipping not owned by one of the services. The Vessel Status Card shows the ship coming under WSA control on 1-24-42 at San Francisco from "Matson Navigation Co. TC" at 8:00 a.m. PST and coming under a "TCA" or Transportation Corps agreement "1-24-42 8'00 AM". In essence it appears WSA simply ratified the TC charter at that time.)

Completion of runway construction at Tafuna, Samoa, scheduled for 1 March 1942 and urgently needed to protect the South Pacific lines of communication with Australia, was dependent on specialized equipment loaded at San Francisco for transport by Hawaiian Merchant which was delayed in the emergency after 7 December and became a matter of concern. On 14 August 1942 3d Battalion, 7th Marines and Battery C, 1st Battalion, 11th Marines were transported from the Wallis Islands, to Apia, Samoa.

== United States Navy ==
Hawaiian Merchant was purchased by the Navy on 15 April 1943 at New York. The ship commissioned 2 December 1943 as USS Euryale (AS-22).

Euryale reached Brisbane, Australia, from New York City 5 March 1944, and after loading provisions and supplies, sailed for Milne Bay, New Guinea. There between 14 March and 26 May, Euryale refitted submarines and repaired surface ships. At Manus from 28 May to 11 August, she established a forward base and rest camp for submariners, clearing the island, constructing buildings and at the same time refitting 26 submarines.

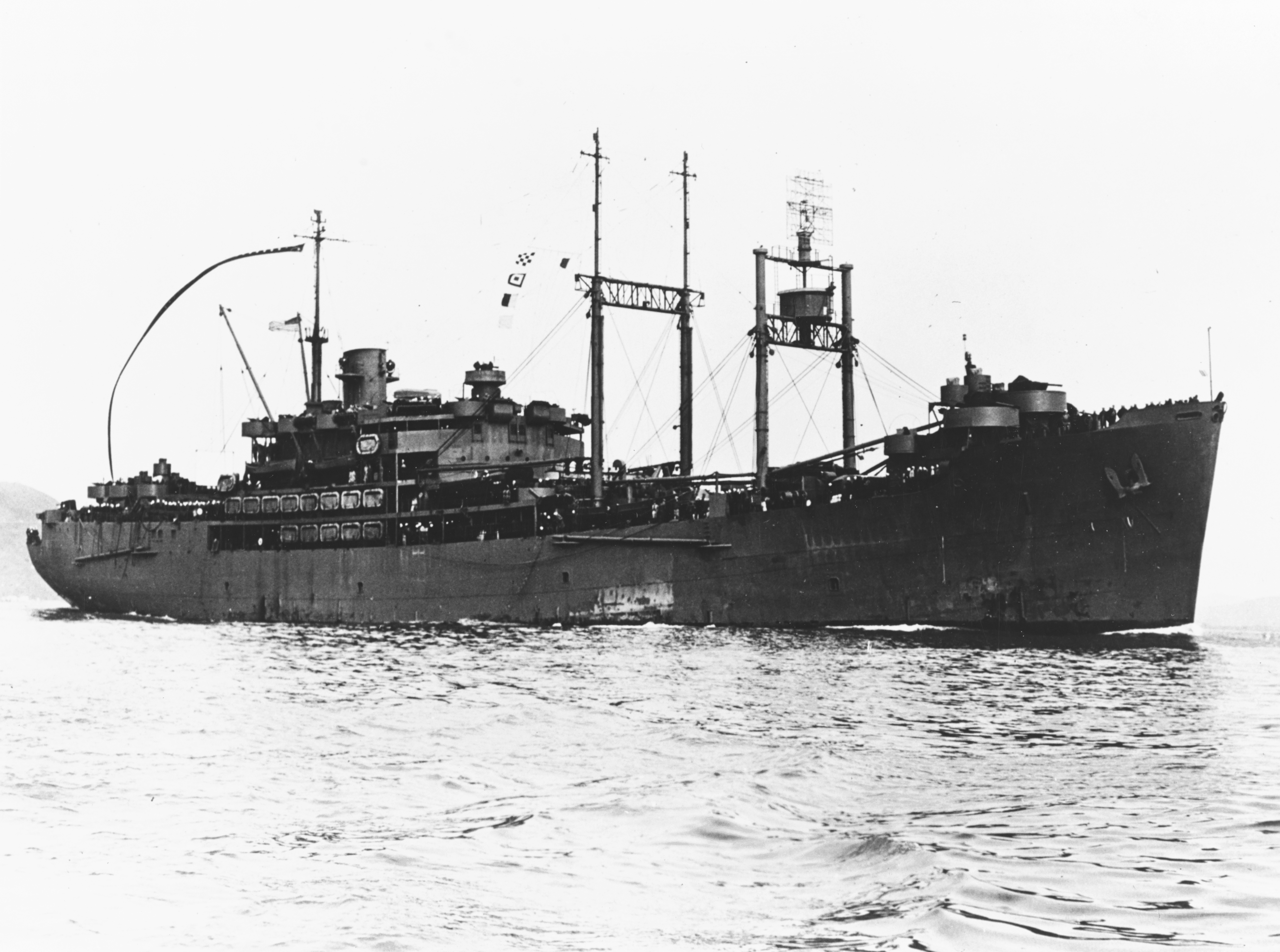
USS Euryale (AS-22) flying her long "homeward bound" pennant, as she arrives off San Francisco, California, c. 22 February 1946

The submarine tender returned to Brisbane on 16 August 1944 to load passengers, torpedoes, ammunition, and general cargo, and with this load arrived at Fremantle on 28 August. She tended submarines there until 11 April 1945, then at Pearl Harbor until 16 August. On 28 August, Euryale arrived at Guam to develop a submarine base and rest camp, and on 16 September sailed for Okinawa and Sasebo. Until 12 January 1946, Euryale worked with Japanese submarines, maintaining them and preparing them for disposal. She crossed the Pacific to Pearl Harbor with a salvage ship and two Japanese submarines, one of which she towed for the last leg of the passage, then continued on alone to San Francisco, where she arrived 22 February.

== Reserve and scrapping ==
Euryale was decommissioned and placed in reserve on 7 October 1946. On 9 August 1972 the ship was delivered to the Maritime Administration at Bremerton, Washington and purchased the same day by American Ship Dismantler, Inc., for "non transportation use" with physical delivery to the company on 30 August.

== Bibliography ==
- Australian Associated Press (1941). "Five Ships—America to Australia". Cairns Post. No. 10 July 1941.
- Dod, Karl C. (1966). The Corps Of Engineers: The War Against Japan. United States Army In World War II. Washington, DC: Center Of Military History, United States Army. LCCN 66060004.
- Maritime Administration. "Hawaiian Merchant". Ship History Database Vessel Status Card. U.S. Department of Transportation, Maritime Administration.
- Naval History And Heritage Command. "Euryale". Dictionary of American Naval Fighting Ships. Naval History And Heritage Command.
- Nimitz, Chester W., Admiral (USN); Steele, James M., Captain (USN) (1942). 'Gray Book' — War Plans and Files of the Commander-in-Chief, Pacific Fleet; Running Estimate and Summary maintained by Captain James M. Steele, USN, CINCPAC staff at Pearl Harbor, Hawaii, covering the period 7 December 1941–31 August 1942. (8 volumes). Operational Archives, Naval History and Heritage Command, Washington Navy Yard, Washington D.C.
- Rill, James C. (2003). A Narrative History of the 1st Battalion, 11th Marines. Military Monograph Series. Merriam Press. ISBN 978-1-57638-317-9.
- "Hawaiian Merchant—Hawaiian Shipper: Federal Stages Dual Launching for Matson Cargo Liners". Pacific Marine Review. 38 (May 1941). San Francisco: J.S. Hines. 1941.
- "Matson Navigation Company Cargo Liners". Pacific Marine Review. 38 (June 1941). San Francisco: J.S. Hines. 1941.
- "The Matson Lines". Pacific Marine Review. 46 (June 1949). San Francisco: J.S. Hines. 1949.
