= Type C3 ship =

Ship type

Type C3
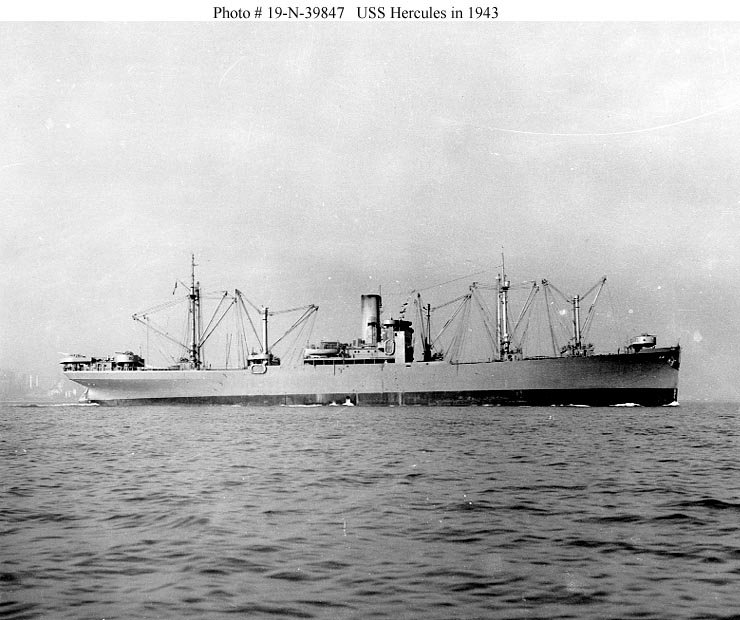
- Exporter, the first C3 ship to be completed. Shown in 1943, after conversion by the US Navy to USS Hercules.

Class overview
- Preceded by: Type C2
- Succeeded by: Type C4
- Built: 1940–1947
- Completed: 238

General characteristics (Type C3 (Steam))
- Tonnage: 7,800 gross tons
- Displacement: 12,000 deadweight tons.
- Length: 492 ft (150 m)
- Beam: 69.5 ft (21.2 m)
- Draft: 28.5 ft (8.7 m)
- Installed power: turbine developing 8,500 hp
- Speed: 16.5 knots (30.6 km/h; 19.0 mph) (designed)

The Type C3 ship were the third type of cargo ship designed by the United States Maritime Commission (MARCOM) in the late 1930s. As it had done with the Type C1 ships and Type C2 ships, MARCOM circulated preliminary plans for comment. The design presented was not specific to any service or trade route, but was a general purpose ship that could be modified for specific uses. A total of 162 C3 ships were built from 1939 to 1946, with an additional 75 ships built with C3 hulls and engines, but not built as cargo ships.

During World War II, many C3 ships were converted to naval uses, particularly as Bogue-class escort carriers, and as Windsor-class and Bayfield-class attack transports, Klondike-class destroyer tenders, submarine tenders, and seaplane tenders.

== Design ==
The C3 was larger and faster than the C1 and C2 contemporaries, measuring 492 feet (150 m) from stem to stern (vs. 459 feet (140 m) for the C2), and designed to make 16.5 knots (30.6 km/h; 19.0 mph) (vs. 15.5 kn (28.7 km/h; 17.8 mph) for the C2). Like the C2, it had five cargo holds.

== Production ==
- Ingalls Shipbuilding, MS: 80
- Seattle-Tacoma Shipbuilding Corporation, WA: 43
- Western Pipe and Steel Company, CA: 43
- Bethlehem Sparrows Point Shipyard, MD: 21
- Federal Shipbuilding and Drydock Company, NJ: 19
- Newport News Shipbuilding and Drydock Company, Newport News, Virginia: 10
- Bethlehem Fore River, MA: 8
- Sun Shipbuilding & Drydock Co., PA: 8
- Moore Dry Dock Company, CA: 4
- Tampa Shipbuilding Company, FL: 2

== Ships in type ==
Subtypes of C3 Type ships
Type	Total	DWT	Builders	Example
C3	12 4	12,595		Elizabeth C. Stanton-class (AP 4 hulls)
C-3 P&C C3-A P&C	5 1	10,000	Newport News, VA	USS President Monroe USS President Polk
C3-E	8	9,514		USS Hercules
C3 P&C		10,000		
C3-S-A1		12,595		Bogue-class escort carriers
C3-S-A2		12,595		Bayfield-class (AP 16 hulls, APA 16+18); Aegir-class (AS 4 hulls)
C3-S-A3		7,336		USS Queens
C3-S-A4		11,000		
C3-S-A5	7	11,800		
C3-S-BH1	5	11,800		
C3-S-BH2	6	11,800		
C3-S-DX1	1	10,500		SS Schuyler Otis Bland
C3-S1-A3	2	12,595		USS James O'Hara
C3-S1-BR1	3	9,900		SS Del Norte

- C3 Mod. DWT 12,430, as in USS Euryale
- C3 multiple or unverified sub-types
  - Klondike-class (AD 4 hulls)
  - President Jackson-class (AP 2+5 hulls, APA 5)
  - Windsor-class (AP 1 hull, APA 8+1)
  - Kenneth Whiting-class (AV 4 hulls)

=== World War II designs ===
- C3
  - The original C3 type, powered by steam turbines, were built at Federal, Ingalls and Moore; 12 ships were built.
  - Four more C3 type, powered by diesel engines, were built at Sun at the request of the United States Maritime Commission to compare similar vessels powered by steam turbines, but would be operated by the Moore-McCormack Lines. The propulsion system was four 7-cylinder SCSA diesel engines (made by Busch-Sulzer Bros Diesel Engine Co.), rated at 8,500 bhp (6,300 kW) total, driving a single screw through electro-magnetic couplings and single reduction gearing. During World War II, all four ships were acquired by the US Navy, with one ship later given to the Royal Navy.
- C3-E — 8 vessels were built at Bethlehem Sparrows Point Shipyard. The C3-E type was based on a private design of the American Export Line, using the C3 hull but had a different stern and was equipped with loading gear for heavy cargo.
- C3 P&C
  - Delta-Type Mississippi Shipping Company
  - Six ships of C3 P&C type and one ship of the C3-A P&C type, intended for commercial service with American President Lines, were laid down at Newport News Shipbuilding between October 1939 and December 1940. The Maritime Commission acquired them all for military service before they were completed, but only five were initially handed to the Navy and designated President Jackson-class transports with "AP" hull numbers. These five vessels were all later converted into attack transports and correspondingly reclassified with "APA" hull numbers.
  - Sun Shipbuilding
  - Ingalls Shipbuilding
- C3-S-A1
- C3-S-A2
- C3-S-A3
- C3-S-A4 — 6 vessels were built to a modified design (based on the C3-S-A2 type) for service with the American President Lines.
- C3-S-A5 7 ships were built for the Moore-McCormack Lines.
- C3-S-BH1 — 6 vessels were built for Lykes Lines. They were based on the basic C3 design, but incorporated lessons learned during wartime, as well as slight structural modifications and major internal changes.
- C3-S-BH2 — 6 vessels (similar to the C3-S-BH1 type) were built specifically for American South African Line (later known as Farrell Lines).
- C3-S-DX1 — Only the prototype (the SS Schuyler Otis Bland) was built.
- C3-S1-A3 — Two ships were delivered to the US Army Transportation Service as transport ships, but after several months of service in this role they were acquired by the US Navy and reclassified as the Frederick Funston-class attack transport.
- C3-S1-BR1 — Three ships (also called the “Del” ships) were combined passenger-cargo cruise ships built for Delta Lines. Designed by naval architect George G. Sharp of New York, they were based on the C3 hull with a custom design. They were built at Ingalls Shipyard in Pascagoula, Mississippi at $7,000,000 each and completed in 1946 and 1947 with new commercial radar. Delta Line (Mississippi) had two departures per month from Gulf of Mexico ports to the Caribbean and South America. Passenger cruise service ended in 1967 and the ships were converted to cargo. In 1975 the three were scrapped in Indonesia.

== Warship conversions ==
=== Long Island-class escort carriers ===
Two Sun Ship C3 ships were converted to Long Island-class escort carriers. Mormacmail renamed USS Long Island and Mormacland renamed HMS Archer both were converted to escort carriers, at a top speed of 16.5 knots (30.6 km/h; 19.0 mph).

== Amphibious warfare ship conversions ==
- 3 Arthur Middleton class
- 4 Crescent City class
- 2 Frederick Funston class
- 9 Windsor class
- 34 Bayfield class
- 7 President Jackson class

== Auxiliary ship conversions ==
=== Delta-class repair ship ===
USS Delta (AR-9), USS Briareus (AR-12)

=== Amphion-class repair ship ===
USS Amphion (AR-13), USS Cadmus (AR-14)

=== Griffin-class submarine tender ===
USS Griffin (AS-13), USS Pelias (AS-14)

=== Submarine tender Euryale ===
Euryale (AS-22)

=== Aegir-class submarine tender ===
USS Aegir (AS-23), USS Anthedon (AS-24), USS Apollo (AS-25), USS Clytie (AS-26)

=== Seaplane tender Tangier, Pocomoke and Chandeleur ===
USS Tangier (AV-8), USS Pocomoke (AV-9), USS Chandeleur (AV-10)

=== Kenneth Whiting-class seaplane tender ===
- USS Kenneth Whiting (AV-14)
- USS Hamlin (AV-15)
- USS St. George (AV-16)
- USS Cumberland Sound (AV-17)

== Type C3 specifications ==
Specifications of early Type C3 ship subtypes
Ship type	C3 (Steam)	C3 (Diesel)	C3-E	C3-M
Length overall	492 ft (150.0 m)	492 ft (150.0 m)	473.1 ft (144.2 m)	492 ft (150.0 m)
Beam	69.5 ft (21.2 m)	69.5 ft (21.2 m)	66 ft (20.1 m)	69.5 ft (21.2 m)
Depth				
Draft	28.5 ft (8.7 m)	28.5 ft (8.7 m)		28.5 ft (8.7 m)
Deadweight, tons	12,438	11,928	9,660	12,115
Displacement, tons	5,212	5,689	4,983	5,484
Speed	16.5 knots (31 km/h)	16.5 knots (31 km/h)	17.7 knots (33 km/h)	16.5 knots (31 km/h)
Power	8,500 shp (6,300 kW)	8,500 shp (6,300 kW)	8,000 shp (6,000 kW)	8,500 shp (6,300 kW)

== Notable incidents ==
- Express a C3-E, was torpedoed and sank off the coast of Madagascar on 30 June 1942.
- Almeria Lykes a C3, renamed Empire Condor was torpedoed and sank off coast of Tunisia on 13 August 1942.
- Rio Hudson a C3-P&C, rebuilt and converted to Avenger-class escort carrier. Was renamed HMS Avenger was torpedoed and sank near Gibraltar on 15 November 1942.
- USS Block Island USN CVE-21, a C3-S-A1, was torpedoed and sank near the Azores-Canary Islands on 29 May 1944.
- Rio de Janeiro a C3-P&C, Avenger-class escort carrier, renamed HMS Dasher, exploded and sank in the Lower Clyde in Scotland in 1943.
- The SS Jacob Luckenbach, originally Sea Robbin, sank on 14 July 1953 after a collision off San Francisco in fog with another C3 ship, the SS Hawaiian Pilot (originally USS Burleigh (APA-95)). Both ships were built at Ingalls and were only five hull numbers apart. The wreck was determined in 2002 to be a source of oil pollution and about 85,000 gallons of oil were removed.
- The USNS Card was attacked on 2 May 1964, while moored dockside in Saigon, a North Vietnamese frogman, Lam Son Nao, planted an explosive charge that blew a hole in the hull, killing five crewmen.

== See also ==
- Type C1 ship
- Type C2 ship
- Type C4 ship
- Type R ship
- T1 tanker
- T2 tanker
- T3 tanker
- Liberty ship
- Victory ship
- Park ship
- Fort ship
- Hog Islander
- U.S. Merchant Marine Academy
