= SS Hawaiian Shipper =

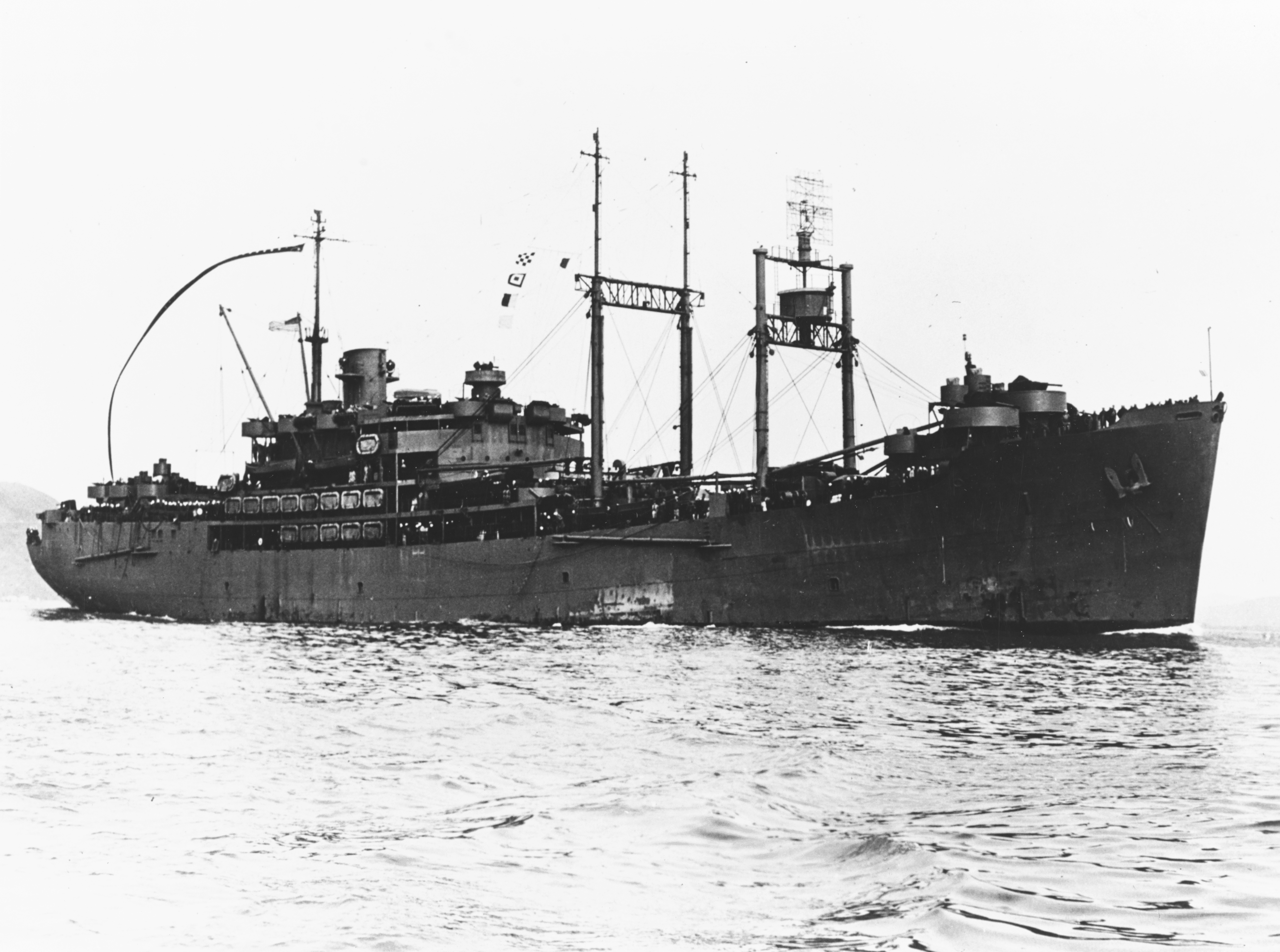
- USS Euryale, formerly Hawaiian Merchant, sister ship to Hawaiian Shipper.

History
- Name: Hawaiian Shipper (1941); Empire Fulmar (1941–42); Hawaiian Shipper (1942–46); America Transport (1946–58); Washington (1958–60); Michigan (1960–69); Morning Light (1969–73)
- Owner: United States War Shipping Administration (1942); Ministry of War Transport (1941–42); United States Maritime Commission (1942–43); United States Navy (1943–46); United States Maritime Commission (1946–48); States Steamship Company (1948–60); United States Maritime Administration (1960–69); Waterman Steamship Corporation (1969–73)
- Operator: Matson Navigation Company (1941–42); Ministry of War Transport (1942); United States Maritime Commission (1942–43); United States Navy (1943–46); United States Maritime Commission (1946–48); States Steamship Company (1948–60); United States Maritime Administration (1960–69); Waterman Steamship Corporation (1969–73)
- Port of registry: San Francisco, United States (1941); United Kingdom (1941–42); (United States) San Francisco (1942-46); United States (1946–59); United States (1959–60); United States (1960–73)
- Builder: Federal Shipbuilding and Drydock Company
- Launched: 12 April 1941
- Completed: May 1941
- Maiden voyage: 26 May 1941
- Identification: United States Official Number 240590 (1941, 1942–73); Code Letters WHEQ (1941, 1942–73)
- Fate: Scrapped

General characteristics
- Class & type: Modified Type C3 cargo liner (1941–43); Troopship (1943–46); Modified Type C3 cargo liner (1946–73)
- Tonnage: 7,730 GRT, 4,540 NRT, 12,585 DWT
- Length: 492 ft 0 in (149.96 m) overall; 465 ft 0 in (141.73 m) between perpendiculars
- Beam: 69 ft 6 in (21.18 m)
- Draught: 28ft 7 7/16in (8.72 m)
- Depth: 33 ft 6 in (10.21 m) (Freeboard deck); 42 ft 6 in (12.95 m) (Shelter deck)
- Installed power: Two steam turbines, 9,350 shp
- Propulsion: Single screw propeller
- Speed: 16.5 knots (30.6 km/h)
- Endurance: 12,000 nautical miles (22,000 km)
- Capacity: Hold 1 115,435 cubic feet (3,268.8 m^{3}); Hold 2 87,348 cubic feet (2,473.4 m^{3}), plus 1,621 tons liquid in bulk; Hold 3 189,845 cubic feet (5,375.8 m^{3}); Hold 4 152,807 cubic feet (4,327.0 m^{3}); Hold 5 112,110 cubic feet (3,175 m^{3}), plus 250 tons liquid in bulk; Total 657,545 cubic feet (18,619.6 m^{3})
- Crew: 43

Hawaiian Shipper was a 7,775 GRT Modified Type C3 cargo ship which was built in 1941 by Federal Shipbuilding and Drydock Company, Kearny, New Jersey for the United States War Shipping Administration. She was transferred to the Ministry of War Transport (MoWT) and renamed Empire Fulmar. She was transferred to the United States Maritime Commission (USMC) in 1942 and renamed Hawaiian Shipper. Converted in 1943 to a troopship for the United States Navy. To the USMC in 1946 and renamed America Transport. Sold in 1958 to the States Steamship Company and renamed Washington. Renamed Michigan and sold to the United States Maritime Administration in 1960. She was sold to the Waterman Steamship Corporation in 1969 and renamed Morning Light, she was scrapped in 1973 at Kaohsiung, Taiwan.

== Description ==
The ship was 492 ft 0 in (149.96 m) overall, 465 ft 0 in (141.73 m) between perpendiculars, with a beam of 69 ft 6 in (21.18 m). She had a depth of 33 ft 6 in (10.21 m) at the freeboard deck, 42 feet 6 inches (12.95 m) at the shelter deck and a draught of 28 ft 7 7/16in (8.72 m). She was assessed at 7,730 GRT, 4,540 NRT, 12,585 DWT.

The ship was propelled by two steam turbines, driving a single four-blade screw propeller of 21 ft 8 in (6.60 m) diameter and pitch through double reduction gearing. The propeller was of cast bronze. It was made by the Cramp Brass and Iron Foundry. The turbines were made by the De Laval Steam Turbine Company. They were rated at 9,350 shp maximum. Driving the propeller at 85 rpm, it could propel her at 16.5 knots (30.6 km/h). Steam was supplied by two Foster Wheeler D type marine water tube boilers. Her range was 12,000 nautical miles (22,000 km).

The ship had five cargo holds. Hold 1 was accessed by a hatch 20 ft 0 in (6.10 m) by 36 ft 0 in (10.97 m) and had a capacity of 115,435 cubic feet (3,268.8 m^{3}). Hold 2 was accessed by a hatch 24 ft 0 in (7.32 m) by 30 ft 0 in (9.14 m) and had a capacity of 87,345 cubic feet (2,473.3 m^{3}). There was a tank under the hold with a capacity of 1,621 tons. Hold 3 was accessed by a hatch 24 ft 0 in (7.32 m) by 37 ft 6 in (11.43 m) and had a capacity of 189,845 cubic feet (5,375.8 m^{3}). Hold 4 was accessed by a hatch 24 ft 0 in (7.32 m) by 30 ft 0 in (9.14 m) and had a capacity of 152,807 cubic feet (4,327.0 m^{3}). Hold 5 was accessed by a hatch 24 ft 0 in (7.32 m) by 40 ft 0 in (12.19 m) and had a capacity of 112,110 cubic feet (3,175 m^{3}). There was a tank under the hold with a capacity of 250 tons. Seven bulkheads divided the ship into eight watertight compartments.

== History ==
Hawaiian Shipper was a Modified Type C3 cargo liner built as yard number 188 by Federal Shipbuilding and Drydock Company, Kearny, New Jersey for the Matson Navigation Company. She was launched on 12 April 1941. The ship was christened by Mrs F. A. Bailey, the wife of the vice president of the Matson Navigation Company. Sister ship Hawaiian Merchant was launched after her. She was completed in May 1941. The United States Official Number 240590 and Code Letters WHEQ were allocated. Her port of registry was San Francisco. Hawaiian Shipper was built for the New York to Hawaii route. Operated under the direction of the United States War Shipping Administration, she was temporarily chartered to the Isthmian Line and sailed from New York on her maiden voyage on 26 May 1941. Her destination was Los Angeles and San Francisco, California. She called at Balboa, Panama, departing on 8 June and arriving at Los Angeles on 16 June. She sailed two days later for San Francisco. Hawaiian Shipper departed on 1 July for Honolulu, Hawaii, sailing from there on 19 July for Sydney, New South Wales, Australia, where she arrived on 13 August. She sailed three days later for Fremantle, Western Australia, where she arrived on 23 August, departing that day for Sydney, where she arrived on 1 September. Hawaiian Shipper then sailed for Honolulu, from where she sailed on 14 September for San Francisco, arriving on 19 September

Hawaiian Shipper was transferred to the Ministry of War Transport and renamed Empire Fulmar. She departed from San Francisco on 5 October for Los Angeles, California, arriving later that day. She sailed three days later for Balboa, where she arrived on 16 October, departing that day for Norfolk, Virginia, United States. Empire Fulmar arrived on 20 October. She sailed on 25 October with Convoy CARGO, which arrived at the Clyde on 4 November.

Empire Fulmar sailed from the Clyde on 22 December for Cape Town, South Africa, from where she sailed on 17 January 1942 for Aden, arriving on 29 January. She sailed on 3 February for Suez, Egypt, where she arrived on 23 February. Empire Fulmar was a member of Convoy KR 1, which departed from Kilindini Harbour, Kenya on 10 March and arrived at Colombo, Ceylon on 20 March. She was carrying a cargo of artillery, ammunition, vehicles and 26 military personnel. She sailed from Colombo on 28 March for Bombay, India, where she arrived on 2 April. She departed on 21 April for Mombasa, Kenya, arriving on 27 April and sailing three days later for Durban, South Africa, where she arrived on 5 May. Empire Fulmar departed the next day for Cape Town, where she arrived on 8 May. She sailed on 12 May for Trinidad, arriving on 27 May and sailing four days later for Baltimore, Maryland, United States, where she arrived on 8 June.

Empire Fulmar was transferred to the United States Maritime Commission (USMC) later that month and renamed Hawaiian Shipper. Her original port of registry, Official Number and Code Letters were reinstated. She departed from New York on 13 July as a member of Convoy AS 4, which joined Convoy WS 21P at sea on 5 August. She arrived at Cape Town on 13 August, sailing three days later for Aden, where she arrived on 29 August. She sailed later that day for Suez, arriving on 3 September. Hawaiian Shipper sailed on 16 September for Aden, arriving on 19 September and departing the next day for Mombasa. She sailed two days later for Beira, Mozambique, where she arrived on 1 October. She sailed on 13 October for Cape Town, arriving on 18 October and departing four days later for New York, where she arrived on 14 November. Hawaiian Shipper sailed for Philadelphia, Pennsylvania on 20 November, arriving the next day.

She was converted to a troopship for the United States Navy. Hawaiian Shipper was a member of Convoy UGF 5, which departed from the Hampton Roads on 9 February 1943 and arrived at Casablanca, Morocco on 19 February. She sailed on 27 February to join Convoy GUF 5, which had departed from Oran, Algeria the previous day and arrived at the Hampton Roads on 11 March. Hawaiian Shipper was a member of Convoy UGF 7, which departed from the Hampton Roads on 2 April and arrived at Gibraltar on 12 April. She sailed on to Oran, arriving the next day. She sailed with Convoy GUF 7, which departed on 18 April and arrived at the Hampton Roads on 30 April. She left the convoy and put in to Bermuda, arriving on 11 May before sailing to New York. Hawaiian Shipper departed from New York on 16 May for Boston, Massachusetts, arriving two days later. She then sailed to Reykjavík, Iceland, departing on 23 June for New York, where she arrived on 1 July.

Hawaiian Shipper sailed from New York on 16 July for the Clyde, arriving on 26 July. She was a member of Convoy TA 54A, which departed from the Clyde on 3 August and arrived at New York on 11 August. She was a member of Convoy UGF10, which departed from the Hampton Roads on 21 August and arrived at Oran on 2 September, returning with Convoy GUF 10, which sailed on 9 September and arrived at the Hampton Roads on 21 September. Hawaiian Shipper was a member of Convoy UT 3, which departed from New York on 8 October and arrived at Liverpool on 17 October. She was carrying general cargo and 2,200 troops of the 15th Field Artillery Battalion, United States Army. She put into the Belfast Lough then sailed on 19 October for the Clyde, arriving the next day. She sailed on 29 October to join Convoy KMF 25A, which had departed from Liverpool on 27 October and arrived at Alexandria, Egypt on 11 November. Hawaiian Shipper left the convoy and put in to Palermo, Sicily, Italy on 7 November. She sailed on 11 November to join Convoy MKF 25A, which had departed from Port Said, Egypt on 31 October and arrived at the Clyde on 24 November. She was a member of Convoy TU 3, which sailed from the Clyde on 30 November and arrived at New York on 11 December. She sailed on 22 December for New Orleans, Louisiana, arriving on 26 December.

Hawaiian Shipper sailed on 1 January 1944 for Cristobal, Cuba, arriving on 6 January. She then sailed to Balboa, departing on 7 January for Bora Bora, French Polynesia, where she arrived on 20 January. She sailed the next day for Nouméa, New Caledonia, arriving on 28 January. She sailed three days later to Espiritu Santo, New Hebrides, where she arrived on 2 February. Hawaiian Shipper departed on 12 February for San Francisco, California, arriving on 26 February. She sailed on 23 March for Milne Bay, Papua New Guinea, arriving on 27 April. She then sailed to Langemak Bay, returning to Milne Bay on 30 April and sailing two days later for San Francisco, where she arrived on 20 May.

Hawaiian Shipper sailed on 3 June for Port Hueneme, California, arriving two days later and departing on 9 June for Pearl Harbor, Hawaii, where she arrived on 16 June. She sailed on 30 August for San Francisco, arriving on 4 September. She sailed on 24 September for San Diego, California arriving the next day and departing on 26 September for Pearl Harbor, where she arrived on 2 October. Hawaiian Shipper sailed a week later for the Enewetak Atoll, Marshall Islands, arriving on 16 October. She then sailed to Roi Island, from where she departed on 25 October for Majuro and Makin, Gilbert and Ellice Islands, arriving on 2 November. Hawaiian Shipper sailed two days later for Pearl Harbor, arriving on 17 November. She departed four days later for San Diego, where she arrived on 27 November, sailing that day to San Francisco, arriving the next day. Hawaiian Shipper departed on 17 December for Langemak Bay. The troops sailing on her had been told that there were plenty of supplies and films on board, but only film available was Orchestra Wives, starring Glenn Miller.

Hawaiian Shipper arrived at Langemak Bay on 2 January 1945, sailing that day for Hollandia, Netherlands East Indies, where she arrived two days later. Hawaiian Shipper was a member of Convoy GI 7, which departed from Hollandia on 26 January and arrived at Leyte, Philippines on 31 January. She returned with Convoy IG 10, which sailed on 23 February and arrived at Hollandia on 2 March. She departed on 4 March for Milne Bay arriving two days later and sailing on 8 March for Pearl Harbor, where she arrived on 19 March. Hawaiian Shipper sailed the next day for San Francisco, where she arrived on 25 March.

Hawaiian Shipper sailed on 11 April for Port Hueneme, from where she departed on 17 April for Pearl Harbor, arriving on 23 April. She sailed two days later for the Enewetak Atoll, arriving on 2 May. She departed the next day, making a return voyage to Saipan, Mariana Islands and then returning to Saipan, from where she sailed on 14 May for San Francisco. Hawaiian Shipper departed on 5 June for Los Angeles, California, arriving two days later and sailing on 9 June for Balboa and Cristobal, from where she sailed on 18 June for Le Havre, Seine-Maritime, France, arriving on 29 June. She sailed three days later for New York, arriving on 10 July. She departed on 17 July for Gibraltar, arriving on 25 July and sailing that day for Naples, Italy, where she arrived on 28 July. She loaded troops bound for Lingayen, Philippines. Hawaiian Shipper sailed on 1 August from Cristobal for Balboa, News of the surrender of Japan reached the ship and her destination was changed. She departed from Balboa on 16 August for New York, where she arrived on 21 August. The last redeployment vessel to transit through the Panama Canal, she brought home 1,819 troops.

Hawaiian Shipper sailed on 7 September for Marseille, Bouches-du-Rhône, France, arriving on 17 September. She sailed the next day for Baltimore, Maryland, arriving on 29 September. She departed on 6 October for Port Said, where she arrived on 19 October before sailing to Suez, from where she departed the next day for Karachi, India, arriving on 27 October. She sailed the next day for Suez and Port Said, departing from that port on 6 November for New York, where she arrived on 20 November. Hawaiian Shipper sailed on 1 December for Port Said, arriving on 15 December and sailing that day for Karachi, where she arrived on 23 December. She sailed the next day for Singapore, arriving on 1 January 1946. Hawaiian Shipper then sailed to Seattle, Washington, where she arrived on 21 January. On 11 April she was placed in reserve at Olympia, Washington.

In 1946, Hawaiian Shipper was returned to the USMC and renamed America Transport. She was sold to the States Steamship Company in 1958 and renamed Washington. She was renamed Michigan in 1960. She was sold to the Waterman Steamship Corporation in 1969 and renamed Morning Light. She was scrapped at Kaohsiung, Taiwan in 1973.
