= USS Deuel =

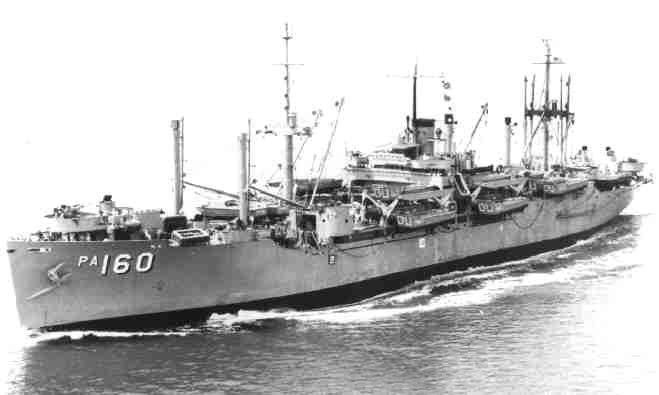

History

United States
- Name: USS Deuel
- Namesake: Deuel County, Nebraska; Deuel County, South Dakota
- Builder: Oregon Shipbuilding
- Launched: 9 September 1944
- Commissioned: 13 October 1944
- Decommissioned: 27 June 1956
- Honors and awards: 2 Battle stars
- Fate: Scrapped 1974

General characteristics
- Displacement: 6,873 tons
- Length: 455 ft (139 m)
- Beam: 62 ft (19 m)
- Draft: 24 ft (7.3 m)
- Propulsion: Oil Fired Steam Turbine; 1 Shaft
- Speed: 17 knots
- Boats & landing craft carried: 26
- Complement: 56 Officers, 480 Enlisted
- Armament: 1 5"/38 gun; 1 40 mm quad mount; 4 40 mm twin mounts; 10 20 mm single mounts

USS Deuel (APA-160) was a Haskell-class attack transport in service with the United States Navy from 1944 to 1946 and from 1950 to 1956. She was scrapped in 1974.

== History ==
=== World War II ===
Deuel was a Victory ship design, VC2-S-AP5 and was named after Deuel County, Nebraska and Deuel County, South Dakota, United States. She was launched 9 September 1944 by Oregon Shipbuilding Corp., Portland, Oregon, under a United States Maritime Commission contract; sponsored by Mrs. J. Himmelright transferred to the Navy 13 October 1944; and commissioned the same day. Deuel sailed from San Diego 25 November 1944, and after training at Pearl Harbor staged at Saipan for the invasion of Iwo Jima. On 19 February 1945 she helped land the 5th Marine Division in the initial assault. She stood off the island for 6 days, embarking casualties for transportation to hospitals at Guam. After replacing her boats at Florida Island, and training at Espiritu Santo, she sailed from Ulithi 4 April to transport support troops to Okinawa where she embarked casualties for transfer to Saipan.

From 28 May to 27 August 1945 Deuel operated in the Philippines on transport and training duty. She carried Army troops to Japan for occupation duty in September, then returned to San Pedro Bay, Leyte to embark more troops and a civil administration party which she landed at Kure between 5 and 11 October. Assigned to "Magic Carpet" duty, she carried servicemen from the Pacific home to the west coast until January 1946, then sailed for the east coast where she was placed out of commission 17 May 1946, berthed at Atlantic Reserve Fleet, Norfolk.

=== Cold War ===
Recommissioned 23 October 1950 Deuel operated from her base at Norfolk on exercises on the east coast and in the Caribbean. In the summer of 1951 she transported an Engineer Boat and Shore Regiment and a Naval Beach Unit to Thule Air Base, Greenland. Between 21 August 1952 and 6 February 1953 she sailed to where she took part in Operation "Mainbrace," the NATO amphibious exercises in Denmark, and then continued to the Mediterranean for duty with the 6th Fleet. Between 5 August and 23 October 1953 Deuel voyaged by way of the Panama Canal to bring Marines to Yokohama, Japan, and in 1952 she delivered naval construction Battalion men and equipment to Casablanca, French Morocco. In 1954 she delivered a battalion of marines for a practice landing on the island of Vieques (southeast of Puerto Rico), then returned to Norfolk. In 1955, as in 1952, she delivered naval construction battalion men and equipment to Casablanca, French Morocco.Deuel was placed out of commission in reserve 27 June 1956.

=== Fate ===
Ex-Deuel was laid up in the National Defense Reserve Fleet at James River, Virginia on 2 June 1959. Ex-Deuel was sold for $310,989 to Luria Brothers & Co., Inc. for scrapping on 7 May 1974. At 1340 EDT, on 10 May 1974 she was withdrawn from the Reserve Fleet and sent to the breaker's yard.

== Awards ==
Deuel received two battle stars for World War II service.
