= Frederick Funston-class attack transport =

Attack transport ship in United States Navy

Frederick Funston class
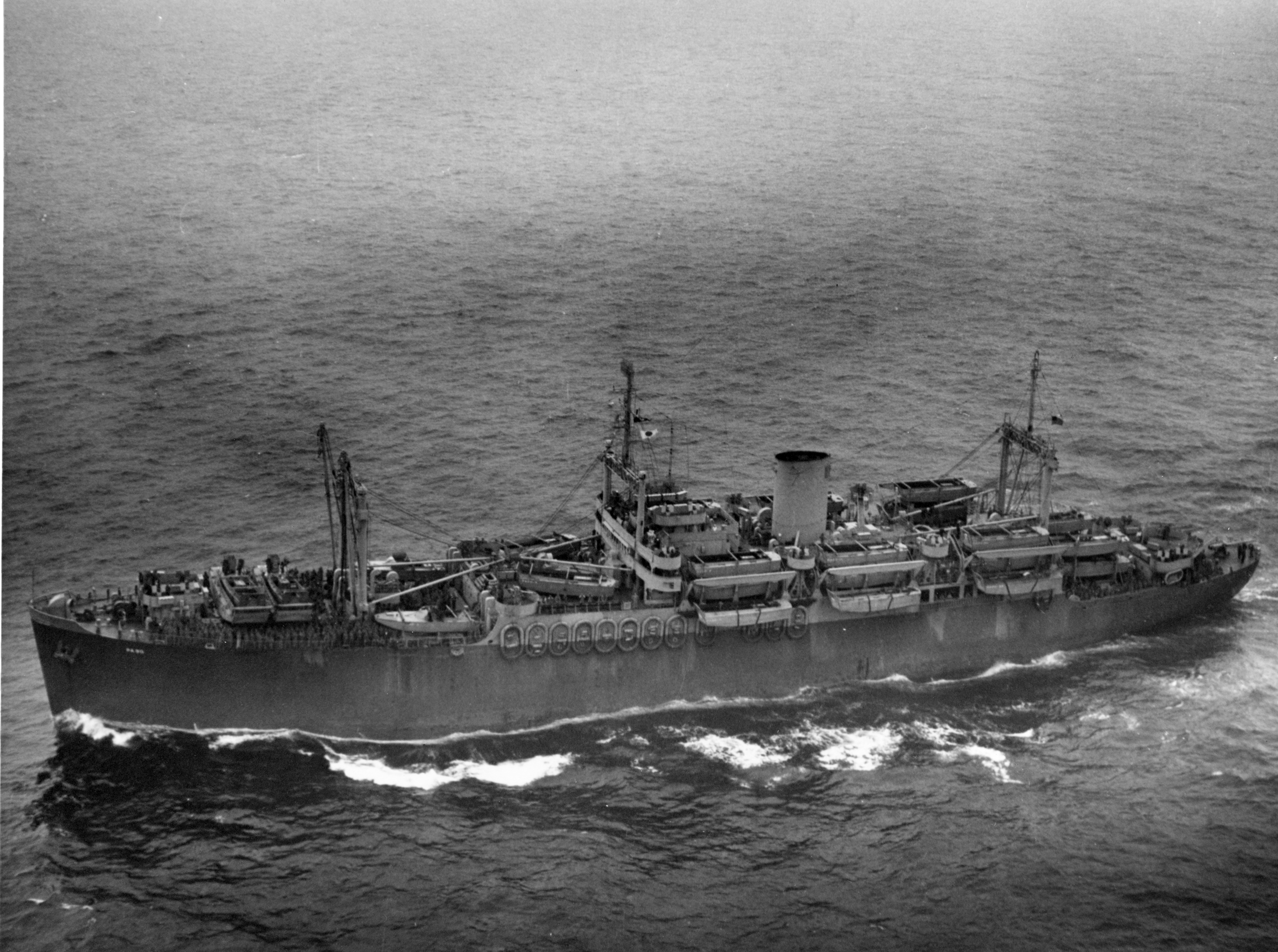
- USS James O'Hara (APA-90), a ship of the Frederick Funston class, at Hampton Roads, 23 August 1943

Class overview
- Name: Frederick Funston class
- Builders: Seattle-Tacoma Shipbuilding Corporation
- Operators: United States Navy
- Preceded by: Arthur Middleton class
- Succeeded by: Doyen class
- In commission: 24 Apr 1943 – 26 Apr 1943 - Probably around 1960
- Completed: 2

General characteristics
- Type: Attack transport
- Displacement: 7,000-8,600 tons (lt)
- Length: 492 ft 8 in (150.16 m)
- Beam: 69 ft 6 in (21.18 m)
- Draft: 26 ft 6 in (8.08 m) (limiting)
- Propulsion: Geared turbine drive, designed shaft horsepower 8,000-8,500
- Speed: 16.5 knots (30.6 km/h)
- Capacity: Troops: 2,200
- Complement: 519-576
- Armament: 1 × 5"/38 caliber dual-purpose gun, 2 × 3"/50 caliber dp guns, 8 × 1.1"/75 AA guns, replaced by 16 × 20mm gun mounts

The Frederick Funston-class attack transport was a class of two US Navy attack transports. They saw service in World War II and later in the Korean War.

Attack transports were a special type of transport ship designed to transport troops and their equipment over long distances to hostile shores, and then execute an amphibious invasion at the destination, using an array of smaller integral assault boats. Like all attack transports, the Frederick Funston class was generously armed with antiaircraft weaponry to protect itself and its vulnerable cargo of troops from air attack in the battle zone.

== History ==
The class derives its name from US Army General Frederick Funston, a veteran of the Philippine–American War and Medal of Honor recipient. The two ships of the Frederick Funston class were based on the Maritime Commission's ubiquitous Type C3 hull (specifically Type C3-S-A1). They began their service lives as transport ships for the US Army, but after several months of service in this role they were acquired by the US Navy and reclassified attack transports. It is not known whether they underwent any modifications for their new role.

There is no mention of cargo space in the DANFS entries, so it is not known how much cargo the vessels carried. The class carried a larger number of troops than most attack transports—2,200 as opposed to the 1,200 to 1,500 of most other APA's.

=== In service ===
The Frederick Funstons participated in the Mediterranean Theatre, taking part in the invasions of Salerno and Italy, and later in the Pacific Theatre. After the war, they were decommissioned and returned to the US Army, when they were redesignated USAT (US Army Transport). In the 1950s the ships were reacquired by the Navy and reclassified T-AP. Both of them then went on to serve in the Korean War - mostly on transport missions.

James O'Hara was struck from the Naval Register in 1961. Both vessels were scrapped in 1968–69.
