= St. Julien's Creek Annex =

U.S. naval support facility

Coordinates: 36°47′20″N 76°18′50″W

St. Julien's Creek Annex (SJCA) is a U.S. naval support facility that provides administrative offices, light industrial shops, and storage facilities for tenant naval commands. Its primary mission is to provide a radar testing range (35 acres or 141,640 m^{2}) and various administrative and warehousing structures for the Norfolk Naval Station.

== Location ==
St. Julien's Creek Annex is a 490-acre facility located in southeastern Virginia at the confluence of St. Julien's Creek and the Southern Branch of the Elizabeth River in the city of Chesapeake, Virginia. The northern boundary of the annex is next to the Norfolk and Western Railroad, along with the border between Portsmouth, and Chesapeake, Virginia. The Elizabeth River and St. Julien's Creek forms its eastern and southern boundaries, respectively, of the annex. The Norfolk Naval Shipyard is located 1.5 miles to the north.

== History ==
The St. Julien's Creek Annex began operations in 1849 as an ordnance and material storage facility. In 1898, the facility was equipped for assembling ammunition, and until 1970, supplied ammunition to the fleet in addition to loading, assembling, issuing, and receiving naval gun ammunition, and conducting experimental and test loading for new ammunition.

In 1969, St. Julien's Creek was disestablished under U.S. Department of Defense and was consolidated as an annex to the Naval Weapons Station at Yorktown, Virginia. Ordnance operations at the facility were terminated in the 1970s.

In 1977, the annex was transferred to the Norfolk Naval Shipyard. In 1995, it was transferred to Naval Base, Norfolk, and then it was transferred to Naval Station, Norfolk, in 1996.

== Environmental issues ==
The St. Julien's Creek Annex occupies approximately 590 acres (1,647,071 m^{2}) of land, 14 acres (56,656 m^{2}) of marsh, and 69 acres (279,233 m^{2})of surface water. The facility was listed as a Superfund site on July 27, 2000.

Former operations at the facility that generated potentially hazardous substances include metal plating, de-greasing, painting, operation of hydraulic equipment, vehicles and locomotives, ordnance loading, ordnance testing, ordnance disassembly, ordnance destruction, pest control, maintenance of lead-acid batteries, and printing. Trash and garbage generated from the facility was disposed in on-site dumps. Wastes were typically disposed in low areas, which are wetlands.

Beginning in the late 1930s, waste ordnance materials were disposed on site. On-site disposal and storage of waste created numerous sources of potential contamination, including landfills and an ordnance disposal (burning) area.

Sources of potential contamination located on the facility include four landfills, an ordnance disposal area, an ordnance burn pit, a hazardous waste disposal area, a waste storage area, and a pesticide disposal area. These sources were noted because of their potential to release to the surface water surrounding the facility.

== See also ==
- Atlantic Reserve Fleet, Norfolk
