= USS Aegir =

US submarine

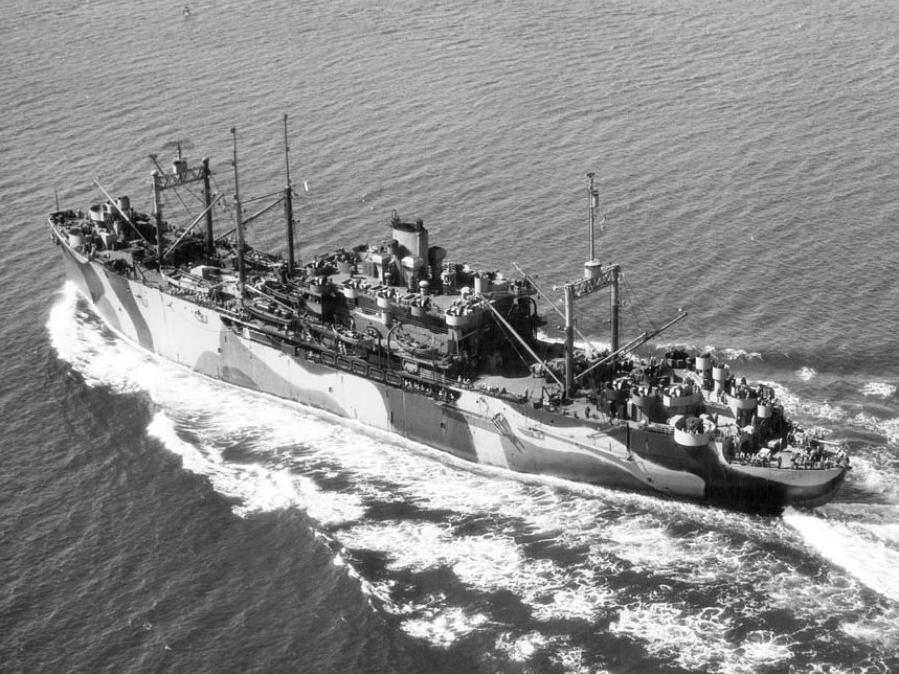
- USS Aegir (AS-23) underway in US coastal waters c. late 1944. US National Archives photo # 19-N-71738, RG-19 LCM, a US navy Bureau of Ships photo now in the collections of the US National Archives.

History

United States
- Name: Aegir
- Namesake: Aegir
- Ordered: as type (C3-S-A2) hull, MC hull 856
- Builder: Ingalls Shipbuilding, Pascagoula, Mississippi
- Laid down: 31 March 1943,
- Launched: 15 September 1943
- Acquired: 20 November 1943
- Commissioned: 20 November 1943 (reduced commission)
- Decommissioned: 3 December 1943
- Commissioned: 8 September 1944 (full commission)
- Decommissioned: 18 October 1946
- Stricken: 1 June 1971
- Identification: Hull symbol: AS-23; Code letters: NWFX
- Fate: Sold for scrapping, 16 May 1972

General characteristics
- Class & type: Aegir-class submarine tender
- Displacement: 16,500 long tons (16,800 t) (full)
- Length: 492 ft 6 in (150.11 m)
- Beam: 69 ft 6 in (21.18 m)
- Draft: 27 ft (8.2 m)
- Installed power: 2 × Foster–Wheeler D-type 465 psi (3,210 kPa) 765 °F (407 °C) steam boilers; 8,500 shp (6,300 kW)
- Propulsion: 1 × General Electric steam turbine; General Electric double reduction main gears; 1 × Propeller
- Speed: 18.4 kn (34.1 km/h; 21.2 mph)
- Complement: 82 Officers 1,378 Enlisted
- Armament: 1 × 5 in (127 mm)/38 caliber dual-purpose gun; 4 × single 3 in (76 mm)/50 cal guns; 2 × twin 40 mm (1.6 in) Bofors anti-aircraft (AA) mounts; 20 × 20 mm (0.8 in) Oerlikon cannons AA

USS Aegir (AS-23) was the lead ship of the Aegir-class submarine tender in the United States Navy during World War II.

== Construction ==
Aegir was laid down on 31 March 1943 under a Maritime Commission contract, MC hull 856, by the Ingalls Shipbuilding Company in Pascagoula, Mississippi and launched on 15 September 1943, sponsored by Mrs. James A. Sweeney. The ship was acquired by the Navy and placed in temporary commission on 20 November 1943 for passage to her conversion yard where she was turned over to the Todd Shipyards Corporation, Brooklyn, New York, for conversion to a submarine tender on 3 December 1943. Aegir was placed in full commission at the Brooklyn Navy Yard on 8 September 1944.

== Service history ==
In early October, Aegir reported to New London, Connecticut for shakedown. On 23 October, the tender got underway for Pearl Harbor via the Panama Canal and San Diego. She reached Hawaii on 18 November and was assigned to Submarine Squadron 24 (SubRon 24). Aegir traveled to Midway later that month. She remained stationed at that island until 1 September 1945. During this period, Aegir furnished refitting and tender services to the submarines of SubRon 24.

Aegir returned to the west coast of the United States on 11 September and was moored at the Mare Island Naval Shipyard. There, she furnished services to submarines awaiting decommissioning. Aegir was placed out of commission, in reserve, at Mare Island on 18 October 1946. Then in 1960 used as a maintenance ship at San Diego PacResFlt and then returned to Mare Island Naval Shipyard and remained there until her name was struck from the Navy list on 1 June 1971. The ship was sold on 16 May 1972 to National Metal and Steel at Terminal Island, California, and scrapped.

== Notes ==
Citations

== Bibliography ==
Online resources* "Aegir (AS-23)". Dictionary of American Naval Fighting Ships. Naval History and Heritage Command. This article incorporates text from this source, which is in the public domain.
