= USS James O'Hara =

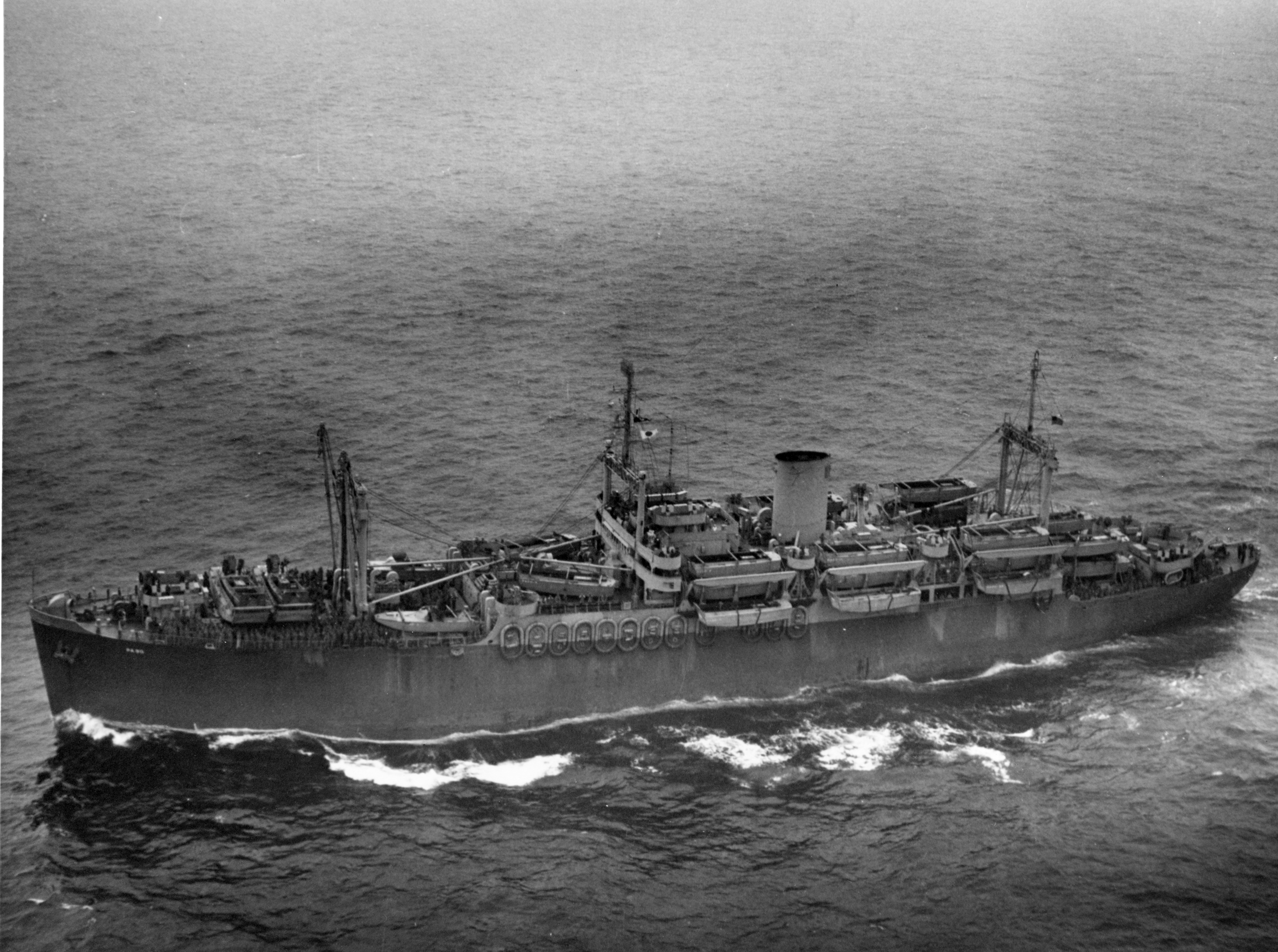
- USS James O'Hara (APA-90) underway, 8 June 1943

History

United States
- Name: USS James O'Hara (APA-90)
- Namesake: James O'Hara, Revolutionary War officer
- Builder: Seattle-Tacoma Shipbuilding
- Laid down: 16 June 1941
- Launched: 30 December 1941
- Sponsored by: Miss Anne B. Denny
- Acquired: (by the Navy) 15 April 1943
- Commissioned: 26 April 1943
- Decommissioned: December/January 1960
- Reclassified: To T-AP-179, 28 April 1950
- Stricken: 1 July 1961
- Honours and awards: Seven battle stars for World War II service, one for the Korean War
- Fate: Scrapped, 1968

General characteristics
- Class & type: Frederick Funston-class attack transport
- Displacement: 8,600 tons (lt)
- Length: 492 ft (150 m)
- Beam: 69 ft 6 in (21.18 m)
- Draft: 26 ft 6 in (8.08 m)
- Propulsion: Geared Turbine Drive, designed shaft horsepower 8,500
- Speed: 16.5 knots
- Capacity: Troops: 2,200
- Complement: 519
- Armament: 1 x 5"/38 caliber dual-purpose gun mount, 2 x 3 in (76 mm)/50 dual purpose gun mounts, 8 x 1.1"/75 caliber guns, replaced by 16 x 20mm gun mounts
- Notes: MCV Hull No. 168, hull type C3-S-A1

USS James O'Hara (APA-90) was a Frederick Funston-class attack transport that served with the US Navy during World War II and later in the Korean War. The ship was named after a Continental Army officer who fought in the Revolutionary War and who later became Quartermaster General of the US Army.

Initially acquired as an Army transport, the ship was soon acquired by the Navy and reclassified an attack transport for the duration of the war, then returned to the Army and redesignated USNS James O'Hara. In the 1950s she was reacquired once again by the Navy and reclassified, serving as USS James O'Hara (T-AP-179) until her final decommissioning.

The ship was laid down for the Army under Maritime Commission contract by Seattle-Tacoma Shipbuilding Corporation, Tacoma, Washington, 16 June 1941; launched 30 December 1941; and delivered to the Army 30 November 1942.

== World War II ==
From December 1942 to April 1943, James O'Hara served as an Army transport, steaming from the West Coast to Australia, thence via the Panama Canal to New York. Arriving New York early in April 1943. she was acquired by the Navy 15 April and commissioned 26 April.

=== Mediterranean Theatre ===
After shakedown, James O'Hara departed Norfolk, Virginia early in June for duty with the 8th Fleet in the Mediterranean. Arriving Oran, Algeria, 22 June, she prepared for the forthcoming invasion of Sicily.

==== Invasion of Sicily ====
Carrying troops of the 45th Infantry Division, she departed 5 July for Operation Husky, and, as part of CENT Force under Rear Admiral A. G. Kirk, she closed the Sicilian shore off Scoglitti 10 July. Despite heavy seas and an enemy air attack, she debarked her troops as Allied forces sought to wrestle the strategic island from Axis control.

During almost the next 2 months James O'Hara shuttled troops from North Africa to Sicily; then she prepared to take part in the Allied invasion of Italy.

==== Invasion of Italy ====
Assigned to Rear Admiral J. L. Hall's Southern Attack Force, she departed Oran 5 September and approached the Gulf of Salerno late 8 September as the Allies announced the armistice with Italy. During mid-watch, 9 September, she debarked assault troops in landing boats, and later began unloading cargo. Her boats assisted HMS Abercrombie, damaged by a German mine. Undaunted by German air attacks, the veteran transport discharged cargo at the Paestrum beaches before departing for Oran 11 September.

As Allied forces secured Salerno, entered Naples, and began the hard-fought drive up the boot of Italy, she continued to transport reinforcements and cargo from North Africa to Italy. On 30 November she departed Oran in convoy for the United Kingdom; and, with almost 2,000 troops embarked, she arrived Belfast, Northern Ireland, 9 December Departing for the United States 20 December, she reached New York 31 December.

=== Pacific Theatre ===
Sailing for Norfolk 15 February 1944, James O'Hara embarked marines and loaded cargo before departing for the Pacific 26 February. She arrived Pearl Harbor 16 March and during the next 2 months practiced for the forthcoming invasion of the Marianas.

==== Invasion of Saipan ====
As part of Vice Admiral R. K. Turner's Northern Attack Force, she departed Pearl Harbor 29 May; touched at Eniwetok; and carrying troops of the 4th Marine Division, arrived off Saipan in the early hours of 15 June. She debarked her troops in the initial assault waves, then discharged cargo as bitter fighting raged on shore. After embarking casualties and enemy prisoners, she departed 17 June and cruised northeast of Saipan while Vice Admiral Marc Mitscher's Fast Carrier Task Force defeated Admiral Ozawa's Mobile Fleet in the Battle of the Philippine Sea, the greatest carrier battle of the war. Following the resounding American victory, James O'Hara returned to Saipan 23 June; completed unloading cargo; and departed 24 June for Eniwetok and Pearl Harbor.

==== Invasion of the Palaus ====
Following additional amphibious training, James O'Hara departed in convoy 12 August and reached Guadalcanal the 24th. On 8 September she sailed for the Palau invasion, aimed at securing air bases prior to the scheduled invasion of the Philippines. She closed the Palaus 15 September, and 2 days later, debarked troops during the amphibious assault against Angaur Island. She remained off the Palaus until 23 September when she sailed for the Admiralties, arriving Manus 27 September.

==== Invasion of Leyte ====
At Manus, James O'Hara embarked troops of the 1st Cavalry Division and departed in convoy 12 October for the invasion of Leyte. Assigned to the Northern Attack Force, she entered Leyte Gulf 20 October, closed about 7 miles off San Ricardo and debarked five waves of assault troops. After unloading 476 tons of combat cargo, she sailed that evening for the Palaus and arrived Kossol Passage the 23rd.

She embarked survivors of escort carriers Gambier Bay and St. Lo, sunk while gallantly defending the Leyte beachhead in the Battle off Samar, and from 28 to 31 October carried them to Guam. After returning to Manus 15 November, between 17 and 29 November she transported reinforcements to Leyte and sailed to Hollandia, New Guinea, to prepare for the invasion of Luzon.

==== Invasion of Luzon ====
As part of Vice Admiral D. E. Barbey's San Fabian Attack Force, James O'Hara departed Sansapor, New Guinea, 30 December with troops of the 6th Infantry Division embarked. Steaming via Leyte Gulf and Surigao and Mindoro Strait, she entered Lingayen Gulf 9 January 1945 and boated assault troops and cargo during amphibious landings which spearheaded the liberation of Luzon. Departing the same day, she steamed via Leyte and Ulithi to Guam where she arrived 6 February to stage for the amphibious invasion of Iwo Jima.

==== Invasion of Iwo Jima ====
Carrying men of the 3rd Marine Division, the attack transport departed Guam 17 February and arrived off Iwo Jima the 19th. Until 27 February she operated in the retirement area; then during the next week she debarked reinforcements, unloaded cargo, and embarked casualties. On 5 March she sailed for Guam where she arrived 8 March to debark more than 400 casualties of the bitter fighting on Iwo Jima.

From 9 to 27 March, James O'Hara sailed via the Solomons and the New Hebrides to New Caledonia where, during the next month, she practiced amphibious attacks. Between 3 May and 15 July she transported men and supplies from New Caledonia and New Guinea to the Philippines. After loading cargo at Guiuan, Samar, she sailed for the United States 18 July and reached San Francisco 4 August.

=== After hostilities ===
After the cessation of hostilities, the veteran transport departed 25 August and carried troops via Eniwetok to the Philippines. Arriving Manila Bay, Luzon, 17 September, she operated along the Luzon coast until 1 October when she departed Lingayen Gulf for Japan. Steaming in convoy, she reached Wakayama, Honshū, 7 October and debarked occupation troops. She departed Nagoya, Honshū, 28 October, embarked returning veterans at Tinian 3 November; and sailed for San Francisco 5 November. After arriving 17 November, between 22 December and 4 February 1946 she made another Operation Magic Carpet run to Saipan and back to the West Coast.

=== Decommission and return to the Army ===
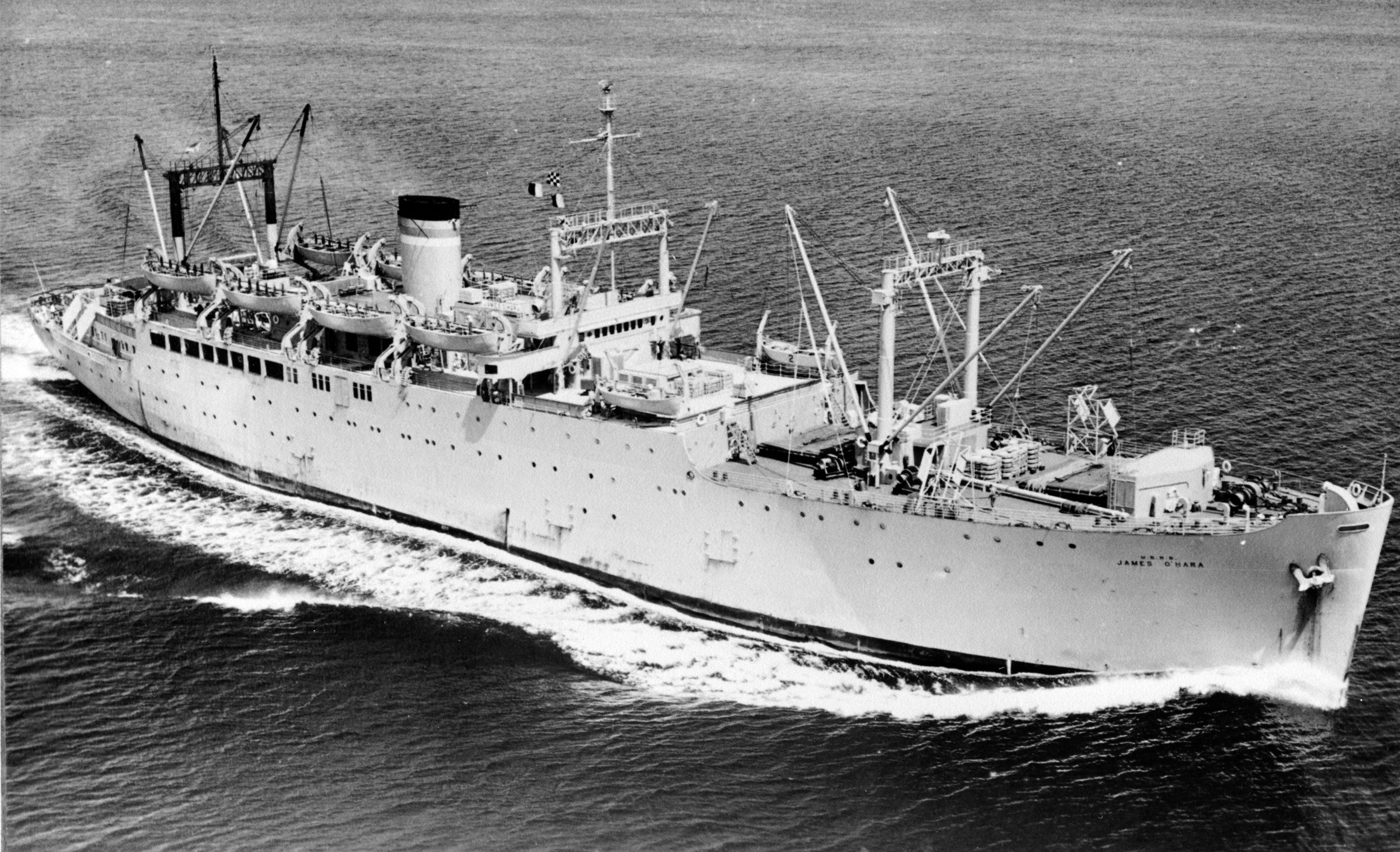
USNS James O'Hara

USS James O'Hara decommissioned at San Francisco 5 April 1946 and was transferred to the Army the same day. During the next 4 years she served out of Seattle, Washington as a transport with the Army Transportation Corps, under the name USNS James O'Hara.

== Korean War ==
Reacquired by the Navy 1 March 1950, she was reclassified T-AP-179 on 28 April and assigned to MSTS.

During the struggle to repulse Communist aggression in South Korea, James O'Hara transported troops and supplies from the West Coast to the Far East. Operating primarily out of Seattle, between October 1950 and July 1954 she made 18 deployments to ports in Japan and South Korea. In addition she supplied American bases in the Marshalls and the Marianas, and she made numerous troop training and rotation runs to bases in Alaska.

=== Final decommission ===
She continued this pattern of deployment and readiness operations until 30 November 1959 when she arrived Seattle for inactivation. She entered the National Defense Reserve Fleet in Puget Sound 14 January 1960. Transferred to the Maritime Administration in November, her name was struck from the Navy List 1 July 1961, and she was berthed at Olympia, Washington.

== Awards ==
James O'Hara received seven battle stars for World War II service and one battle star for Korean War service.
