= USS Briareus =

Cargo ship of the United States Navy

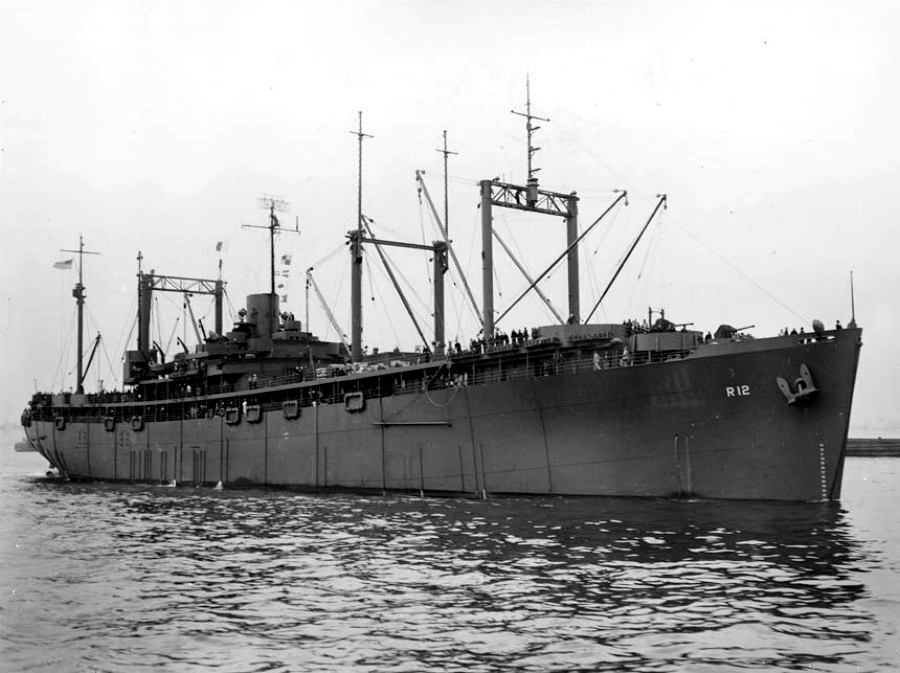
- USS Briareus (AR-12) underway near New York Navy Yard, 16 November 1943, a day after commissioning

History

United States
- Name: SS Hawaiian Planter (1941–16 February 1943); USS Briareus 16 February 1943–9 September 1955); Briareus (9 September 1955–1 January 1977)
- Namesake: Briareus
- Builder: Newport News Shipbuilding & Dry Dock Company
- Launched: 14 February 1941
- Acquired: 16 February 1943
- Commissioned: 15 November 1943
- Decommissioned: 15 October 1946
- Recommissioned: 22 September 1951
- Decommissioned: 9 September 1955
- Stricken: 1 January 1977
- Fate: Sold, delivered for scrapping 14 December 1980

General characteristics
- Class & type: Delta-class repair ship
- Tonnage: 7,798 GRT as SS Hawaiian Planter
- Displacement: 8,975 long tons (9,119 t)
- Length: 468 ft 3 in (142.7 m) as SS Hawaiian Planter; 490 ft 6 in (149.5 m)
- Beam: 69 ft 7 in (21.2 m) as SS Hawaiian Planter; 69 ft 6 in (21.2 m)
- Draft: 29 ft 5 in (9.0 m) as SS Hawaiian Planter; 26 ft 9 in (8.2 m)
- Speed: 18 knots (33 km/h; 21 mph)
- Complement: 903
- Armament: 1 × 5"/38 caliber gun; 1 × 3"/50 caliber gun

USS Briareus was originally the cargo ship SS Hawaiian Planter laid down as a Maritime Commission type C3 Mod. at Newport News, Virginia, by the Newport News Shipbuilding & Dry Dock Company for the Matson Line and delivered 15 May 1941. After a brief pre-war commercial service and allocation to the Army for transport the ship was purchased by the United States Navy in February 1943 and converted to a repair ship.

== Commercial service ==
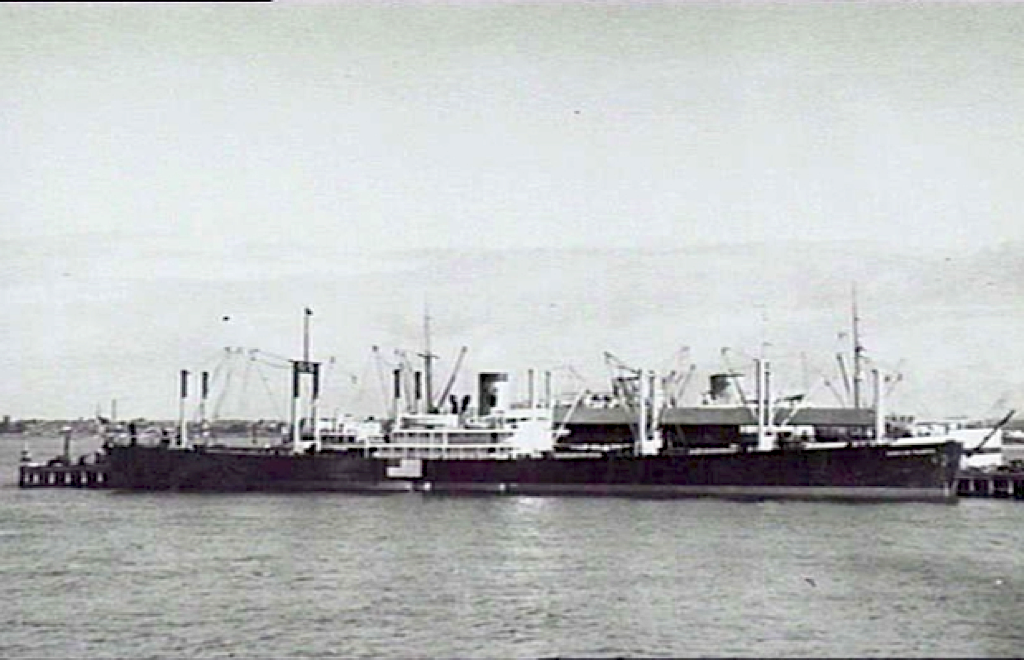
Hawaiian Planter in Port Melbourne, Victoria, 1941

Matson intended the ship to join Hawaiian Shipper and Hawaiian Merchant in the U.S. Pacific coast and Australia route.

On 8 October 1941 the Hawaiian Planter departed the U.S. mainland with a load of drummed aviation fuel under United States Army charter operating in an attempt to build up supplies for bomber missions in the event of war at Singapore and in Australian territory at Rockhampton, Darwin, Port Moresby and Rabaul. On 3 December she departed Honolulu with intent to drop 1,020 drums at Rabaul, 7,140 drums at Port Moresby, 6,000 at Rockhampton and 8,160 at Darwin. The start of war in the Pacific forced a stop in Pago Pago while commanders decided where the cargo should go. The ship was diverted to Sydney with the cargo of fuel six days after the planes and cargoes of the Pensacola Convoy. Those cargoes, along with those of other ships diverted there, were vital in the early buildup of U.S. Army Forces in Australia (USAFIA). On 2 January 1942 Hawaiian Planter departed with cargo for Java in the effort to build forces there.

Until acquisition by the Navy the ship was allocated by the War Shipping Administration for Army shipping requirements. Hawaiian Planter was one of two freighters, the other being Hawaiian Merchant, that with seven troop ships made the first full division movement in one convoy departing San Francisco for Australia 22 April 1942 with the 32nd Infantry Division under escort by the USS Indianapolis (CA-35) reaching Adelaide on 14 May.

== Navy service history ==
Hawaiian Planter was purchased by the Navy on 16 February 1943 and renamed Briareus, then designated a Delta-class repair ship AR-12. She was converted to naval service by the Bethlehem Steel Company at Brooklyn, New York and commissioned on 15 November 1943.

=== World War II, 1943–1946 ===
She conducted her shakedown cruise during the middle of December and then put into Norfolk, Virginia, on the 20th. Briareus remained in Norfolk until 3 January 1944 at which time she put to sea for the Panama Canal. The repair ship arrived in Cristóbal, Canal Zone, on 8 January and transited the canal on the 9th. She continued her voyage west that same day. The ship entered Pearl Harbor on 23 January. There, she began repair work and, over the following month, made repairs on 18 ships. On 25 February, Briareus stood out of Pearl Harbor on her way to the southwestern Pacific. She made port at Espiritu Santo in the New Hebrides on 11 March. There, she relieved Dixie (AD-14) as senior repair ship. During the six months that Briareus spent at Espiritu Santo, she made a variety of repairs on a wide assortment of ships ranging in size from landing craft to the battleship California (BB-44).

Leaving Aristaeus (ARB-1) in charge of the repair work at Espiritu Santo, Briareus left the New Hebrides on 22 September. The ship arrived at Manus in the Admiralty Islands on 26 September and reported for duty to the Commander, Service Squadron (ServRon) 10. At Manus, the repair ship worked preparing damaged ships of all varieties for the upcoming invasion of the Philippines at Leyte. In addition, she made temporary repairs on some more badly damaged ships that had to return to the more extensive repair facilities in the United States. Early in November while Briareus was still at Manus, the ammunition ship Mount Hood (AE-11) exploded in the harbor. Briareus, some seven miles distant at the time, suffered no damage, but three of her crewmen detailed to ammunition delivery, disappeared in the disaster. The repair ship spent much of the remainder of November repairing motor minesweepers (YMS) damaged by fragments in the explosion.

She resumed her normal duties in December 1944 and January 1945 but in February orders sent her to a new location. On 18 February, the ship stood out of Seeadler Harbor and shaped a course for the Solomon Islands. She arrived in at Port Purvis on Florida Island in the Solomons, located across Ironbottom Sound and Sealark Channel from Guadalcanal, on 21 February 1945. At Port Purvis, she concentrated almost entirely upon the repair of tank landing ships (LST). Briareus remained at Purvis Bay only about three weeks. On 15 March, she got underway for the New Hebrides. The repair ship's stay at Espiritu Santo to perform repairs on a force of transports and attack cargo ships proved even briefer than her sojourn in the Solomons. On 1 April, she headed back to Manus in the Admiralty Islands. En route, however, her destination was changed to Ulithi Atoll in the Western Carolines. Briareus arrived in the lagoon at Ulithi later that month and began repairing ships damaged in the Okinawa campaign as well as many damaged by storms off the southern coasts of the Japanese home islands.

The repair ship remained at Ulithi until 3 July when she received orders to, and got underway for, Leyte in the Philippines. She reported for duty to Commander, ServRon 10, at Leyte on 5 July. Originally, she was slated to perform repairs on ships staging for the invasion of Japan, and she spent the rest of July working on transports and amphibious craft, but the imminence of the Japanese capitulation, however, caused a shift of emphasis to the minecraft necessary to sweep in advance of the occupation forces. She also made voyage repairs on ships headed back to the United States. Briareus remained at Leyte until 14 September when she got underway for Okinawa. The repair ship arrived in Buckner Bay on the 18th and resumed repair duty. The Okinawa assignment lasted until December when she headed back to the United States. By early 1946, the ship was in Norfolk, Virginia, assigned to the Service Force, Atlantic Fleet. On 20 May 1946, Briareus reported to the Commander, Norfolk Group, 16th (Atlantic Reserve) Fleet, to begin inactivation. Decommissioned on 15 October 1946, she was berthed at Norfolk.

=== Atlantic Fleet, 1951–1955 ===
Briareus was brought out of reserve and was recommissioned at Norfolk on 22 September 1951 with Captain W. J. O'Brien . The ship conducted sea trials out of Norfolk on 23 October. Returning to port that same day, she remained at Norfolk until 13 November when she got underway for Boston, Massachusetts. Briareus arrived at her destination on 15 November and entered the Boston Naval Shipyard for two months of repairs. On 24 January 1952, the repair ship headed back to Norfolk where she began an assignment of just over three years with the Service Force, Atlantic Fleet. In addition to her repair work in Norfolk, she pursued the routine of periodic fleet and single-ship exercises in the Virginia Capes operating area. She also served briefly at such ports as Charleston in South Carolina and Port Everglades and Mayport in Florida.

=== In reserve and disposal, 1955–1980 ===
On 26 May 1955, Briareus entered the Norfolk Naval Shipyard for an overhaul. On 9 September 1955, she was decommissioned and berthed once more with the Norfolk Group, Atlantic Reserve Fleet, which she served as an accommodation and depot ship. That occupation continued until 7 June 1972 at which time she was transferred to the Maritime Administration for lay up in its James River Group, National Defense Reserve Fleet. She was surveyed late in 1976, and her name was struck from the Navy List on 1 January 1977. On 3 May 1978 the ship was withdrawn by the Navy from the James River reserve fleet to the Norfolk Naval Shipyard for stripping. On 19 November 1980 the stripped vessel was sold to the Jacobson Metal Company in Chesapeake, Virginia, for $411,601 for scrapping and delivered to the buyer on 14 December 1980.

== References cited ==
- This article incorporates text from the public domain Dictionary of American Naval Fighting Ships. The entry can be found here.
- "Briareus". history.navy.mil. Archived from the original on 24 July 2006.
- Cairns Post (1941). "Five Ships – America to Australia". Cairns Post. No. 10 July 1941.
- Colton, T. (12 April 2008). "C3 Cargo Ships". ShipBuildingHistory. Archived from the original on 22 June 2009.
- Grover, David (1987). U.S. Army Ships and Watercraft of World War II. Naval Institute Press. ISBN 0-87021-766-6. LCCN 87-15514.
- Lloyds (1943–44). "Lloyd's Register" (PDF). Lloyd's Register (through PlimsollShipData).
- Maritime Administration. "BRIAREUS (AR-12)". Ship History Database Vessel Status Card. U.S. Department of Transportation, Maritime Administration.
- Williford, Glen M. (2010). Racing the Sunrise – Reinforcing America's Pacific Outposts 1941–1942. Annapolis, Maryland: Naval Institute Press. ISBN 978-1-59114-956-9. LCCN 2010030455.
- "The 32D Infantry Division in World War II". 32D 'Red Arrow' Veteran Association. Archived from the original on 22 October 2008.
