= USS Sitka (APA-113) =

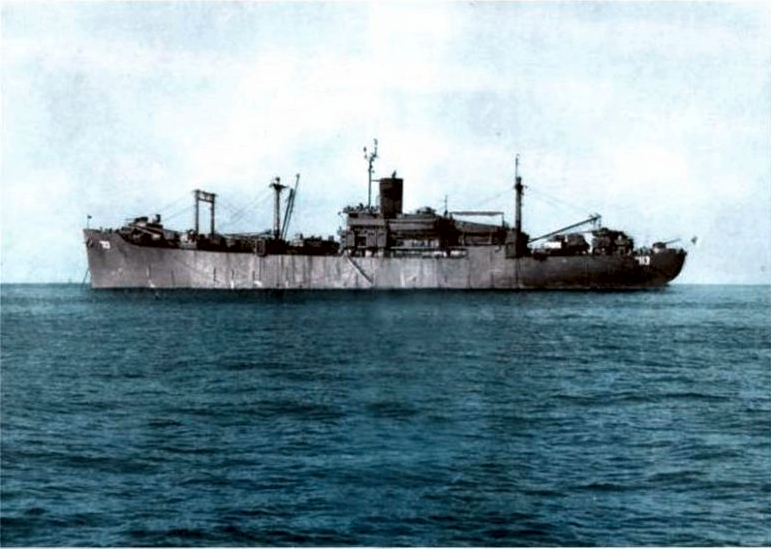

History

United States
- Name: Sitka
- Namesake: Sitka, Alaska
- Builder: Ingalls Shipbuilding, Pascagoula, Mississippi
- Laid down: 2 February 1944
- Launched: 23 June 1944
- Commissioned: 14 March 1945
- Decommissioned: 14 May 1946
- Stricken: 5 June 1946
- Fate: Sold into merchant service, 1947; Scrapped, 1976

General characteristics
- Class & type: Bayfield-class attack transport
- Displacement: 8,100 long tons (8,230 t) light; 16,100 long tons (16,358 t) full
- Length: 492 ft 6 in (150.11 m)
- Beam: 69 ft 6 in (21.18 m)
- Draft: 26 ft 6 in (8.08 m)
- Propulsion: General Electric geared turbine, 2 combustion engineering "D"-type boilers, single propeller
- Speed: 18 knots (33 km/h; 21 mph)
- Boats & landing craft carried: 12 × LCVPs; 4 × LCMs (Mk-6); 3 × LCPLs (Mk-IV)
- Capacity: 200,000 cubic feet, 4,700 tons cargo
- Troops: 80 officers, 1,146 enlisted men; Flag Accommodation: 43 officers, 108 enlisted men
- Complement: 51 officers, 524 enlisted men
- Armament: 2 × single 5"/38 caliber guns (fore and aft); 2 × single 40 mm AA guns; 2 × twin 40 mm AA guns; 18 × single 20 mm AA guns

USS Sitka (APA-113) was a Bayfield-class attack transport in service with the United States Navy from 1945 to 1946. She was sold into commercial service in 1947 and was scrapped in 1976.

== History ==
Sitka was named for Sitka, Alaska, a town on the western coast of Baranof Island. The name was originally assigned to PF-94 on 30 August 1943, but she was renamed Milledgeville (PF-94) on 7 February 1944. Sitka (APA-113) was laid down on 2 February 1944 under Maritime Commission contract (MC hull 875, Type C3-S-A2) by the Ingalls Shipbuilding Corporation of Pascagoula, Mississippi; launched on 23 June 1944; sponsored by Mrs. Mary Lee Council; and commissioned on 14 March 1945.

=== 1945–1946 ===
Sitka departed Mobile, Alabama on 20 March 1945; and, after stopping at New Orleans for supplies, arrived at Bolivar Roads, Galveston on 28 March 1945 for shakedown. However, her shakedown lasted only four days, as she received orders to report to Newport, Rhode Island for duty as training ship for pre-commissioning crews being-formed there. Sitka arrived at Newport on 6 April and, for two and one-half months, she trained crews of new amphibious and auxiliary vessels in seamanship and gunnery. Relieved by the Guilford (APA-112), Sitka sailed from Newport for Norfolk, Virginia, on 25 June.

After a brief overhaul, Sitka sailed from Norfolk on 6 July with a replacement draft of several hundred marines, as well as other troops and cargo. Transiting the Panama Canal on 11 July, Sitka called at Pearl Harbor from 24 July to 3 August and at Eniwetok on the 11th and 12th, before arriving at Guam on the 15th. She discharged her troops and cargo at Guam, and sailed for Manila on 27 August to embark troops for the occupation of Japan. Departing Manila on 7 September, the transport arrived at Yokohama, Japan on the 13th and began disembarking troops and equipment two days later.

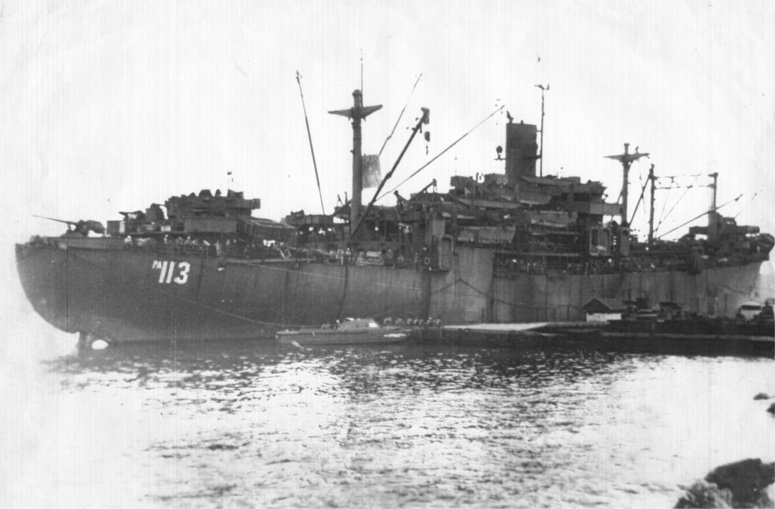
USS Sitka (APA-113) moored pierside, date and place unknown.

Sitka departed Yokohama on the 19th; and, between 23 and 27 September, embarked units of the 6th Marine Division at Guam for the occupation of Qingdao, China. She arrived at Qingdao on 11 October and disembarked her troops and cargo on the 15th and 16th. After returning to Manila on the 23rd for a week of upkeep, she embarked units of the 52nd Chinese National Army at Hai Phong, Indochina on 3 November; and disembarked them at Chinwangtao in northern China on the 13th. After a week at Taku, she departed China on the 21st and arrived at Manila on the 26th to join "Operation Magic Carpet," the transportation of war veterans home to the United States. Sitka sailed from Manila on 28 November carrying homeward-bound servicemen and arrived at Seattle, Washington on 14 December.

Sitka remained at Seattle for repairs until sailing to Saipan and Guam on 30 January 1946. The ship arrived at San Pedro on 23 February and got underway for the east coast on 1 March. On 16 March she arrived at Norfolk for deactivation.

=== In mercantile service, 1946–1976 ===
Sitka was decommissioned on 14 May 1946, returned to the War Shipping Administration the next day, and struck from the Naval Vessel Register on 5 June 1946. She was sold into mercantile service to Pope & Talbot Lines in 1947 and renamed SS P&T Trader; resold in 1957 to Moore-McCormack Lines, Inc., and renamed SS Mormacguide; and resold in 1964 to the American Foreign Steamship Corporation and renamed SS American Condor in 1964. The ship was scrapped in 1976.
