= USS Samaritan =

American hospital ship

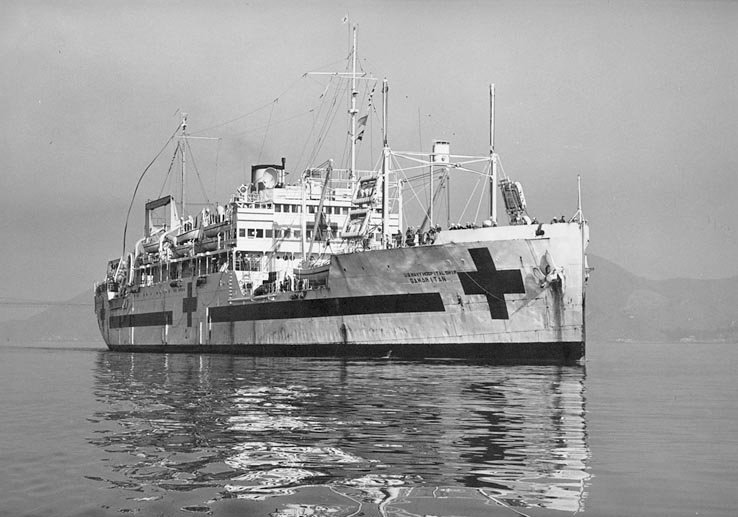
- USS Samaritan (AH-10) in San Francisco Bay, late 1945 or early 1946

History

United States
- Name: USAT Chaumont; USS Chaumont; USS Samaritan (AH-10)
- Namesake: In honor of the American Expeditionary Force's headquarters at Chaumont, France in World War I; Samaritan (Note: The name Samaritan probably refers to the Good Samaritan of the Bible.)
- Builder: American International Shipbuilding
- Laid down: 11 November 1918 as Shope
- Launched: 31 March 1920
- Completed: September 1920
- Acquired: 3 November 1921
- Commissioned: 22 November 1921
- Decommissioned: 25 June 1946
- Renamed: USS Chaumont (AP-5), USS Samaritan (AH-10)
- Reclassified: AP-5 to AH-10, 2 September 1943
- Identification: USSB hull no. 671
- Honors and awards: Four battle stars for World War II service
- Fate: Sold for scrap, 1948

General characteristics
- Type: Design 1024 ship
- Displacement: 8,300 tons (lt) 13,400 t. (fl)
- Length: 448 ft (137 m)
- Beam: 58 ft 3 in (17.75 m)
- Draft: 26 ft 5 in (8.05 m)
- Propulsion: Geared turbine, single screw, 6,000 horsepower
- Speed: 14 knots
- Capacity: (AH) patients: 394
- Complement: 286
- Armament: Unknown

USS Samaritan (AH-10) was a hospital ship that served with the US Navy in World War II. Prior to that, she served as a US Navy transport ship under the name USS Chaumont (AP-5).

USS Chaumont, one of twelve 13,400-ton (displacement) Hog Island Type B (Design 1024) transports laid down in November 1918 as SS Shope for the U.S. Shipping Board, launched in March 1920 at Hog Island, Pennsylvania by the American International Shipbuilding Corporation. In November 1920 the ship was delivered to the Shipping Board and transferred to the War Department on 15 December 1920 with assignment to the U.S. Army Transport Service. Redundant to Army needs, she was transferred "on loan" to the Navy on 3 November 1921 and commissioned on the 22nd, Lieutenant Commander G. H. Emmerson in temporary command. On 1 December 1921, Commander C.L. Arnold assumed command. Permanent transfer to the Navy by Executive order was effective 6 August 1924.

== Peacetime service ==
Assigned to transport duty, Chaumont sailed the Atlantic, Pacific, and Caribbean throughout the 1920s and 1930s. From her home port at San Francisco, she commenced a career of trans-Pacific troop service that initially consisted of voyages between California and Manila via Honolulu. Two or three voyages in 1925-26 took her to Shanghai instead of Manila, and she continued to stop at Shanghai at least once during most subsequent years. One of her most important contributions, when in the Pacific, was aiding in the collection of meteorological information used by the Weather Map Service of the Asiatic Fleet. She also carried military supplies, Marine expeditionary forces, sailors and their dependents, and occasionally members of congressional committees on inspection tours, calling at ports from Shanghai to Bermuda.

In August 1926 she sailed from San Francisco through the Panama Canal to Annapolis. The return trip took her to Norfolk, Virginia, where she was drydocked for routine maintenance, and then to Guantanamo Bay. Such voyages between the East and West Coasts also became near-annual events.

=== Missions to Shanghai ===
Chaumont's voyages to Shanghai provided important assistance to U.S. Far Eastern diplomacy during the 1920s and 1930s by supporting the Marine Corps units deployed to the International Settlement in that city to protect U.S. nationals there. At the end of January 1932 Japanese forces in the Settlement attacked nearby Chinese forces, leading to intensive fighting in the city.

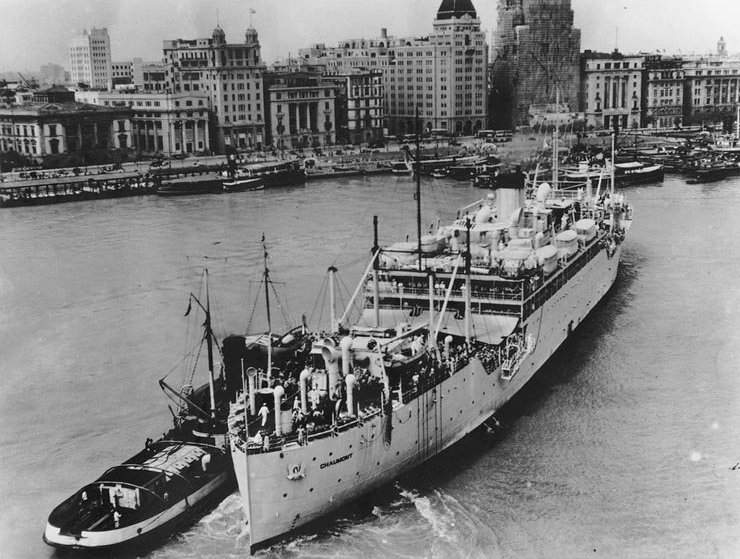
USS Chaumont with the 6th Marine Regiment, Shanghai, China 1937

Chaumont was in Manila at the time, and on 31 January the Navy Department ordered her to embark the 1,000 men of the Army's 31st Infantry Regiment and sail for Shanghai. Responding rapidly, Chaumont cleared Manila with the troops on board on 2 February and arrived at Shanghai on the 5th.

Five years later, in mid-September 1937, Chaumont rushed the 6th Marine Regiment to Shanghai to reinforce the 4th Regiment that was protecting the Settlement during the all-out Japanese effort to seize the city from tenacious Chinese defenders. Chaumont suffered two mishaps during her China service in 1936–37, a week-long period aground at Qinhuangdao and a collision at Shanghai with the Italian cruiser Raimondo Montecuccoli.

== World War II ==
When the Japanese attacked Pearl Harbor in December 1941, Chaumont was on one of her regular voyages from Hawaii to Manila, carrying sailors, civilian workmen, and cargo that included munitions. She was diverted as part of the "Pensacola Convoy" to Brisbane then, after a period of reloading the convoy's men and cargo, she proceeded to Darwin, Australia with Navy supplies where she discharged her passengers and cargo on 5 January 1942. After returning to Brisbane she went to Sydney then Wellington, New Zealand and Balboa before returning to San Francisco on 29 March 1942. After two runs to Pearl Harbor, the now elderly transport was assigned to service between Seattle and Alaska, bringing men and supplies to assist in the defense of the Aleutians. Selected in March 1943 for conversion to a hospital ship, Chaumont was decommissioned in August for conversion at Seattle.

Renamed Samaritan (AH-10), she was recommissioned in March 1944. Between 25 March and 11 May, she made two voyages from San Francisco to Hawaii, with passengers outward bound and patients homeward bound. Arriving in Honolulu a third time 11 May, she continued to Kwajalein, where from 17 June to 1 July, she treated casualties from the Saipan invasion. On 8 July she arrived off Saipan itself to embark patients for evacuation to Noumea, New Caledonia, from which she returned to Saipan 1 August for two weeks of duty as a receiving hospital.

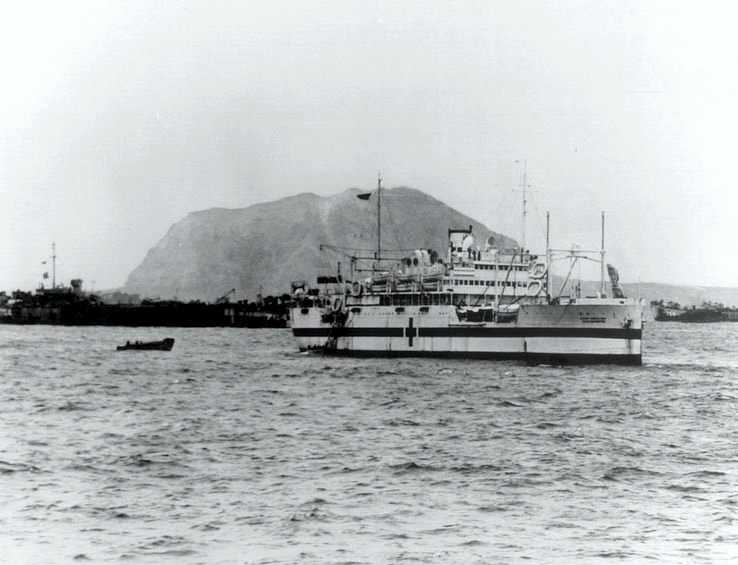
Off Iwo Jima, February 1945

Samaritan evacuated patients from Guam to Guadalcanal, and from Peleliu to the Russell Islands in August and September 1944. After a brief overhaul at Espiritu Santo, she served as base hospital at Ulithi until 16 February 1945, when she sailed for Iwo Jima. She arrived off the bitterly engaged island 20 February, and sailed 2 days later with 606 patients on board for Saipan. On the second day out, eight men were buried at sea. The hospital ship returned to Iwo Jima 25 February 1945 to embark patients for transportation to Guam on the first of two such voyages. She arrived at Ulithi 2 April, and a week later got underway for embattled Okinawa. Arriving 13 April, she received casualties at the beach during the daytime and withdrew at night to the transport areas offshore, alternating her stays at Okinawa with evacuation voyages to Saipan until 1 July, when she sailed from Saipan for Pearl Harbor. Here she took patients from several island hospitals on board, sailed to San Francisco, and on 10 September back to Pearl Harbor thence Sasebo, where she provided hospital facilities to occupation forces until 15 March 1946.

== Decommissioning ==
She returned to San Francisco 23 April, and was decommissioned there 25 June 1946. On 29 August 1946 she was transferred to the Maritime Commission for disposal, and was delivered to a scrapping firm in January 1948.

== Awards ==
Samaritan received four battle stars for World War II service.

== Media ==
USS Chaumont features in the WEB Griffin series of novels, "The Corps".

== Bibliography ==
- Clay, Steven E. (2011). U. S. Army Order Of Battle 1919-1941 (PDF). Volume 4. The Services: Quartermaster, Medical, Military Police, Signal Corps, Chemical Warfare, And Miscellaneous Organizations, 1919-41. Fort Leavenworth, KS: Combat Studies Institute Press. ISBN 9780984190140. LCCN 2010022326. Archived from the original (PDF) on 16 September 2012.
- Naval History And Heritage Command. "Chaumont". Dictionary of American Naval Fighting Ships. Naval History And Heritage Command.
- Dictionary of American Naval Fighting Ships Samaritan Refers reader to Chaumont
- Photo gallery of USS Samaritan at NavSource Naval History
- Masterson, Dr. James R. (1949). U. S. Army Transportation In The Southwest Pacific Area 1941-1947. Washington, D. C.: Transportation Unit, Historical Division, Special Staff, U. S. Army.
- Mayo, Lida (1968). The Technical Services—The Ordnance Department: On Beachhead And Battlefront. United States Army In World War II. Washington, DC: Center Of Military History, United States Army. LCCN 79014631.
- Morton, Lewis (1993). The War in the Pacific: The Fall Of The Philippines. United States Army In World War II. Washington, D.C.: Center Of Military History, United States Army. LCCN 53-63678. Archived from the original on 21 September 2012.
- "Chaumont". history.navy.mil.
- This article incorporates text from the public domain Dictionary of American Naval Fighting Ships. The entry can be found here.
