= American Foreign Steamship Corporation =

Former US shipping company

- Industry: Transportation and shipping
- Founded: 1932 in New York City, New York
- Key people: Ira L. Rosenson; Sophia Pruss; Elias Katz; Morris Ginsberg

American Foreign Steamship Corporation was founded in Brooklyn, New York City, in 1932 by Ira L. Rosenson, Sophia Pruss and Elias Katz. Rosenson was an attorney and the major shareholder in the firm. American Foreign Steamship Corporation purchased a 5,570-ton cargo ship SS Eastern Glen from the American South African Line in 1933. American Foreign Steamship Corporation named the ship the SS American Oriole. The ship was built by Kabushiki Kaisha Uchida Zosengo company of Yokohama, Japan, in 1920. The ship was a United States Shipping Board ship. The next two ships purchased was the SS Liberty Glo and SS Wildwood, these were Hog Islanders type ships. The two ships were purchased from the South Atlantic Steamship Company. In 1938 another Hog Islanders ship was purchased the, SS Magmeric, renamed the SS American Robin. The American Oriole was sold to England in 1940 to help with the World War II efforts. She was renamed the SS Barberrys, but on November 26, 1942, she was sunk by a torpedoed from German submarine U-663 off of St. John's, Newfoundland.

== World War II ==
American Foreign Steamship Corporation fleet of ships were used to help the World War II effort. During World War II American Foreign Steamship Corporation operated merchant navy ships for the United States Shipping Board. During World War II American Foreign Steamship Corporation was active with charter shipping with the Maritime Commission and War Shipping Administration. American Foreign Steamship Corporation operated Liberty ships and Victory ships for the merchant navy. The ship was run by its American Foreign Steamship Corporation crew and the US Navy supplied United States Navy Armed Guards to man the deck guns and radio.

== Ships ==
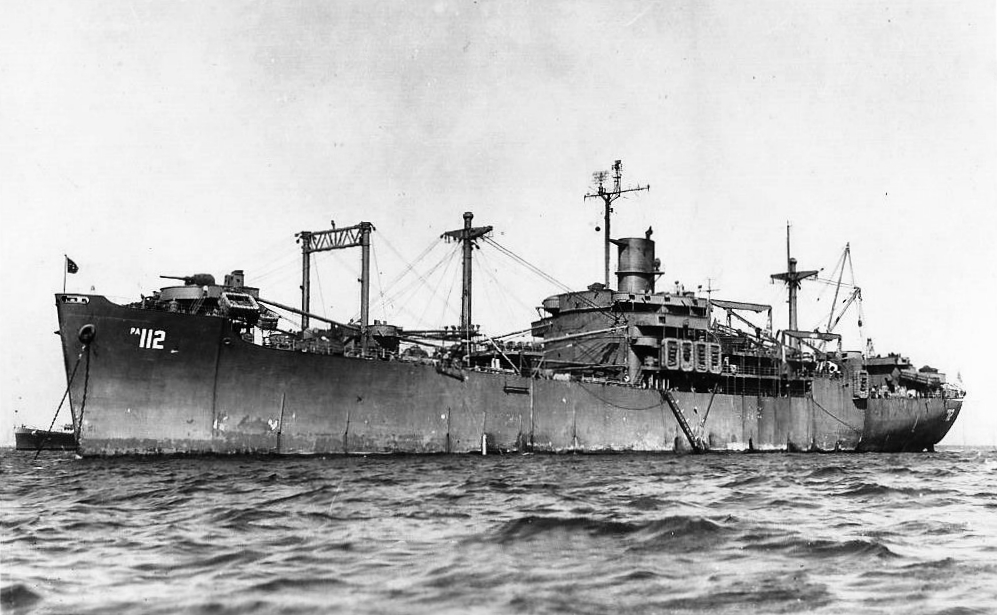
American Foreign Steamship Corporation's ship SS American Oriole, a type C3-S-A2 ship

Ships owned:

- SS American Starling, was Liberty ship SS William Libbey, acquired in 1947 sold in 1957.
- American Eagle was Edward L. Logan a Liberty ship tanker built in 1959, 280,455 barrels of oil, acquired in 1947 sold in 1957.
- SS American Robin, Liberty ship built in 1947, acquired in 1950, was SS Robert Watchorn
- SS American Hawk, acquired in 1976 was Type T2 tanker, named Tamppico
- SS American Falcon, acquired 1963, scrapped in 1973, built in 1944, a type C3-S-A2.
- Esso Reading, (1946–1961), a T2-SE-A1 tanker built in 1944 by Sun Shipbuilding & Drydock Co.
- SS American Condor, was the SS Mormacguide built in 1945, a type C3-S-A2, acquired in 1964, scrapped in 1976.
- SS American Oriole
- SS Liberty Glo

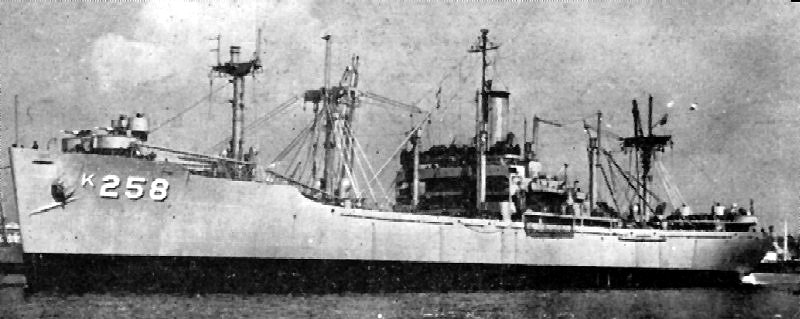
A Victory ship of World War II

Liberty ship of World War II

  - World War II:
  - Liberty ships:
- SS James Eagan Layne
- SS John Catron
- Nathan Clifford
- Morris Sheppard
- John Catron
- John Lind
- James Roy Wells
- Cleveland Forbes
- Henry H. Sibley
- SS Charles C. Randleman on August 31, 1945, ran ashore and wrecked on Apo Reef, Philippine Islands.
- SS Ralph Izard
- Thomas Nuttall
- SS Abigail Gibbons
  - Victory ships:
- High Point Victory
- Stamford Victory
  - Korean War, ship operated:
- Hibbing Victory

== See also ==
- World War II United States Merchant Navy
