= SS Liberty Glo =

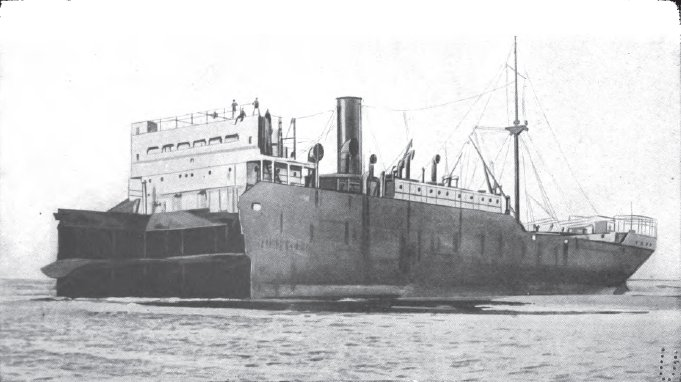
- The aft part of SS Liberty Glo, still afloat after her collision with a mine in December 1919.

History
- Name: Liberty Glo
- Owner: 1919: U.S. Shipping Board; 1928: South Atlantic SSC; 1936: American Foreign SSC; 1947: North Star Co.
- Builder: American International Shipbuilding Co.
- Yard number: 517
- Launched: 14 June 1919
- Christened: Scooba
- Completed: August 1919
- Renamed: Liberty Glo 1919; North Glow 1947
- Fate: Scrapped at Baltimore, 1950

General characteristics
- Type: Design 1022 cargo ship
- Tonnage: 7,500 dwt
- Length: 390 ft (120 m)
- Beam: 54 ft (16 m)
- Draft: 27 ft 5 in (8.36 m)
- Installed power: Oil-fired steam turbines
- Propulsion: Single screw

SS Liberty Glo (originally Scooba) was built by American International Shipbuilding at Hog Island in Philadelphia during World War I, but was not completed until after the November 1918 armistice. While off the Dutch coast in December 1919, it struck a mine which broke her in two, but the aft part of the vessel remained afloat and was repaired. She served as a civilian cargo ship during World War II and was scrapped in 1950 in Baltimore.

== Early career ==
Hog Island Hull No. 517 was laid down as SS Scooba on June 12, 1918 but by the time it was launched on June 14, 1919 it had been renamed SS Liberty Glo. Delivered to the U.S. Shipping Board on August 2, 1919, she was a cargo ship of 5,000 GT and 7,825 long tons deadweight (DWT), 394 feet (120 m) long and 54 feet (16 m) beam. Liberty Glo was the 36th Hog Islander built and one of twelve built as "Type B" troop carriers. (Liberty Glo was not a Liberty Ship, which were a similar concept of vessel built during World War II.)

On December 5, 1919, the Liberty Glo struck a mine 10 mi (19 km) northwest of Terschelling on the coast of the Netherlands. The explosion broke the hull in two from waterline to waterline at number two cargo hold, the deck plates and bulwarks holding the ship together so that, despite the heavy sea running, the captain was able to get it ashore with no casualties and save most of the US$2,000,000 cargo. Captain Stousland paid the following tribute to the Hog Island product:

She broke close to the rivets but they remained intact, notwithstanding the fact that the number three bulkhead is now the bows and against it the breakers hammered without mercy to my great surprise it remained intact. The Liberty Glo was built as good as any ship afloat and how she hung together after being cut in two was most remarkable.

== Later career ==
On 28 February 1929, Liberty Glo ran aground off Terneuzen, Zeeland, the Netherlands. She was refloated on 2 March 1929.

By 1939, Liberty Glo was one of four ships sailing for the American Foreign Steamship Corporation of New York. During World War II, the ship sailed in several Atlantic convoys to the Mediterranean. The ship was renamed North Glow in 1947, but only sailed for three more years. In November 1950, the ship was broken up in Baltimore.
