= Cardington =

Cardington may refer to:

- Cardington, Bedfordshire, a village and civil parish in England
  - Cardington Airfield, the nearby air base that has two vast airship hangars
- Cardington, Shropshire, a village and civil parish in England
- Cardington, Ohio, a village in the United States
- SS Cardington, a Hog Islander laid down in 1917, launched as SS Jolee
