= SS Jolee =

Cargo ship

History
- Name: Cardington (1920); Jolee (1920–41); Empire Flamingo (1941–44)
- Owner: United States Shipping Board (1920–33); Lykes Brothers-Ripley Steamship Co Inc (1933–41); Ministry of War Transport (1941–44)
- Operator: United States Shipping Board (1920–33); Lykes Brothers-Ripley Steamship Co Inc (1933–41); G Nisbet & Co. Ltd. (1941–44))
- Port of registry: Philadelphia, Pennsylvania, United States (1920–33); Houston, Texas, United States (1933–41); London United Kingdom (1941–44)
- Builder: American International Shipbuilding
- Yard number: 1525
- Launched: 20 April 1920
- In service: 27 July 1920
- Out of service: 9 June 1944
- Identification: United States Official Number 140185 (1920–41); United Kingdom Official Number 168084 (1941–44)); Code Letters LWHQ (1920–34); Code Letters KUVT (1934-41); Code Letters BCFG (1941–44)
- Fate: Sunk as a blockship

General characteristics
- Type: Cargo ship
- Tonnage: 4,994 GRT (1920–41), 5,519 GRT (1941–44); 3,033 NRT (1920–41), 3,280 NRT (1941–44); 5,500 DWT
- Length: 390 ft 0 in (118.87 m)
- Beam: 54 ft 2 in (16.51 m)
- Depth: 27 ft 8 in (8.43 m)
- Propulsion: Steam turbine, single screw propeller
- Speed: 11.5 knots (21.3 km/h)

Jolee was a 5,500-gross register ton (GRT) Design 1022 cargo ship that was built in 1920 by American International Shipbuilding, Hog Island, Philadelphia, Pennsylvania, United States for the United States Shipping Board (USSB). Launched as Cardington, She was completed as Jolee. She was sold in 1933 to Lykes Brothers - Ripley Steamship Co Inc. She was purchased by the Ministry of War Transport (MoWT) in 1941 and renamed Empire Flamingo. She served until June 1944 when she was sunk as a blockship at Juno Beach.

== Description ==
The ship was a Design 1022 cargo ship built in 1920 by American International Shipbuilding, Hog Island, Philadelphia, Pennsylvania, United States. She was yard number 1920.

The ship was 390 ft 0 in (118.87 m) long, with a beam of 54 feet 2 inches (16.51 m). She had a depth of 27 feet 8 inches (8.43 m). She was assessed at 4,994 GRT, 3,033 NRT, 5,500 DWT.

The ship was propelled by a steam turbine, double reduction geared, driving a single screw propeller. The turbine was made by General Electric Co Inc, Schenectady, New York. It could propel her at 11.5 knots (21.3 km/h).

== History ==
The ship was built by American International Shipbuilding, Hog Island, Philadelphia, Pennsylvania, United States in 1920 for the USSB. She was launched as Cardington and was completed as Jolee. The Code Letters LWHQ and United States Official Number 140185 were allocated. Her port of registry was Philadelphia.

In 1933, Jolee was sold to the Lykes Brothers - Ripley Steamship Co Inc. Her port of registry was changed to Houston, Texas. In 1934, she was assigned the Code Letters KUVT.

In 1941, Jolee was sold to the MoWT. she sailed from New Orleans, Louisiana, United States on 4 January 1941 for Tampa, Florida, where she arrived on 6 January. She departed two days later for Halifax, Nova Scotia, Canada, arriving on 17 January. Jolee departed on 3 February with Convoy HX 107, which arrived at Liverpool, Lancashire on 28 February. She was carrying a cargo of phosphates. Jolee was renamed Empire Flamingo. Her port of registry was London. She was allocated the United Kingdom Official Number 168084 and the Code Letters BCFG. She was assessed as 5,519 GRT, 3,280 NRT). Empire Flamingo was operated under the management of G Nisbet & Co. Ltd.

Jolee sailed from the Clyde on 8 April to join Convoy OB 307, which had sailed from Liverpool the previous day and dispersed at sea on 13 April. She was bound for Baltimore, Maryland, where she arrived on 28 April. She sailed on 9 May for Halifax, arriving on 14 May, sailing two days later with Convoy HX 127. The convoy arrived at Liverpool on 2 June. Jolee was carrying a cargo of scrap steel. She left the convoy and put into Oban, Argyllshire, where she arrived on 31 May. She sailed on 2 June to join Convoy WN 135, which had departed from the Clyde the previous day and arrived at Methil, Fife on 5 June.

Jolee was renamed Empire Flamingo. She sailed from Methil on 21 June and reached Loch Ewe on 25 June via Convoy EC 35 and Convoy EC 36. She then joined Convoy OB 339, which departed from Liverpool on 26 June and arrived at Halifax on 12 July. She left the convoy at Saint John, New Brunswick, Canada, on 10 July and sailed the next day for Tampa, where she arrived on 24 July. She sailed on 6 August for Boca Grande, Florida, arriving later that day. Empire Flamingo departed from Boca Grande on 9 August for Halifax, arriving on 16 August. She sailed on 21 August with Convoy HX 146, which arrived at Liverpool on 6 September. She was carrying a cargo of phosphates. She left the convoy at Loch Ewe on 5 September and joined Convoy WN 177, which departed from Oban that day and arrived at Methil on 8 September. She then joined Convoy FS 591, which sailed on 10 September and arrived at Southend, Essex two days later.

Empire Flamingo departed from Southend on 26 September with Convoy EC 78, which arrived at the Clyde on 1 October. Although noted in official records as having returned, she arrived at Loch Ewe on 30 September. She then sailed to New York, United States, arriving on 19 October. Empire Flamingo sailed on 14 November for Halifax, arriving two days later.

Following a long period under repair and carrying a cargo of pig iron, Empire Flamingo sailed from Halifax on 24 May 1942 with Convoy HX 191, which arrived at Liverpool on 6 June. She returned to Halifax. She sailed on 31 May with Convoy HX 192, which arrived at Liverpool on 11 June. She left the convoy at the Clyde on 11 June.

Empire Flamingo sailed on 6 August to join Convoy ON 119, which had departed from Liverpool the previous day and arrived at New York on 20 August. She put back with engine defects, arriving at the Clyde on 7 August. She departed on 16 August to join Convoy ON 122, which had departed from Liverpool the previous day and dispersed at sea on 3 September. Empire Flamingo again returned to the Clyde, arriving on 22 August. She sailed on 8 November as a member of Convoy KMS 3G, which arrived at Bône, Algeria on 26 November. She left the convoy at Algiers, where she arrived on 25 November. Empire Flamingo sailed on 6 December to join Convoy MKS 3X, which had departed from Bône on 3 December and arrived at Liverpool on 19 December. She left the convoy at the Belfast Lough on 18 December and joined Convoy BB 246, which ailed that day and arrived at Milford Haven, Pembrokeshire on 19 December. She sailed on to Swansea, Glamorgan, arriving on 20 December.

Empire Flamingo sailed on 5 January 1943 for Barrow-in-Furness, Lancashire, arriving on 7 January. She departed on 18 January for the Clyde, where she arrived the next day. She departed on 26 February with Convoy KMS 10G, which arrived at Bône on 11 March. On 6 March the Fort ship Fort Battle River was torpedoed and sunk by U-410 west of Gibraltar. Sixty-five people were rescued by HMCS Shediac and Empire Flamingo. She left the convoy at Gibraltar on 7 March and subsequently sailed to Algiers. She sailed on 12 April to join Convoy MKS 11, which had departed from Bône on 10 April and arrived at Liverpool on 23 April. She left the convoy at the Belfast Lough on 24 April and joined Convoy BB 284, which sailed that day and arrived at Milford Haven on 25 April. She sailed on to Cardiff, Glamorgan, arriving the next day.

Empire Flamingo sailed on 4 May for Penarth, Gamorgan, arriving later that day. She sailed on 17 May for Milford Haven, where she arrived on 18 May. She sailed the next day to join Convoy KX 10, which sailed that day from Liverpool and arrived at Gibraltar on 31 May. She sailed on 8 June with Convoy GTX 2, which arrived at Alexandria, Egypt on 19 June. She left the convoy at Bône on 11 June. Empire Flamingo sailed on 2 July to join Convoy MKS 16A, which had departed from Tripoli, Libya on 29 June and arrived at Gibraltar on 6 July. She sailed on 12 July to join Convoy OS 51, which formed at sea on 13 July and arrived at Freetown, Sierra Leone on 23 July. She departed on 18 August as a member of Concoy ST 74. She arrived at Lagos, Nigeria on 25 August. Empire Flamingo sailed two days later for Forcados, Nigeria, arriving on 28 August. She departed on 12 September, arriving back at Lagos two days later. She sailed on 16 October for Takoradi, Gold Coast, where she arrived on 18 October. Empire Flamingo departed on 5 November to join Convoy LTS 4, which had sailed from Lagos on 3 November and arrived at Freetown on 10 November. Carrying a cargo of West African produce, she departed on 23 November as a member of Convoy SL 141, which rendezvoused at sea with Convoy MKS 32 on 4 December. The combined convoys arrived at Liverpool on 17 December.

Empire Flamingo departed from Liverpool on 16 April 1944 for Oban, Argyllshire, arriving the next day. She later sailed to Poole, Dorset, from where she sailed on 6 June as part of CORNCOB 1, which arrived in the Seine Bay the next day. On 9 June, she was sunk as part of Gooseberry 4 at Juno Beach, Arromanches, Calvados, France. Her bow section was salvaged in 1948 and taken in tow, intended for scrapping at Newport, Monmouthshire but it sank on 26 October 3 nautical miles (5.6 km) south of the Longships Lighthouse, in the Atlantic Ocean off the coast of Cornwall. Four people were rescued by the Sennen Lifeboat. Empire Flamingo was being towed by the tug Superman and foundered when a temporary bulkhead failed. The bow section was raised again in 1949 and re-sunk off Gwennap Head, Cornwall.
