= SS Abigail Gibbons =

WWII Liberty Ship

History

United States
- Name: Abigail Gibbons
- Namesake: Abigail Gibbons
- Ordered: as type (EC2-S-C1) hull, MC hull 2379
- Builder: J.A. Jones Construction, Brunswick, Georgia
- Cost: $930,609
- Yard number: 164
- Way number: 6
- Laid down: 1 September 1944
- Launched: 12 October 1944
- Sponsored by: Mrs. W. Franklin Brown
- Completed: 25 October 1944
- Identification: Call Signal: KSZY
- Fate: Laid up in the National Defense Reserve Fleet, Mobile, Alabama, 30 September 1949; Sold for scrapping, 7 September 1971

General characteristics
- Class & type: Liberty ship; type EC2-S-C1, standard
- Tonnage: 10,865 LT DWT; 7,176 GRT
- Displacement: 3,380 long tons (3,434 t) (light); 14,245 long tons (14,474 t) (max)
- Length: 441 feet 6 inches (135 m) oa; 416 feet (127 m) pp; 427 feet (130 m) lwl
- Beam: 57 feet (17 m)
- Draft: 27 ft 9.25 in (8.4646 m)
- Installed power: 2 × Oil fired 450 °F (232 °C) boilers, operating at 220 psi (1,500 kPa); 2,500 hp (1,900 kW)
- Propulsion: 1 × triple-expansion steam engine, (manufactured by General Machinery Corp., Hamilton, Ohio); 1 × screw propeller
- Speed: 11.5 knots (21.3 km/h; 13.2 mph)
- Capacity: 562,608 cubic feet (15,931 m^{3}) (grain); 499,573 cubic feet (14,146 m^{3}) (bale)
- Complement: 38–62 USMM; 21–40 USNAG
- Armament: Varied by ship; Bow-mounted 3-inch (76 mm)/50-caliber gun; Stern-mounted 4-inch (102 mm)/50-caliber gun; 2–8 × single 20-millimeter (0.79 in) Oerlikon anti-aircraft (AA) cannons and/or, 2–8 × 37-millimeter (1.46 in) M1 AA guns

SS Abigail Gibbons was a Liberty ship built in the United States during World War II. She was named after Abigail Gibbons, an abolitionist and co-founder of the Women's Prison Association.

== Construction ==
Abigail Gibbons was laid down on 1 September 1944, under a United States Maritime Commission (MARCOM) contract, MC hull 2379, by J.A. Jones Construction, Brunswick, Georgia; she was sponsored by Mrs. W. Franklin Brown, daughter of Edwin L. Jones, and launched on 12 October 1944.

== History ==
She was allocated to American Foreign Steamship Corporation, on 25 October 1944. On 30 September 1949, she was laid up in the National Defense Reserve Fleet, in Mobile, Alabama. On 7 September 1971, she was sold for $35,424.54 to Union Minerals & Alloys Co., to be scrapped. She was removed from the fleet on 20 September 1971.

== Bibliography ==
- "Jones Construction, Brunswick GA". ShipbuildingHistory.com. 13 October 2010.
- "Liberty Ships – World War II".
- Maritime Administration. "Abigail Gibbons". Ship History Database Vessel Status Card. U.S. Department of Transportation, Maritime Administration. Archived from the original on 12 December 2019.
- Davies, James (May 2004). "Specifications (As-Built)" (PDF). p. 23.
- "SS Abigail Gibbons".
