= SS Ralph Izard =

Liberty ship of WWII

History

United States
- Name: Ralph Izard
- Namesake: Ralph Izard
- Owner: War Shipping Administration (WSA)
- Operator: American Foreign Steamship Corp.
- Ordered: as type (EC2-S-C1) hull, MCE hull 914
- Awarded: 1 January 1942
- Builder: Bethlehem-Fairfield Shipyard, Baltimore, Maryland
- Cost: $1,042,919
- Yard number: 2064
- Way number: 4
- Laid down: 1 August 1942
- Launched: 12 September 1942
- Sponsored by: Mrs. Charles E. Keys
- Completed: 23 September 1942
- Identification: Call sign: KHCS
- Fate: Laid up in the National Defense Reserve Fleet, Mobile, Alabama, 5 September 1947; Sold for scrapping, 11 February 1965, withdrawn from fleet, 11 March 1965

General characteristics
- Class & type: Liberty ship; type EC2-S-C1, standard
- Tonnage: 10,865 LT DWT; 7,176 GRT
- Displacement: 3,380 long tons (3,434 t) (light); 14,245 long tons (14,474 t) (max)
- Length: 441 feet 6 inches (135 m) oa; 416 feet (127 m) pp; 427 feet (130 m) lwl
- Beam: 57 feet (17 m)
- Draft: 27 ft 9.25 in (8.4646 m)
- Installed power: 2 × Oil fired 450 °F (232 °C) boilers, operating at 220 psi (1,500 kPa); 2,500 hp (1,900 kW)
- Propulsion: 1 × triple-expansion steam engine, (manufactured by General Machinery Corp., Hamilton, Ohio); 1 × screw propeller
- Speed: 11.5 knots (21.3 km/h; 13.2 mph)
- Capacity: 562,608 cubic feet (15,931 m^{3}) (grain); 499,573 cubic feet (14,146 m^{3}) (bale)
- Complement: 38–62 USMM; 21–40 USNAG
- Armament: Varied by ship; Bow-mounted 3-inch (76 mm)/50-caliber gun; Stern-mounted 4-inch (102 mm)/50-caliber gun; 2–8 × single 20-millimeter (0.79 in) Oerlikon anti-aircraft (AA) cannons and/or, 2–8 × 37-millimeter (1.46 in) M1 AA guns

SS Ralph Izard was a Liberty ship built in the United States during World War II. She was named after Ralph Izard, an American politician. He was appointed commissioner to the Court of Tuscany by the Continental Congress in 1776, but was recalled in 1779. He returned to America in 1780, and pledged his large estate in South Carolina, for the payment of war ships to be used in the American Revolutionary War. He was a member of the Continental Congress in 1782 and 1783. In 1788, he was elected to the United States Senate and served from March 4, 1789, to March 4, 1795, serving as President pro tempore of the United States Senate during the Third Congress.

== Construction ==
Ralph Izard was laid down on 1 August 1942, under a Maritime Commission (MARCOM) contract, MCE hull 914, by the Bethlehem-Fairfield Shipyard, Baltimore, Maryland; she was sponsored by Mrs. Charles E. Keys, the wife of a yard employee, and was launched on 12 September 1942.

== History ==
She was allocated to American Foreign Steamship Corporation, on 23 September 1942. On 5 September 1947, she was laid up in the National Defense Reserve Fleet, Mobile, Alabama. On 11 February 1965, she was sold for scrapping to Union Minerals & Alloys Corp., for $48,225.89. She was removed from the fleet on 11 March 1965.

== Bibliography ==
- "Bethlehem-Fairfield, Baltimore MD". www.ShipbuildingHistory.com. 14 August 2008.
- Maritime Administration. "Ralph Izard". Ship History Database Vessel Status Card. U.S. Department of Transportation, Maritime Administration.
- Davies, James (May 2004). "Specifications (As-Built)" (PDF). p. 23.
- "SS Ralph Izard".
