= McMyler-Interstate Company =

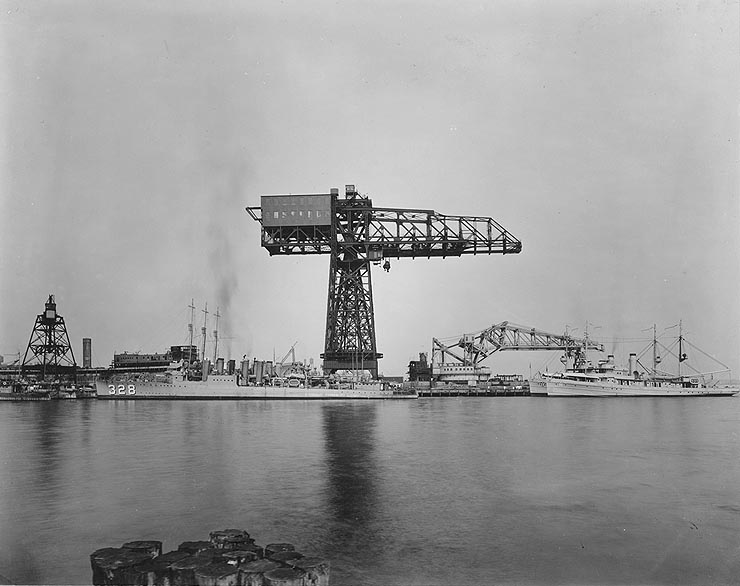
The "League Island Crane" with Clemson-class destroyer USS Lamson (DD-328) in the foreground.

The McMyler-Interstate Company, a pioneer in the design, development, and manufacturing of ore- and coal-handling equipment as well as a manufacturer of heavy industrial equipment, was established in 1910 as the result of a consolidation of four companies in the city of Bedford, Ohio:

- The Excelsior Iron Works, dating back to the 1870s
- The McMyler Manufacturing Co., dating back to the 1880s
- Kaltenbach & Griess, Consulting and Contracting Engineers, formed in 1897
- The Interstate Engineering Co., organized in 1902

Just after World War I, a 350-ton capacity hammerhead crane was ordered for the Philadelphia Naval Shipyard. Designed and built in Bedford in 1919, the crane was called the "League Island Crane" by its builder. Weighing 3,500 tons, the crane was shipped to the Navy yard in sections. At the time, it was the world's largest crane. The League Island Crane was for many years the Navy's largest crane.

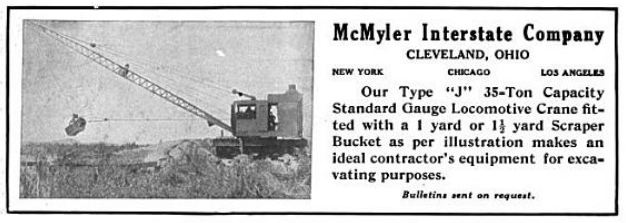
A 1912 advertisement highlighting the McMyler Interstate Company's Type J 35-Ton Capacity Standard Gauge Locomotive Crane fitted with a 1-yard or 1 yard Scraper Bucket

- Hog Island Cranes
- League Island Crane
