= SS Capillo =

Cargo ship launched 1920

History

United States
- Name: Capillo
- Owner: United States Shipping Board (1920–1921); Pioneer Steamship Company (1921–1922); United States Shipping Board (1922–1941)
- Builder: American International Shipbuilding Corporation, Philadelphia
- Yard number: 1523
- Launched: 26 March 1920
- Completed: 1920
- Identification: US Official Number 219904; code letters: LWHS
- Fate: Bombed and abandoned, 8 December 1941 scuttled, 11 December 1941 destroyed 29 December 1941

General characteristics
- Type: Design 1022 cargo ship
- Tonnage: 7,500 dwt
- Length: 390 ft (120 m)
- Beam: 54 ft (16 m)
- Draft: 27 ft 5 in (8.36 m)
- Installed power: Oil-fired steam turbines
- Propulsion: Single screw

SS Capillo was a Design 1022 cargo ship built for the United States Shipping Board immediately after World War I.

== History ==
She was laid down at yard number 1523 at the Philadelphia, Pennsylvania shipyard of the American International Shipbuilding Corporation, one of 110 Design 1022 cargo ships built for the United States Shipping Board. She was completed in 1920 and named the SS Capillo. In 1921, she was purchased by the Pioneer Steamship Company, Philadelphia. In 1922, she was returned to the United States Shipping Board.

The Japanese commenced near simultaneous attacks against U.S. forces in the Philippines, Guam, Wake Island, and Pearl Harbor; and against British and allied forces in Singapore and Hong Kong. On 8 December 1941, Japanese planes tasked with attacking shipping in Manila Bay, bombed and set her ablaze; she was then abandoned. On 11 December 1941, she was partially scuttled by a U.S. Army demolition party off Corregidor. On 29 December 1941, Japanese planes from the Takao Kokutai and the 1st Kokutai bombed Corregidor for the first time, setting her hulk ablaze. The Philippine freighter Don Jose is also set on fire; the presidential yacht BRP Banahaw (ex-Casania) is sunk; and the steamship Bicol and motor vessel Aloha are both scuttled. Six members of her crew were sent to Japanese POW camps.

== Bibliography ==
- McKellar, Norman L. "Steel Shipbuilding under the U. S. Shipping Board, 1917-1921, Part II, Contract Steel Ships, p. 588" (PDF). Steel Shipbuilding under the U. S. Shipping Board, 1917-1921. ShipScribe.
- Marine Review (1921). "1920 Construction Record of U.S. Yards". The Marine Review. 51 (February). New York: 99.
