= SS John Catron =

World War II Liberty ship of the United States

History

United States
- Name: John Catron
- Namesake: John Catron
- Owner: War Shipping Administration (WSA)
- Operator: American Foreign Steamship, Co.
- Ordered: as type (EC2-S-C1) hull, MC hull 1494
- Builder: J.A. Jones Construction, Brunswick, Georgia
- Cost: $2,126,882
- Yard number: 110
- Way number: 6
- Laid down: 3 September 1942
- Launched: 11 July 1943
- Completed: 31 July 1943
- Identification: Call Signal: KIQN
- Fate: Laid up in National Defense Reserve Fleet, Mobile, Alabama, 30 August 1949; Sold for scrapping, 9 November 1971

General characteristics
- Class & type: Liberty ship; type EC2-S-C1, standard
- Tonnage: 10,865 LT DWT; 7,176 GRT
- Displacement: 3,380 long tons (3,434 t) (light); 14,245 long tons (14,474 t) (max)
- Length: 441 feet 6 inches (135 m) oa; 416 feet (127 m) pp; 427 feet (130 m) lwl
- Beam: 57 feet (17 m)
- Draft: 27 ft 9.25 in (8.4646 m)
- Installed power: 2 × Oil fired 450 °F (232 °C) boilers, operating at 220 psi (1,500 kPa); 2,500 hp (1,900 kW)
- Propulsion: 1 × triple-expansion steam engine, (manufactured by General Machinery Corp., Hamilton, Ohio); 1 × screw propeller
- Speed: 11.5 knots (21.3 km/h; 13.2 mph)
- Capacity: 562,608 cubic feet (15,931 m^{3}) (grain); 499,573 cubic feet (14,146 m^{3}) (bale)
- Complement: 38–62 USMM; 21–40 USNAG
- Armament: Varied by ship; Bow-mounted 3-inch (76 mm)/50-caliber gun; Stern-mounted 4-inch (102 mm)/50-caliber gun; 2–8 × single 20-millimeter (0.79 in) Oerlikon anti-aircraft (AA) cannons and/or, 2–8 × 37-millimeter (1.46 in) M1 AA guns

SS John Catron was a Liberty ship built in the United States during World War II. She was named after John Catron, an Associate Justice of the Supreme Court of the United States.

== Construction ==
John Catron was laid down on 3 September 1942, under a United States Maritime Commission (MARCOM) contract, MC hull 1494, by J.A. Jones Construction, Brunswick, Georgia, and launched on 11 July 1943.

== History ==
She was allocated to American Foreign Steamship Corporation, on 31 July 1943. On 30 August 1949, she entered the National Defense Reserve Fleet in Mobile, Alabama. She was sold to Andy Equipment, Inc., Houston, Texas, on 9 November 1971, and delivered for scrapping on 10 December 1971.

== Bibliography ==
- "Jones Construction, Brunswick GA". ShipbuildingHistory.com. 13 October 2010.
- "Liberty Ships – World War II".
- Maritime Administration. "John Catron". Ship History Database Vessel Status Card. U.S. Department of Transportation, Maritime Administration. Archived from the original on 12 December 2019.
- Davies, James (May 2004). "Specifications (As-Built)" (PDF). p. 23.
- "SS John Catron".
