= Hog Island Cranes =

- U.S. National Register of Historic Places
- New Jersey Register of Historic Places
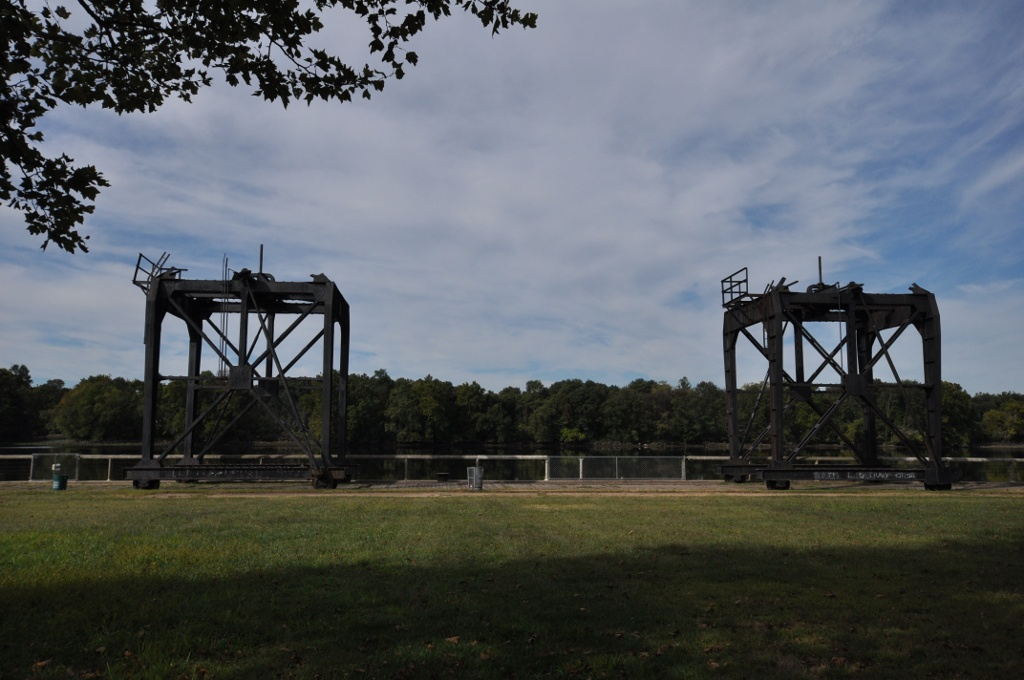

- Location within Mercer County, New Jersey Location within New Jersey Location within the United States
- Location: Trenton Marine Terminal, Trenton, New Jersey
- Coordinates: 40°11′28.7″N 74°45′22.9″W
- Built: 1917
- Architect: McMyler-Interstate Company
- NRHP reference No.: 80002500
- NJRHP No.: 1772

Significant dates
- Added to NRHP: June 17, 1980
- Designated NJRHP: February 1, 1980

The Hog Island Cranes, located in Trenton, New Jersey, are two of 28 locomotive steam gantry cranes built in 1917 by the McMyler-Interstate Company of Cleveland, Ohio, for the Hog Island, Philadelphia, shipyard. They helped produce warships during World War I, are representative of an important era of heavy lifting equipment, and played an important role in 20th-century waterfront technology. They were added to the National Register of Historic Places on June 17, 1980, for their significance in commerce, engineering, industry, and transportation.

== History and description ==
The two cranes now in Trenton were sold as government surplus in 1930 to the municipal government for $5,000, a fifth of the original cost, and were installed at the Trenton Marine Terminal in 1932. The cranes had a 15-ton capacity and are mounted on tracks that run 1,700 feet (520 m) along the Delaware River waterfront at Trenton's southern limits. They were overhauled in 1952 and stand about 40 feet (12 m) tall. Only the substructure of the cranes is currently in place.

== See also ==
- Hog Island, Philadelphia
- National Register of Historic Places listings in Mercer County, New Jersey
