= SS Fort Battle River =

Canadian Fort ship

History

United Kingdom
- Name: Fort Battle River
- Owner: Ministry of War Transport
- Builder: North Van Ship Repair, North Vancouver
- Yard number: 105
- Completed: 29 July 1942
- Fate: Torpedoed and sunk 6 March 1943

General characteristics
- Class & type: North Sands-type Fort ship
- Tonnage: 7,133 GRT
- Length: 441 ft 6 in (134.57 m)
- Beam: 57 ft 2 in (17.42 m)
- Draught: 26 ft 11.5 in (8.217 m)
- Propulsion: 3 cyl triple expansion steam; 2500 ihp; One shaft.
- Speed: 11 knots (13 mph; 20 km/h)
- Range: 11,400 nmi (21,100 km) at 10 kn (12 mph; 19 km/h)
- Complement: 115
- Armament: During the Second World War: 1 × 4-inch (100 mm) gun; 8 × 20mm AA guns

SS Fort Battle River was a Canadian-owned Fort ship that saw service as a cargo ship during World War II. It was torpedoed by U-410 on 6 March 1943 and sank on 9 March.

== Description ==
Fort Battle River was a North Sands-type cargo ship with a tonnage of 7,133 GRT. It was given the hull number 105. It was equipped with a triple expansion engine that 505 nominal horsepower for a speed of 11 knots. The crew was entirely British, and ranged in size from 48 in September 1942 to 45 in March 1943.

== History ==
The ship was completed by North Vancouver Ship Repair on 29 July 1942. On 6 March 1943, the ship departed Glasgow, Scotland, for Bone, Algeria, as part of the merchant convoy KMS-10. Later that day, the German submarine U-410 attacked the convoy while it was off the coast of Portugal, striking Fort Battle River and Fort Paskoyac with torpedoes. The damage to Paskoyac was minimized by a torpedo protection net, but Battle River was crippled. The ship's full complement of 45 crew, 10 gunners, and 9 passengers were rescued by HMCS Shediac and SS Empire Flamingo and taken to Gibraltar. Three days later, on 9 March, the ship fully sank.
