= SS Quistconck =

Cargo ship launched 1918

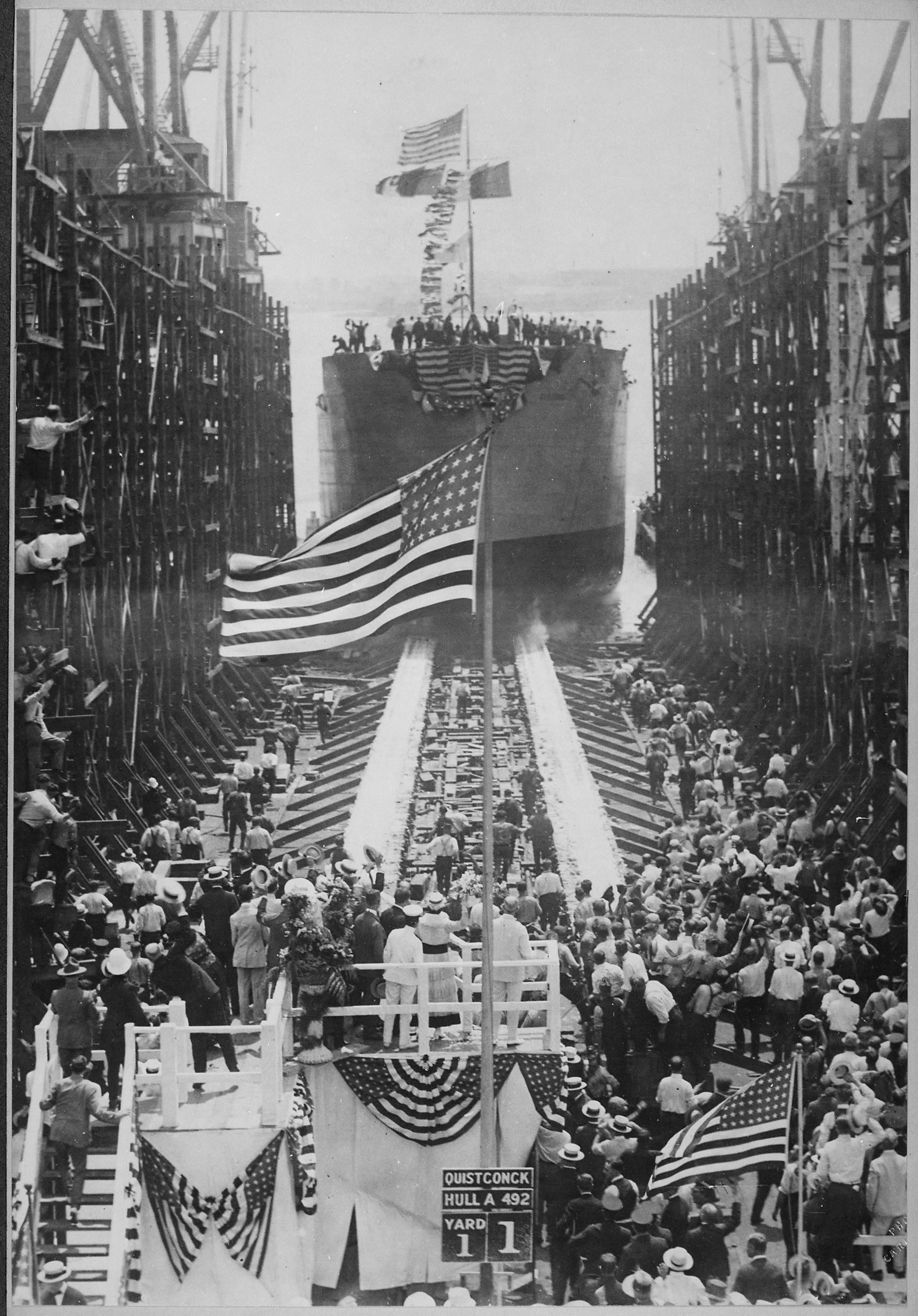
- The launch of Quistconck, 5 August 1918

History
- Name: Red Jacket (1918); Quistconck (1918–41); Empire Falcon (1941–46); Barnby (1946–52); Mariandrea (1952–53)
- Owner: United States Shipping Board (1918–33); Lykes Brothers - Ripley Steamship Co Inc (1933–41); Ministry of War Transport (1941–45); Ministry of Transport (1945–46); Rowland & Marwoods Steamship Co Ltd (1946–52); Societa de Navigazione Maliveras SA (1952–53)
- Operator: United States Shipping Board (1918–33); Lykes Brothers - Ripley Steamship Co Inc (1933–37); Lykes Coastwise Lines Inc (1933–41); Headlam & Son Ltd (1941–46); Rowland & Marwoods Steamship Co Ltd (1946–52); Societa de Navigazione Maliveras SA (1952–53)
- Port of registry: (United States) Philadelphia, PA, USA (1918–33); (United States) New Orleans, LA, USA (1933–41); (United Kingdom) London, UK (1941–52); Panama City, Panama (1952–53)
- Builder: American International Shipbuilding Corp.
- Yard number: 1
- Way number: 1
- Laid down: 18 February 1918
- Launched: 5 August 1918
- Christened: 5 August 1918
- Completed: November 1918
- Out of service: March 1953
- Identification: United States Official Number 217144 (1918–41); United Kingdom Official Number 168079 (1941–52); Code Letters LNMB (1918–34); Code Letters WREI (1934–41); Code Letters GNCN (1941–52)
- Fate: Scrapped
- Notes: First Hog Islander built

General characteristics
- Class & type: Design 1022 Hog Islander
- Tonnage: 5,144 GRT; 3,072 NRT; 7,500 DWT
- Length: 390 ft 0 in (118.87 m)
- Beam: 54 ft 2 in (16.51 m)
- Draught: 24 ft 5 in (7.44 m)
- Depth: 27 ft 2 in (8.28 m)
- Installed power: 600 nhp
- Propulsion: Steam turbine, double reduction geared, single screw propeller
- Speed: 11 knots (20 km/h)
- Armament: 1 × 4-inch or 4.7 inch gun, 6 x machine guns, kites (1942); 1 × 4-inch or 4.7-inch gun, 1 x Bofors gun, 6 x machine guns (1944); 1 × 4-inch or 4.7-inch gun, 1 x Bofors gun, 4 x machine guns (1945)

Quistconck was a 5,144 GRT Design 1022 Hog Islander that was laid down as Red Jacket in 1918 by the Stone & Webster subsidiary American International Shipbuilding Corp., Hog Island, Philadelphia, Pennsylvania, United States for the United States Shipping Board (USSB). Launched as Quistconck, she was sold to Lykes Brothers - Ripley Steamship Co Inc in 1933. In 1941, she was passed to the Ministry of War Transport (MoWT) and renamed Empire Falcon. She was sold into merchant service in 1946 and renamed Barnby. A sale to a Panamanian company saw her renamed Mariandrea. She served until 1953, when she was scrapped.

== Description ==
The ship was built in 1918 by the American International Shipbuilding Corp., Hog Island, Philadelphia, Pennsylvania.

The ship was 390 feet 0 inches (118.87 m) long, with a beam of 54 feet 2 inches (16.51 m). She had a depth of 27 feet 6 inches (8.38 m), and a draught of 24 feet 5 inches (7.44 m). She was assessed at 5,144 GRT, 3,072 NRT, 7,500 DWT.

The ship was propelled by a steam turbine, double reduction geared, driving a single screw propeller. The turbine was made by General Electric Co Inc, Schenectady, New York. It was rated at 600 nhp. The turbine could propel her at 11 knots (20 km/h).

== History ==
=== Pre WWII ===
Laid down as Red Jacket, Quistconck was the first Hog Islander built. Her keel was laid on 18 February 1918. She was built on way number 1 of the American International's shipyard. It took 1,160,000 man-hours to construct her, partly because the shipyard was still under construction at the same time Quistconck was (the next ship only needed 601,00 man-hours to complete and third required only 400,000 man-hours). She was christened on 5 August 1918 by Edith Bolling Galt Wilson, wife of American President Woodrow Wilson and launched that day in front of 60,000 spectators. Due to the hot weather at the time, there were no speeches. Immediately following the launch, the keel of the next ship was laid. She was built for the USSB. The United States Official Number 217144 and Code Letters LNMB were allocated. Quistconck was delivered on 3 December 1918.

In 1933, Quistconck was sold to Lykes Brothers - Ripley Steamship Co Inc. Her port of registry was changed to New Orleans, Louisiana, and the vessel engaged in freight service between the Gulf of Mexico and the Mediterranean. Following the changes to Code Letters in 1934, Quistconck was allocated the Code Letters WREI. In 1937, she was transferred to Lykes Coastwise Lines Inc. Several photos of this vessel can be found in the September, 1937 issue of Fortune magazine, including a picture of the vessel loading scrap steel and a photo of Chief Engineer Charles B. Brown, who had sailed on Quistconk for its entire career up to that time.

=== WWII ===
In 1941, Quistconck was transferred to the MoWT. She was placed under the management of Headlam & Son Ltd. The United Kingdom Official Number 168079 and Code Letters GNCN were allocated. Her port of registry was London. She reached the United Kingdom as a member of Convoy SC 20, which departed from Halifax, Nova Scotia, Canada on 22 January 1941 and arrived at Liverpool, Lancashire on 8 February. She was carrying a cargo of scrap and steel and was bound for Hull, Yorkshire.

Empire Falcon departed from the Clyde on 23 April 1941 to join Convoy OB 313, which had departed from Liverpool the previous day and dispersed at sea on 28 April. She was bound for Jacksonville, Florida, United States, where she arrived on 12 May. She departed two days later for Savannah, Georgia, arriving later that day. She sailed on 1 June for Halifax, arriving on 6 June. Empire Falcon returned to the United Kingdom with Convoy HX 132, which departed on 10 June and arrived at Liverpool on 28 June. Her captain was criticized by the Convoy Commodore for very bad station keeping and signalling. She was carrying scrap steel and special cargo, and arrived at the Clyde on 28 June.

Empire Falcon sailed on 18 July to join Convoy OB 348, which had departed from Liverpool the previous day and arrived at Halifax on 31 July. She arrived at Halifax on 2 August, sailing three days later for New Orleans, Louisiana, United States, where she arrived on 13 August. Empire Falcon departed on 24 August for Halifax, arriving on 2 September. She was a member of Convoy HX 151, which departed on 22 September and arrived at Liverpool on 7 October. Her cargo was sulphur, which was delivered to the Clyde on 5 October.

Empire Falcon sailed on 1 November to join Convoy ON 32, which had departed from Liverpool that day and arrived at Halifax on 16 November. She left the convoy off Halifax and sailed to New York, United States, arriving on 19 November. She sailed for Halifax on 6 December, arriving three days later. Empire Falcon was a member of Convoy HX 167, which departed on 27 December and arrived at Liverpool on 11 January 1942. She was carrying general cargo, which was delivered to the Clyde on 10 January.

Empire Falcon sailed on 25 February to join Convoy ON 70, which had departed from Liverpool that day and dispersed at sea on 15 March. She returned to the Clyde, arriving on 27 February. She sailed again on 6 March to join Convoy ON 73, which had departed from Liverpool the previous day and dispersed at 41°57′N 60°15′W on 16 March. She was bound for New York, which was reached on 20 April following calls at Philadelphia, Pennsylvania and Baltimore, Maryland. Empire Falcon sailed on 21 April for Halifax, arriving two days later. Carrying general cargo, she joined Convoy HX 187, which departed on 26 April and arrived at Liverpool on 8 May. She left the convoy at the Belfast Lough, joining convoy BB 172, which sailed on 9 May and arrived at Milford Haven, Pembrokeshire the next day. Her destination was Cardiff, Glamorgan, where she arrived on 11 May.

Empire Falcon sailed on 19 May for Swansea, arriving the next day. She departed on 29 May for Milford Haven, where she arrived later that day. She sailed two days later to join Convoy OS 30, which departed from Liverpool on 1 June and arrived at Freetown, Sierra Leone on 19 June. Her armament consisted a 4-inch or 4.7-in gun, six machine guns and a number of kites. She was carrying a cargo of military stores bound for Cape Town, South Africa, which was reached on 3 July. She departed six days later for Aden, arriving on 26 July and sailing the next day for Massawa, Eritrea. where she arrived on 29 July. Empire Falcon departed on 3 August for Suez, Egypt, arriving five days later. She sailed on 2 September for Cape Town, where she arrived on 25 September. She sailed on 30 September for Saint Thomas, United States Virgin Islands, arriving on 24 October. She departed two days later for San Juan, Puerto Rico, where she arrived later that day. She sailed three days later for Guantánamo Bay, Cuba. Empire Falcon was a member of Convoy GN 17, which departed on 3 November and arrived at New York on 10 November. She then made a round trip to Baltimore, arriving back at New York on 6 December before joining Convoy NG 328, which departed on 10 December and arrived at Guantanamo Bay on 18 December. She then joined Convoy GZ 16, which departed that day and arrived at Cristóbal, Canal Zone on 21 December. Empire Falcon then sailed to Balboa, Panama, from where she departed on 23 December for Valparaíso, Chile, arriving on 4 January 1943.

Empire Falcon sailed on 6 January for Punta Arenas, arriving six days later. She then sailed to Durban, South Africa, where she arrived on 2 February. She was a member of Convoy DN 16, which sailed on 10 February and dispersed at sea two days later. She arrived at Aden on 26 February, sailing that day for Suez, where she arrived on 4 March. Empire Falcon then sailed to Port Said, from where she departed on 6 March for Alexandria, arriving on 8 March.Empire Falcon then joined Convoy MW 25, which departed on 5 April and arrived at Malta on 12 April. She was in the part of the convoy that formed Convoy XT 9 at sea on 11 April and arrived at Tripoli, Libya that day. She departed on 26 April with Convoy TX 9, which joined with Convoy ME 24 at sea the next day. Empire Falcon was towing Daltonhall, which had been damaged when she struck a wreck on arrival at Tripoli on 11 April. Convoy ME 24 had departed from Malta on 25 April and arrived at Alexandria on 1 May. Daltonhall was towed to Port Said, arriving on 2 May. She sailed that day for Port Said, arriving the next day. Empire Falcon was a member of Convoy MW 29, which departed on 25 May and arrived at Malta on 31 May. She was in the portion of the convoy that formed Convoy XT 15 at sea on 29 May and arrived at Tripoli that day. She sailed on 8 June to join Convoy KMS 15, which had departed from Gibraltar on 31 May and arrived at Port Said on 14 June. She sailed on 15 July for Alexandria, arriving the next day. Empire Falcon then joined convoy MWS 38, which departed on 18 July and arrived at Syracuse, Sicily, Italy on 24 July. Her destination was Tripoli, where she arrived on 28 July. She sailed on 3 August to join Convoy KMS 21, which had departed from Gibraltar on 29 July and arrived at Port Said on 9 August.

Empire Falcon then sailed to Suez, from where she departed on 14 September for Safaga, arriving the next day and sailing three days later for Aden, where she arrived on 24 September. She joined Convoy AKD 2, which departed on 30 September and arrived at Kilindini, Kenya on 10 October. She then joined Convoy AKD 2A, which departed on 11 October and arrived at Durban on 19 October. She departed the next day for Cape Town, arriving on 24 October. Empire Falcon departed on 27 November for Lourenço Marques, Mozambique, where she arrived on 2 December. She sailed eight days later for Aden, arriving on 25 December and sailing that day for Suez, where she arrived on 31 December.

Empire Falcon then sailed to Port Said, from where she sailed on 2 January 1944 for Alexandria, arriving the next day. She joined Convoy GUS 28, which departed on 15 January and arrived at the Hampton Roads on 15 February. She left the convoy at Gibraltar, where she arrived on 26 January. She sailed on 5 February to join Convoy OS 66, which formed at sea that day and arrived at Freetown on 15 February. She joined Convoy STL 12, which departed on 22 February and arrived at Lagos, Nigeria on 29 February. Empire Falcon left the convoy at Takoradi, Gold Coast on 27 February. She sailed on 29 February for Lagos, arriving on 2 March and sailing that day for Douala, Cameroun, where she arrived two days later. She sailed on 17 March for Lagos, arriving two days later. Empire Falcon was a member of Convoy LTS 14, which departed on 20 March and arrived at Freetown on 27 March. She joined Convoy SL 154, which departed on 1 April and rendezvoused at sea with convoy MKS 45 on 11 April. MKS 45 had departed from Gibraltar on 10 April. The combined convoys arrived at Liverpool on 23 April. She was carrying a cargo of logs, palm kernels and rubber.

Empire Falcon was a member of Convoy OS78KM, which departed on 22 May and split at sea on 4 June to form convoys OS 78 and KMS 52. OS 78 arrived at Freetown on 14 June. Empire Falcon was in the portion of the convoy that formed KMS 52G and arrived at Gibraltar on 6 June. She was carrying a cargo of stores bound for Malta. Her armament consisted a 4-inch or 4.7 inch gun, a Bofors gun and six machine guns. She joined Convoy KMS 52, which departed that day and arrived at Port Said on 16 June. She arrived at Malta on 11 June, sailing eight days later to join Convoy GUS.43, which had departed from Port Said on 13 June and arrived at the Hampton Roads on 10 July. She left the convoy at Algiers, Algeria due to defects, arriving on 23 June. Defects rectified, she sailed on 2 July to join Convoy GUS 44, which had departed from Port Said on 24 June and arrived at the Hampton Roads on 18 July. Empire Falcon sailed on to New York, from where she departed on 2 August to join convoy UGS 50, which departed from the Hampton Roads on 3 August and arrived at Port Said on 29 August. She put into Philadelphia with defects, arriving on 4 August.

Empire Falcon sailed for the Hampton Roads on 10 August, arriving that day. She was a member of Convoy UGS 51, which departed on 13 August and arrived at Port Said on 8 September. Empire Falcon then sailed to Suez, from where she departed on 14 September for Aden, arriving on 20 September. She sailed two days later for Karachi, India, where she arrived on 28 September. Empire Falcon departed on 5 October for Bombay, arriving two days later. She sailed on 27 November for Mauritius, arriving on 9 December and sailing on 24 December for Aden.

Empire Falcon arrived at Aden on 6 January 1945 and sailed that day for Port Sudan, Sudan, arriving on 10 January. She sailed the next day for Suez, where she arrived on 14 January before sailing to Port Said. She departed on 15 January for Alexandria, arriving two days later. Empire Falcon sailed on 26 January for Haifa, Palestine, arriving the next day. She departed on 3 February for Gibraltar, where she arrived on 11 February. She was a member of Convoy MKS83G, which departed on 14 February and arrived at Liverpool on 22 February. Her cargo was fruit. She left the convoy at the Clyde.

Empire Falcon sailed on 2 April to join Convoy OS 120KM, which departed from Liverpool that day and arrived at Gibraltar as Convoy KMS 94G on 11 April. She was carrying a cargo of Coke, potatoes and vehicles. Her armament consisted a 4-inch or 4.7-inch gun, a Bofors gun and four machine guns. She passed Gibraltar and arrived at Naples, Italy on 15 April. She departed on 19 April for an undisclosed destination, arriving back at Naples on 1 May and sailing that day for Gibraltar, where she arrived on 5 May. She sailed immediately for Casablanca, Morocco, arriving on 6 May.

=== Post-war ===
Empire Falcon sailed on 25 May to join Convoy GUS 91, which had departed from Oran, Algeria on 22 May and arrived at the Hampton Roads on 8 June. She sailed on to Baltimore, from where she departed on 12 July for New York, arriving the next day. She departed on 25 July for Naples, arriving on 13 August and sailing on 25 August for Gibraltar, where she arrived on 29 August. Empire Falcon sailed on 11 September for Montevideo, Uruguay, where she arrived on 9 October. She departed on 26 October for Necochea, Argentina, arriving two days later and departing on 1 November for Rio de Janeiro, where she arrived on 13 November. She sailed eight days later for the Cape Verde Islands, arriving on 4 December and sailing again that day.

In 1946, Empire Falcon was sold to Rowland & Marwoods Steamship Co Ltd and renamed Barnby. In 1952, Barnby was sold to Societa de Navigazione Maliveras SA, Panama and renamed Mariandrea. She served until 1953, arriving at Troon, Ayrshire in March for scrapping.
