= USS Guilford =

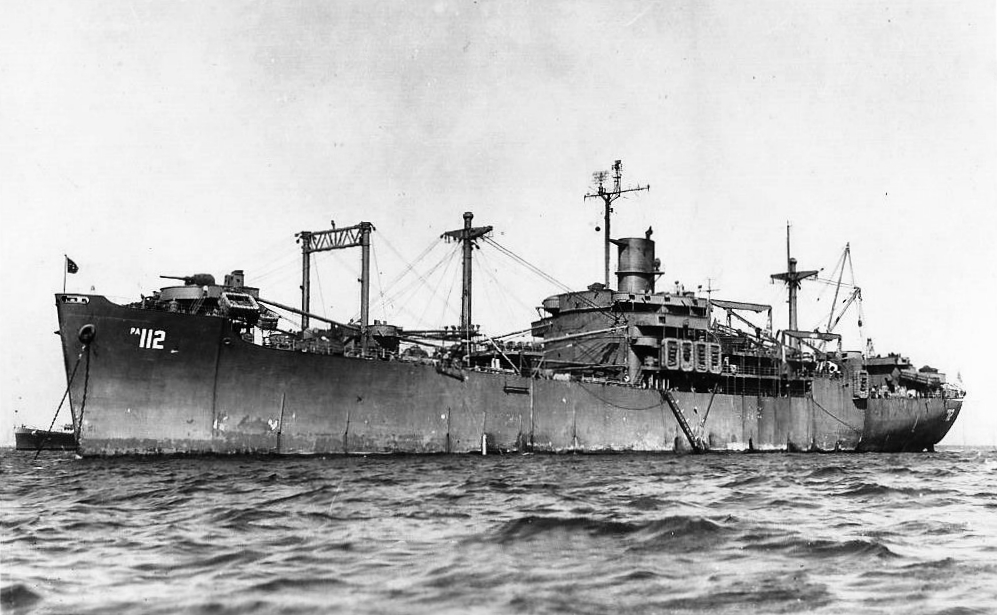

History

United States
- Name: USS Guilford
- Namesake: Guilford County, North Carolina
- Builder: Ingalls Shipbuilding, Pascagoula, Mississippi
- Launched: 14 July 1944
- Commissioned: 14 May 1945
- Decommissioned: 29 May 1946
- Fate: Sold into merchant service, May 1947; scrapped, 1976

General characteristics
- Class & type: Bayfield-class attack transport
- Displacement: 8,100 long tons (8,230 t) light; 16,100 long tons (16,358 t) full
- Length: 492 ft 6 in (150.11 m)
- Beam: 69 ft 6 in (21.18 m)
- Draft: 26 ft 6 in (8.08 m)
- Propulsion: General Electric geared turbine, 2 combustion engineering "D"-type boilers, single propeller
- Speed: 18 knots (33 km/h; 21 mph)
- Boats & landing craft carried: 12 × LCVPs; 4 × LCMs (Mk-6); 3 × LCPLs (Mk-IV)
- Capacity: 180,500 cubic feet, 4,500 tons cargo
- Troops: 80 officers, 1,146 enlisted men; Flag Accommodation: 43 officers, 108 enlisted men
- Complement: 51 officers, 524 enlisted men
- Armament: 2 × single 5-inch/38-caliber guns (fore and aft); 2 × single 40 mm AA guns; 2 × twin 40 mm AA guns; 18 × single 20 mm AA guns

USS Guilford (APA-112) was a Bayfield-class attack transport in service with the United States Navy from 1945 to 1946. She was sold into commercial service in 1947 and was scrapped in 1976.

== History ==
USS Guilford was named for Guilford County, North Carolina, she was the only U.S. Naval vessel to bear the name. She was laid down (date unknown) as a Maritime Commission type (C3-S-A2) hull under Maritime Commission contract (MCV hull 873) by the Ingalls Shipbuilding Corporation of Pascagoula, Mississippi; launched on 14 July 1944; sponsored by Mrs. Thomas Lowry Bailey, wife of the Governor of the State; converted to an attack transport by Waterman Steamship Corporation of Mobile, Alabama; and commissioned there on 14 May 1945.

=== U.S. Navy (1945–1947) ===
After shakedown in the Gulf of Mexico, Guilford sailed for Newport, Rhode Island. Arriving on 22 June 1945 she served as a training ship for pre-commissioning crews until 30 July. Guilford then took on board cargo and troops at Norfolk, Virginia and sailed for the Pacific via San Diego. After off-loading troops at Iwo Jima and in the Japanese home islands, Guilford was attached to "Operation Magic Carpet" on 18 October. In two round trips from San Diego to Guam, Saipan, Okinawa, and Japan, she transported over 5,000 veterans back to the United States for discharge as well as carrying out troops for the occupation of Japan. Returning to San Diego on 6 March 1946 from her final Pacific voyage, Guilford embarked passengers for the East Coast and sailed for Norfolk via the Panama Canal on 15 March. Guilford reached Norfolk on 31 March and decommissioned there on 29 May 1946. She returned to the Maritime Commission on 31 May 1946.

=== In mercantile service (1947–1976) ===
Guilford was sold in May 1947 to Pope and Talbot Lines, and was renamed SS P&T Navigator. In 1963 she was resold to the American Foreign Steamship Corporation and renamed SS American Oriole. The ship was scrapped in 1976.
