= Hog Islander =

Ship type

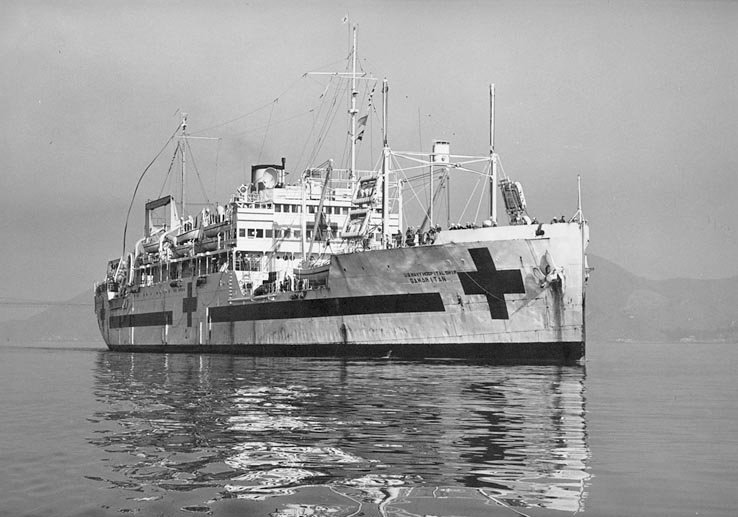
- USS Samaritan in San Francisco Bay, late 1945 or early 1946

Class overview
- Builders: American International Shipbuilding
- Subclasses: Design 1022 (110); Design 1024 (12)
- Built: 5 August 1918 – 29 January 1921
- Planned: 180
- Completed: 122
- Canceled: 58
- Lost: 58

General characteristics
- Type: Cargo ship (1022); Troop transport (1024)
- Tonnage: 7,825 DWT (1022)
- Displacement: 8,400 tons (12 × 1024); 13,400 tons (12 × 1024)
- Installed power: Oil-fired geared turbine 2,500 shp (1,900 kW)
- Speed: 15 knots (28 km/h; 17 mph)

Hog Islander is the slang for American ships built to Emergency Fleet Corporation designs number 1022 and 1024. These vessels were cargo ships and troop transports, respectively, built under government direction and subsidy to address a shortage of ships in the United States Merchant Marine during World War I. American International Shipbuilding, subsidized by the United States Shipping Board, built an emergency shipyard on Hog Island at the site of the present-day Philadelphia International Airport.

No ships were produced in time to participate in World War I, but many ships were active in World War II, with roughly half of those produced at Hog Island being sunk in that conflict. During the planning stage, 120 ship names based on the "aboriginal inhabitants of the United States" were selected by First Lady Edith Wilson (Mrs. Woodrow Wilson), although most were changed before completion.

== Emergency Fleet Corporation ==
Emergency Fleet Corporation (EFC) was formed by the US Shipping Board to acquire, design and build sufficient shipping for the US to conduct operations in World War I. The EFC found that US shipyards were too few and small to meet the needs; contracts were awarded to foreign yards in Japan and China. The EFC also contracted with private companies to form new yards, called "Agency Yards". These would be assembly yards, building prefabricated ships, rather than using traditional methods.

== Hog Island ==
Hog Island in Philadelphia, Pennsylvania, was the first shipyard ever built for mass production of ships from fabricated parts and sub-assemblies, produced at dozens of subcontractors. It had 50 slipways, seven wet docks and a detention basin. Only two basic designs, EFC 1022 and EFC 1024, were to be fabricated at the yard, these became collectively known as "Hog Islanders". The Type A design (1022) was a cargo carrier and the Type B (1024) was a troop transport. Both were simple designs geared toward mass production and aesthetic considerations were ignored. These were very modern in design except for the aesthetics. The vessels were fueled by oil rather than coal, with modern geared turbines of 2,500 shaft horsepower (1,900 kW) capable of producing up to 15 knots (28 km/h; 17 mph).

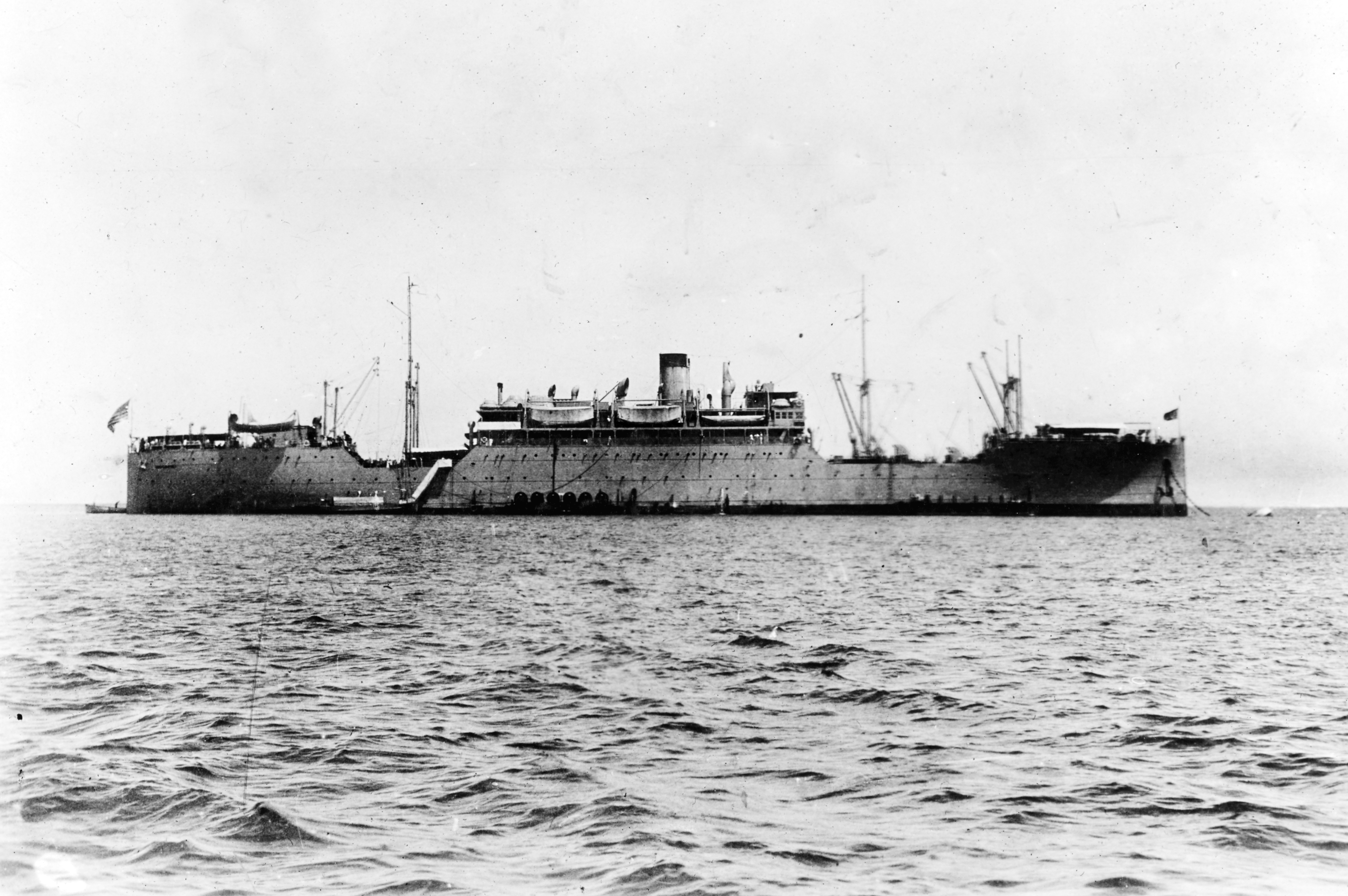
USS Chaumont: designed with symmetry between bow and stern to confuse an enemy

The design had a minimum of frills with no sheer, resulting in a squat, angular silhouette. The hulls were symmetrical from the sides. The combination produced an unconventional look and profile. These ships were considered ugly but well built and had good performance in terms of capacity and speed. The profile created a form of camouflage because the lack of sheer in the bow, high stern, and the evenly balanced superstructure, made it difficult for submarines to tell which direction the ships were going. The Hog Island contract was for 180 ships, but only 122 were completed, and none were completed in time to be used before the war ended. The first ship, SS Quistconck, was launched on 5 August 1918, and the last of 122 ships on 29 January 1921. Though not effective in World War I, these ships were used extensively by the military and Merchant Marine. Fifty-eight, nearly half, of the Hog Islanders were sunk during World War II. The Liberty ships built during World War II used a similar concept of production, but a completely different design.

=== Type B ===
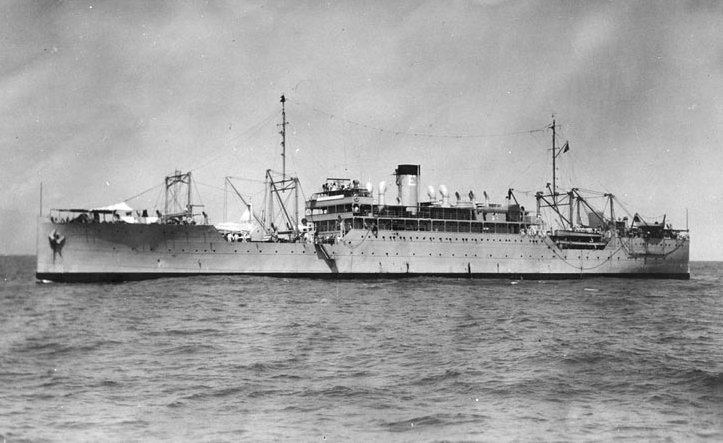
USS Argonne a Type B transport converted to a tender, circa 1930

Only 24 Type B troop transports were produced. Twelve of the Type B ships were built with 8,400-ton displacements, one of which became the US Navy USS Argonne. Another twelve were built with 13,400-ton displacements, an example of which was the US Navy hospital ship USS Samaritan, which was active in World War II.

== Notable Hog Islanders ==
- USS Argonne
- SS Capillo
- USS Capella (ex-Comerant)
- SS City of Flint
- SS Liberty Glo
- SS Robin Moor
- USS Samaritan
- USAT St. Mihiel / USS St. Mihiel (AP-32) / USAHS St. Mihiel

== Sources ==
- De La Pedraja, Rene, A Historical Dictionary of the U.S. Merchant Marine and Shipping Industry Since the Introduction of Steam, Greenwood Press (Westport, CT: n.d.), 1994; ISBN 0-313-27225-5
- de Tankerville, R. (1918). "Note, page 545". Shipping (16 March 1918). New York: Shipping Publishing Company: 545.
- Jones, David H. (2003). "The Hog Islanders". The Ship Modeller Mailing List Website. Archived from the original on 19 April 2015.
