= Hog Island, Philadelphia =

Hog Island
- Neighborhood of Philadelphia
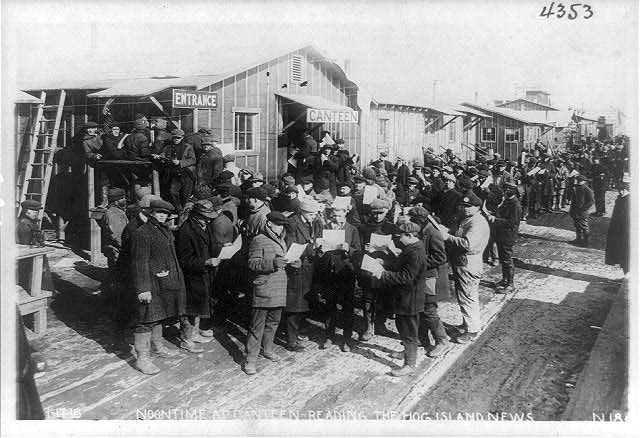
- Workers reading The Hog Island News in 1918

- Location within Philadelphia
- Coordinates: 39°52′19″N 75°14′28″W
- Country: United States
- State: Pennsylvania
- County: Delaware
- City: Tinicum Township
- Area codes: 215, 267 and 445

Hog Island is the historic name of an area along the Delaware River in Tinicum Township, Delaware County, Pennsylvania, United States. The area was once a part of Chester County until 1789, when Delaware County was established from a portion of Chester County. Hog Island is located in Delaware County, not Philadelphia. Part of Philadelphia International Airport now occupies Hog Island and the infilled channel behind it. It was the site of a major shipyard during World War I; sandwiches made for workers there may be the origin of the name "hoagie." The earliest references to the name "Hog Island" identified thus far appear on the 1752 Scull and Heap Map, "A Map of Philadelphia and Parts Adjacent," and in a 1767 Survey to Joseph Galloway.

== History ==
Swedish settler Otto Ernest Coch purchased Hog Island from the Lenape (Delaware) tribe in 1681. At the time of the purchase, the island was identified by a name recorded phonetically as "Quistconck," according to the Upland Court Minutes. The settlers gradually developed the island by building log and earthwork dikes to minimize storm damage and convert the marshes into meadows for grazing.

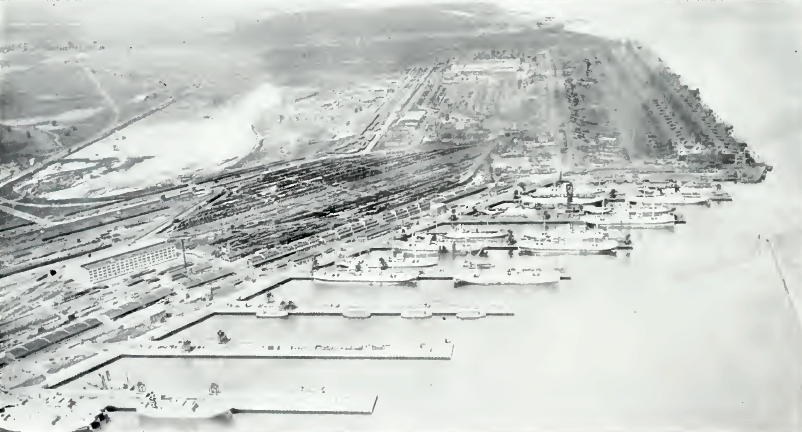
Aerial view of Emergency Fleet Corporation's Hog Island yard 1920.

In 1917, as part of the World War I effort, the U.S. government contracted American International Shipbuilding Corp. to build ships and a shipyard at Hog Island. At the time, Hog Island was the largest shipyard in the world, with 50 slipways.

In 1918, a 4.5-mile (7.2 km) rail line was built to connect Hog Island with Philadelphia: the 60th Street Branch of the Pennsylvania Railroad.

The first ship, named SS Quistconck for the Lenape name for the site, was christened August 5, 1918, by Edith Bolling Wilson, wife of U.S. President Woodrow Wilson. The shipbuilding process practiced on Hog Island was an early experiment in standardized construction of ships. The ships built there, known as "Hog Islanders", were considered ugly but well-built. In all, 122 craft were built, mostly cargo ships, and a few troop transports. The shipbuilding continued until 1921, after which the facility was rapidly demolished. None of the ships were ready in time to participate in World War I, but many of them were involved in World War II. Two of the locomotive steam gantry cranes were sold as surplus to the city of Trenton, New Jersey, where they remain today as the Hog Island Cranes, listed on the National Register of Historic Places. Another crane, a 20-ton industrial locomotive crane, was sold to the Hyde, McFarlan & Burke contracting company.

The U.S. Army Corps of Engineers filled in Bow Creek and Back Channel, separating Hog Island from the mainland with silt dredged from the shipping channels, making Hog Island part of the mainland.

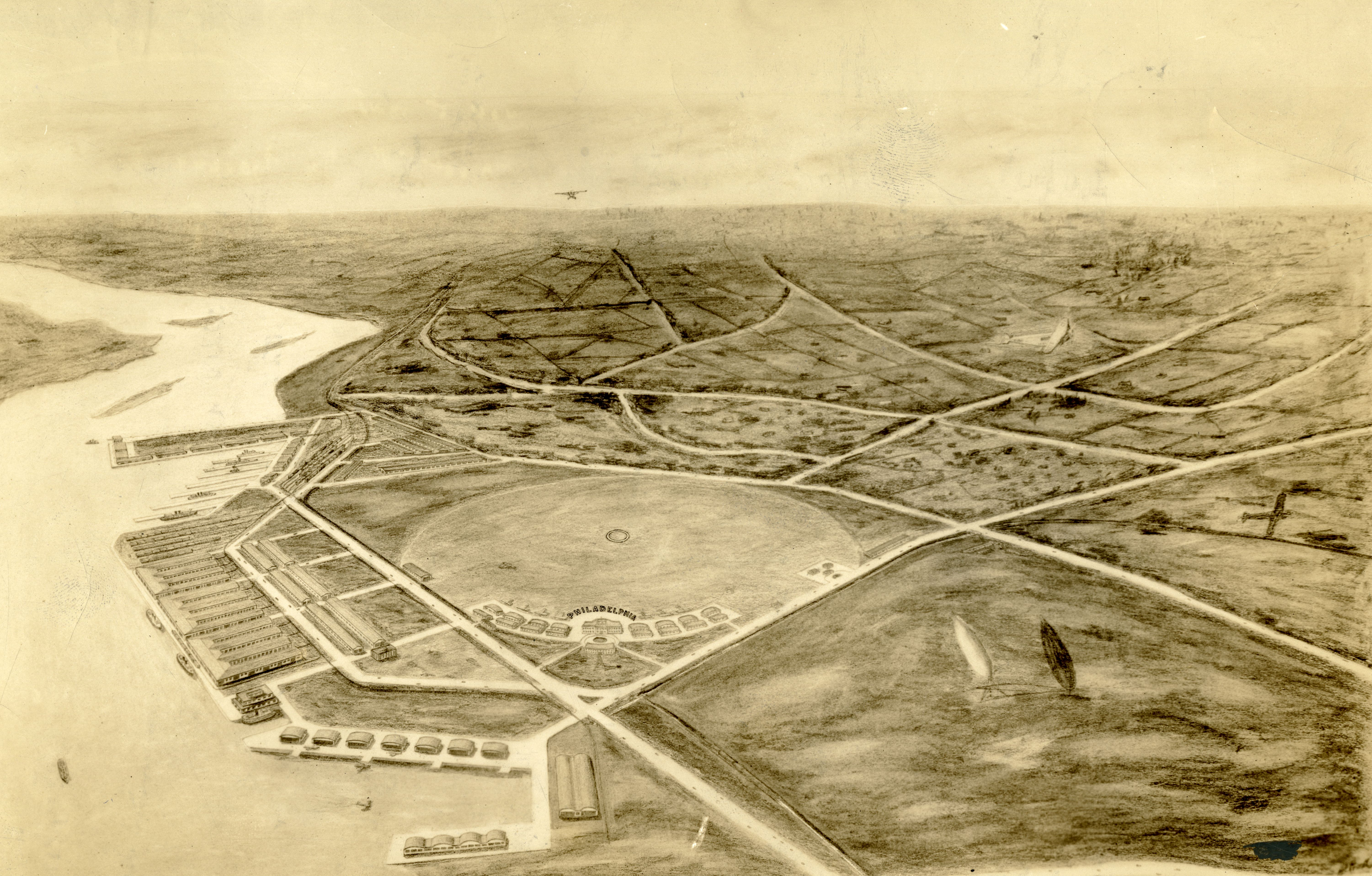
Hand-drawn site plan of future Philadelphia airport, date unknown.

Air operations began on Hog Island in 1925, when the Pennsylvania Air National Guard used a small part of it as a training field for its pilots. In 1927, the site was dedicated as the "Philadelphia Municipal Airport" by Charles Lindbergh, who flew in on the Spirit of Saint Louis. More than a decade would pass before the airport would become the region's main air hub. The city of Philadelphia bought Hog Island from the Federal government in 1930 for $3 million, but the Great Depression delayed work until 1937. In the meantime, Camden Central Airport, opened in 1929 in New Jersey, served as the city's main airport until Philadelphia Municipal Airport opened on June 20, 1940.

== In popular culture ==
One legend of the origin of the hoagie sandwich is tied to Hog Island. Domenic Vitiello, professor of Urban Studies at the University of Pennsylvania, asserts that Italians working on Hog Island in the old Navy Yard introduced the sandwich, by putting various meats, cheeses, and lettuce between two slices of bread. This became known as the "Hog Island" sandwich; hence, the "hoagie".

== See also ==
- Fort Mifflin
- Hog Islander
- Hog Island Cranes
