= Maritime history of California =

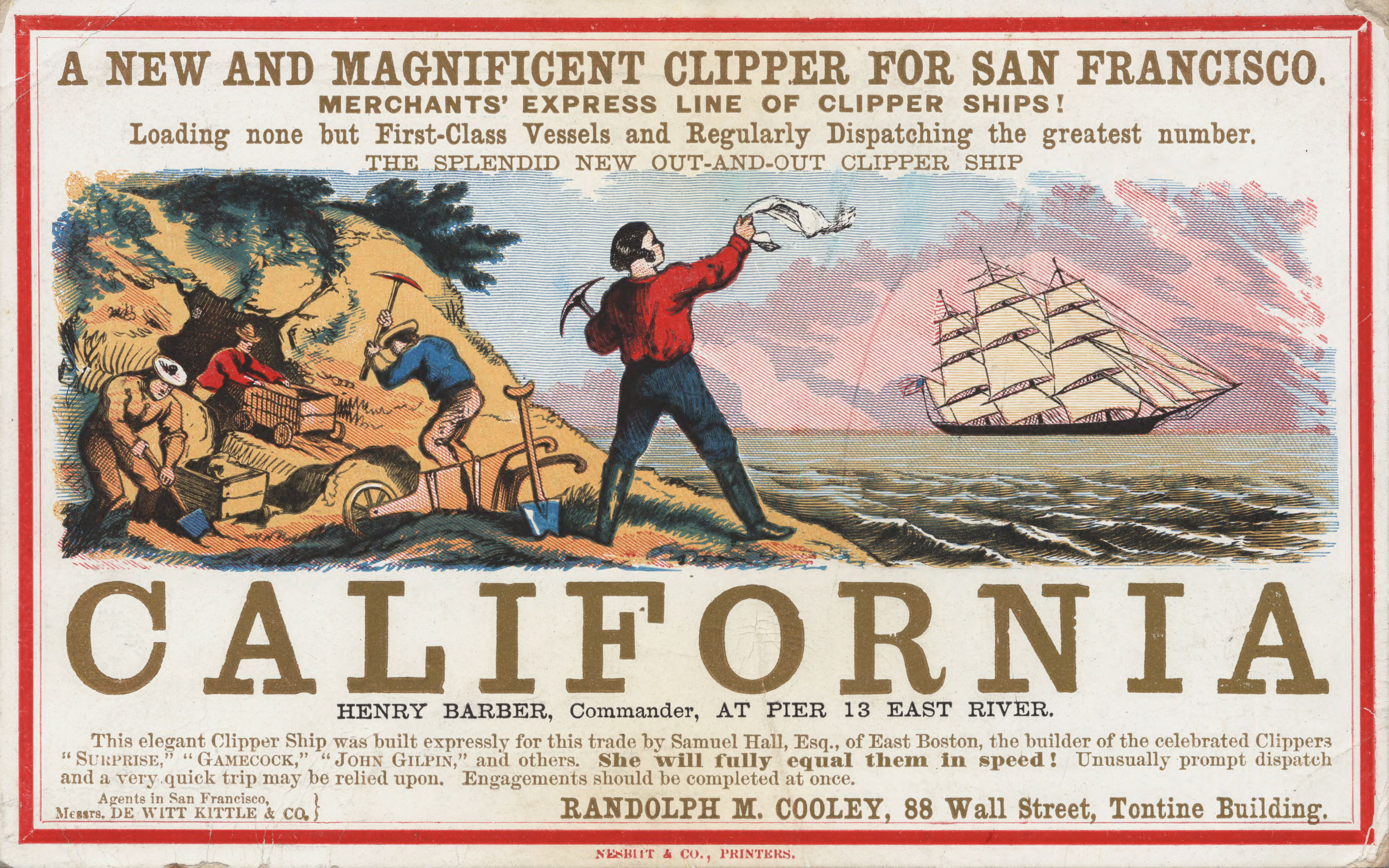
Advertisement for a California clipper, circa 1850

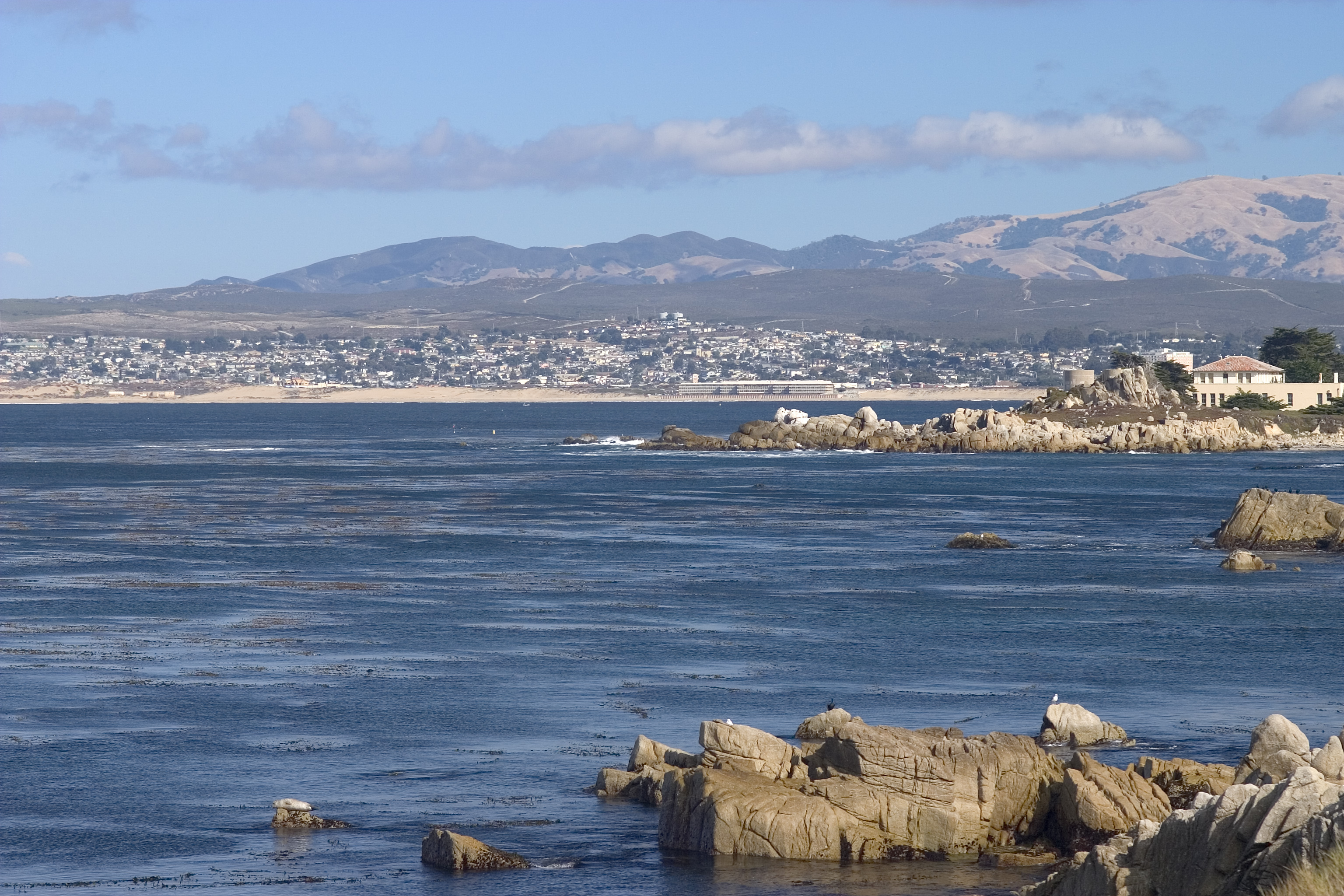
Monterey Bay

The maritime history of California can be divided into several periods: the Native American period; European exploration period from 1542 to 1769; the Spanish colonial period, 1769 to 1821; the Mexican period, 1821 to 1847; and United States statehood period, which continues to the present day. In the history of the California coast, the use of ships and the Pacific Ocean has historically included water craft (such as dugouts, canoes, sailing ships, and steamships), fisheries, shipbuilding, Gold Rush shipping, ports, shipwrecks, naval ships and installations, and lighthouses.

== Native California maritime peoples ==
=== Dugout canoes ===
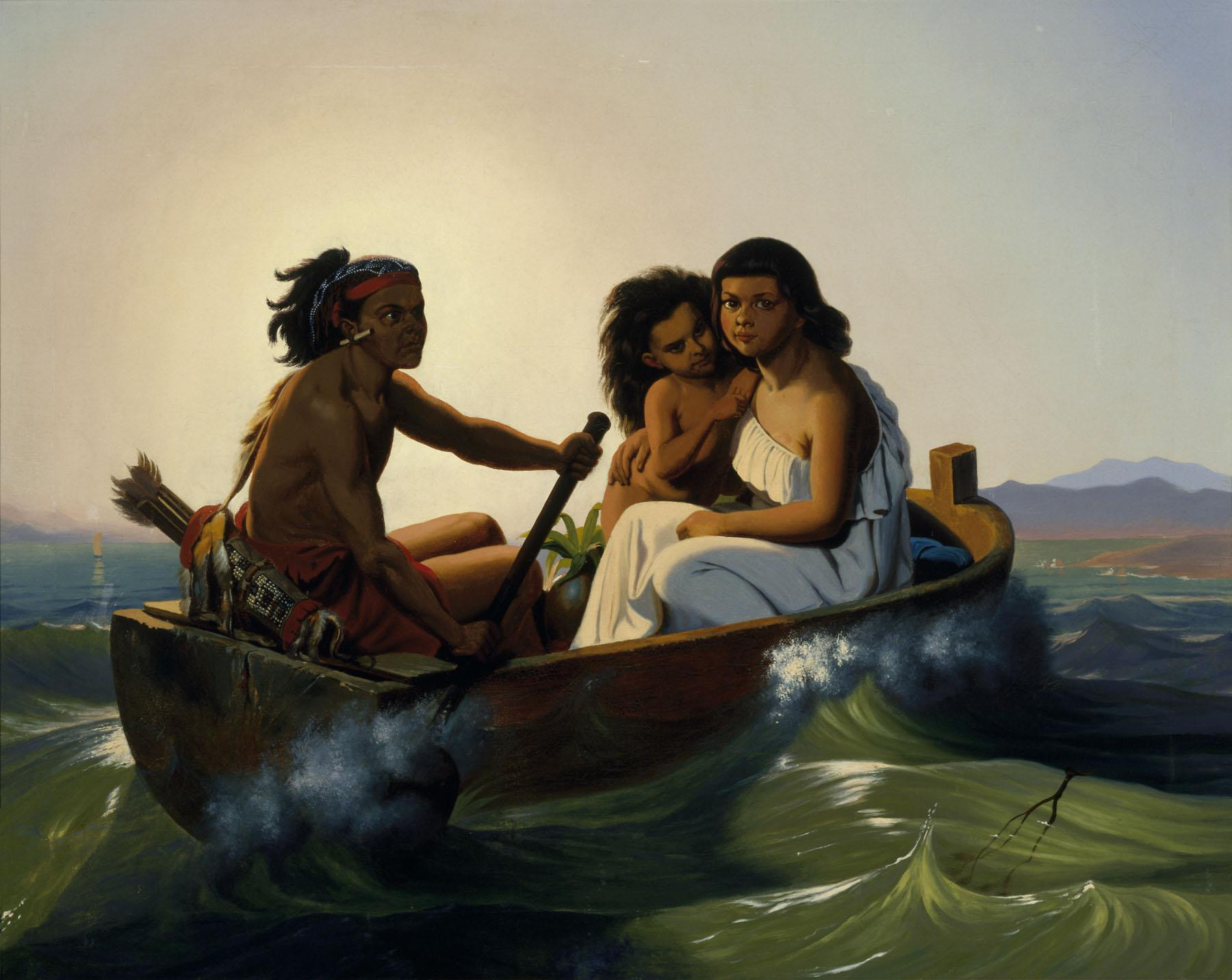
Depiction of an Ohlone family in a dugout canoe on the San Francisco Bay. (c. 1870's; Charles Christian Nahl).

In the northwest coast of California near the redwood forests several Indian tribes developed large dugout canoes they used for fishing, trade and warfare. These canoes were constructed by taking a large tree and shaping it with hand tools and fire to a boat's configuration. A redwood log 4 metres (13 ft) long and 240 centimetres (94 in) diameter weighs about 2,000 kilograms (4,400 lb). This large weight meant that the logs were selected that required a minimum of movement—usually driftwood or dead fall trees that had been blown over by the wind. Sometimes logs were cut to length and rolled into water where they could be floated to a selected work area. The logs were usually cut to length by fire and Stone Age hand tools and the interior of the canoe was typically burned out with small fires. The basic procedure was to start a small fire on the tree where it needed shaping, then extinguish it after a short burn. This would leave one or more centimeters of charred wood where the fire was built that would be easier to remove.

By successively using small fires to char the areas that needed to be worked the logs could be shaped by the crude scrapers and rock, shellfish and horn based tools available. A finished 4 metres (13 ft) long dugout canoe with a nominal 5 centimetres (2.0 in) thickness still weighed over 100 kilograms (220 lb). Most larger dugouts weighed too much to move easily and were usually just pulled up on a beach far enough to get them above high tide. Constructing these types of dugout canoes took considerable time and skill with Stone Age tools and fire. Dugout canoes typically lasted several years.

=== Tule boats (canoes) ===
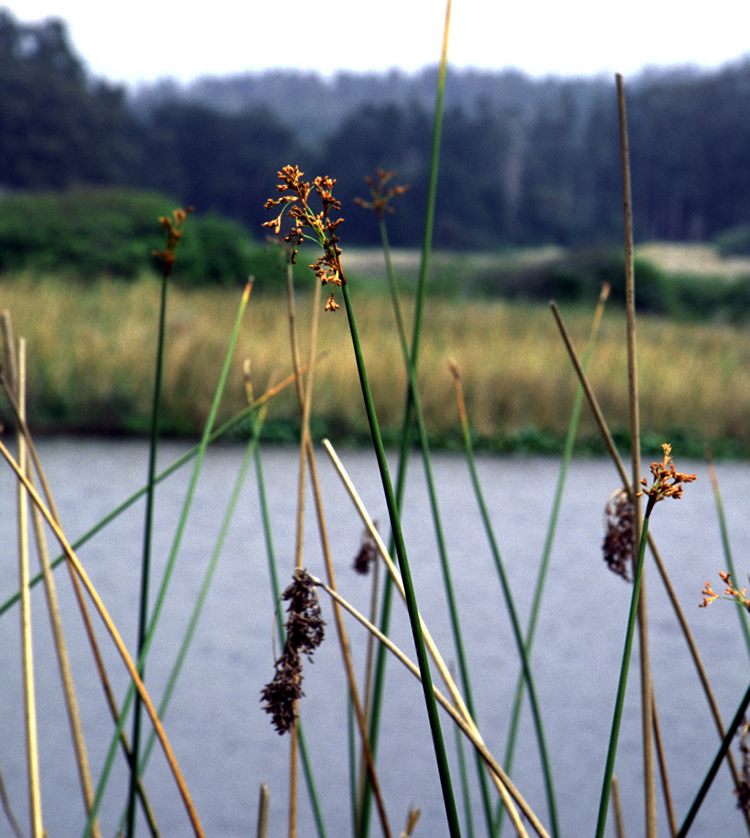
Tule reeds growing wild near water

Tule (Schoenoplectus acutus also called bulrushes), a type of sedges, have a thin (~1 cm or 0.5 inch) diameter, rounded green stems that grows to 1 to 3 metres (3–10 ft) tall. They grow well in marshes, wetlands or at the edges of bodies of water. The tule stem has a pithy interior filled with spongy tissue packed with air cells—this makes it float well on water as well as a good insulator. Native Americans used tule for making and thatching huts, baskets, mats, boats, decoys, hats, clothing and shoes. Tule was typically cut using deer scapula 'saws' that had rough saw like edges cut into them. Tule has to be handled with care when green to avoid breaking the stem and gains strength when it is partially dried.

To make a tule boat, green tule was cut and then spread out in the sun to dry for several days. Tule canoes were constructed of cut stalks of tule plants bundled together around a willow 'core' for extra strength. The bundle of tules could be pre-bent as they were being bundled to form a raised prow and stern. The length of each bundle depends on the size of the boat that were then typically about 10 feet (3.0 m) to 15 feet (4.6 m). The bundle that formed the bottom of the canoe on which the boatman or boatmen sat, knelt or stood was much larger than the others. To make the sides of the tule canoe two to six tapered bundles were tied to the bottom bundle with grape vines or other native material with extensive lacing at the stern and prow to bend all the tule bundles into a tapered and raised bow and stern. Tule canoes typically accommodated one to four people. Tule boats can be quickly built from dried tule, by experienced canoe builders, in less than one day. Tule boats have a limited useful life before they rot and/or come apart—typically only lasting a few weeks.

Several tribes in and around the San Francisco Bay area and in northern California made and used tule canoes (also called balsas). Bay Miwok, Coast Miwok, Ohlone (Costanoan), Pomo, Klamath, Modoc and several other indigenous natives used the tule plant to make canoes. Tule canoes were used in ocean lagoons from Tomales Bay and Point Reyes National Seashore south to perhaps Monterey Bay. Tule–reed boats were used in lakes, bays and slow-moving rivers in much of Northern California. They were used by the Pomo living in the Laguna de Santa Rosa and Clear Lake, Tule Lake and other areas. They were common in the San Francisco Bay and on the extensive Sacramento–San Joaquin River Delta and its tributary rivers.

These tule canoes were used for transportation to and from their favorite spots for hunting or harvesting salmon, acorns, seeds, berries, shellfish or oysters and other fish or foods. Extensive beds and shoals of oysters (Ostrea lurida) and other shellfish then lay in shallow water near the shores of San Francisco Bay and Tomales Bay and were a food source used for centuries. Tule canoes were also used for gathering more tule reeds and for hunting duck or geese which were then often present in the wetlands, etc. in the millions. Tule canoes were used in collecting aquatic food plants and duck and goose eggs. Ducks and geese were often hunted from tule canoes with arrows or nets. Tule canoes were used in fishing with nets, spears or bone fish hooks for several native fish species present in or migrating through the rivers, ocean and bays.

The boatman typically sits, kneels or stands in the boat and either paddles it with a double bladed paddle or with his arms in a single person canoe when lying prone. If the boat was not woven tightly enough, then the boatman would find himself sitting, standing or kneeling in several inches of water. The tule canoes were often used for transportation to oyster mollusk and other shellfish beds that could be harvested at low tide. The Emeryville Shellmound or midden composed almost entirely of the inedible shells of different types of shellfish, presumably harvested utilizing tule boats, is an example of the over 400 shell mounds known in the San Francisco Bay area. These often massive shell mounds (the Emeryville Shellmound was originally reported as being 60 feet (18 m) high by 350 feet (110 m) long), were often built up over centuries of shell discards and showed a stable source of easily obtained shellfish utilized for many hundreds of years. It is believed that shellfish was a major if not the main source of food for many Native American people.

To see pictures of tule canoes use the image option of Google, Bing, etc. and type in "Tule canoe" and search--several images are usually found that may be clicked on for more information. Local conservation groups often have courses in building tule canoes.

=== Sewn plank (Tomol) canoes ===
An ancient maritime culture dating back some 8,000 years, perhaps earlier, has been documented by dating of middens on San Clemente Island, some 60 miles offshore Southern California. Native California peoples lived in large settled villages along the Pacific coastline and on the Channel Islands for thousands of years before European contact.

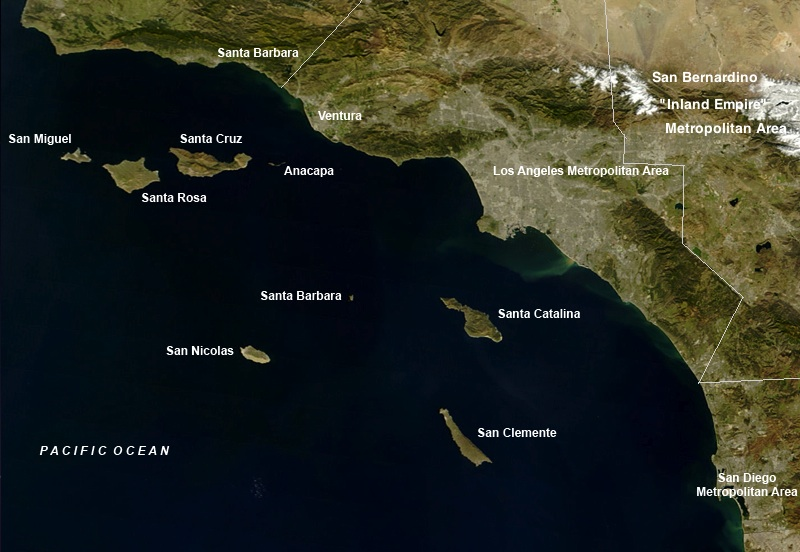
The California Channel Islands

In some areas such as along the Santa Barbara Channel separating the Channel Islands from the coast, the Chumash and Tongva people developed highly sophisticated canoes. These canoes were used in fishing and in widespread trade between different villages on and off the Channel Islands. Boat construction reached its highest development in California among the Chumash and Tongva people. Their sewn plank canoes, called a "tomol", impressed early explorers of the coast for its versatility, seaworthiness and size.

The canoes were typically made out of planks split from redwood (Sequoioideae) or pine driftwood washed up on the shore. This driftwood was usually chosen because it was available and usually knot free and easy to work with. Some of these driftwood logs were selected, cut to length, split, shaped and then their split out planks "sewn" together to form a canoe. The side planks and canoe bottom were split out of straight knot free logs utilizing whalebone and antler Wedges driven by rock mallets. The planks were then shaped, trimmed and leveled using flint and seashell tools and shark hide sandpaper. Where planks needed to be connected holes were bored in the planks using wood drills tipped with chert or bone. These drilled planks were then connected by "sewing" split and shaped knot free planks together on their ends to get the necessary length. They were typically fastened together with red milkweed (tok) fiber cords. After the planks had been shaped and sewn together for length they were carefully shaped, bent and mounted six to eight planks vertically to form the canoe's sides around a large split bottom plank that formed the bottom of the canoe. Over 20 pieces of shaped wood are used to make a typical tomol. Once the planks were bent, fitted and lashed together the heart of dry tule rush was forced into the cracks between the planks on the outside of the canoe hull to act as caulking. All seams between planks, plank ends and holes for cords or thongs were then caulked with 'yop', a mixture of hard tar and pine pitch melted and then boiled. In many respects their boat construction technique mirrored that utilized for making small wooden boats around the world. The lack of metal tools and fasteners forced them to use Stone Age tools and materials.

These canoes were built to carry from 3 to 10 people, one of which was usually assigned to bail, and the rest propelled the canoe by using rough oars. The typical tomol was 12 feet (3.7 m) to 24 feet (7.3 m) long with a beam of 3 feet (0.91 m) to 5 feet (1.5 m). Sea voyages of over 130 miles (210 km) have been recorded for these craft. They fished the sea with fishing nets, harpoons, spears and bone fish hooks. One of their common net catches were sardines and larger sardines called pilchards—then common in large schools off the coast. The Chumash had settlements on the coast and on the northern Channel Islands. The Tongva (Gabrielino-Tongva Tribe) had several small settlements on the southern Channel Islands as well as villages on the southwest coast of California.

Chumash and Tongva trading expeditions between the mainland and the Channel Islands were common. Most were to obtain steatite for soapstone bowls and effigy figurines. The remains of this prehistoric seafaring is being investigated by underwater archaeologists. At least 25 individual sites have been reported between Point Hueneme and Point Conception.

== Early European explorers ==
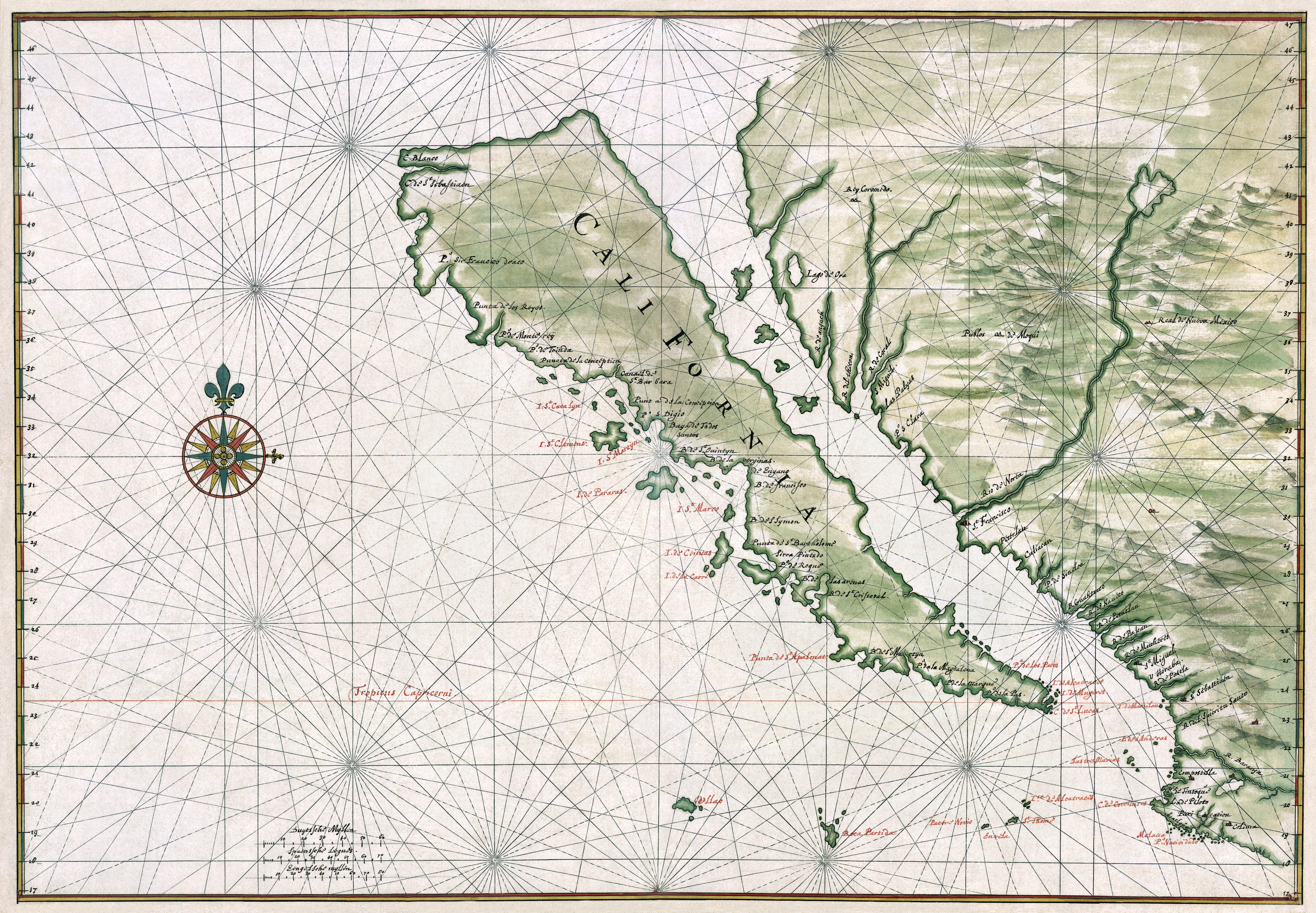
The "island" of California, from a map circa 1650. Restored. Ulloa's discoveries of 1539 were apparently still secret.

In 1539, Francisco de Ulloa under commission from the Viceroyalty of New Spain and New Spain (Mexico) conqueror, Hernán Cortés, explored the Gulf of California to the Colorado River—establishing Baja California as a peninsula. Ulloa then went 800 miles (1,300 km) south down the Baja California peninsula in the Gulf of California and rounding the tip of the peninsula turned north and explored the west coast of the Baja peninsula—perhaps to the 28th parallel (near the Isla Natividad). Ulloa's sailing ships battered by adverse winds and his men wracked by scurvy, returned to New Spain (Mexico) without exploring further.

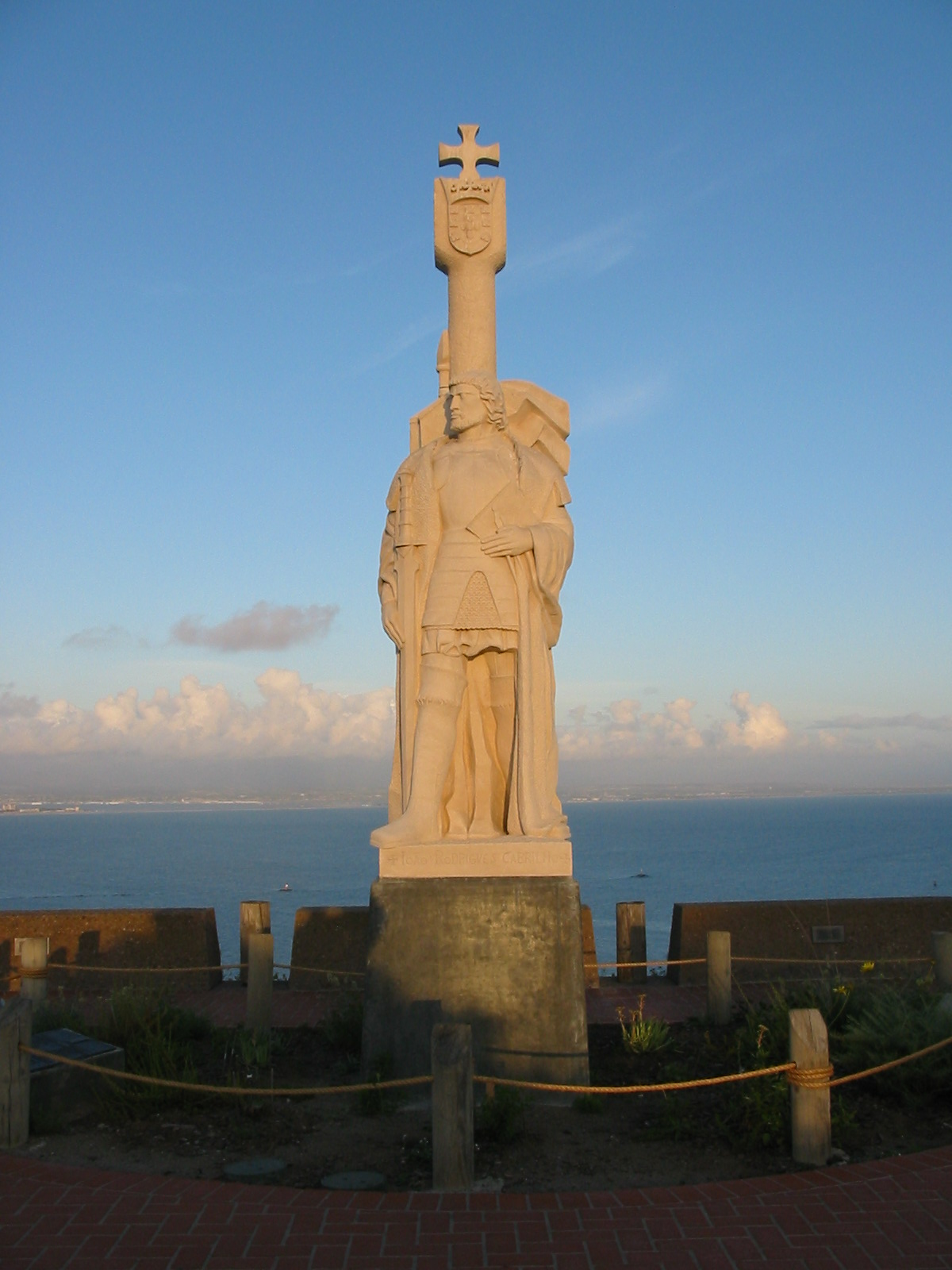
Cabrillo National Monument in San Diego, California.

The first European expedition to explore the upper California coast was led by the explorer and conquistador Juan Rodríguez Cabrillo (c. 1499–1543). Cabrillo shipped for Havana as a young man and joined forces with Hernán Cortés in New Spain in about 1520 as a conquistador crossbow man. In the conquest of the Aztec capital of Tenochtitlan (Mexico City) in 1521 Cortez directed Cabrillo to build thirteen 40 feet (12 m) boats to fight on the lake then in the center of Tenochitlan. Rapidly advancing in rank under Cortez's direction he participated in the conquest of El Salvador and Guatemala and was rewarded by being granted an extensive Encomienda (a feudal grant of land including the occupants on it) controlling vast land and Native American resources in Guatemala. His success in guiding the Native Americans on his Encomienda in mining gold in Guatemala, made him one of the richest of the conquistadors in Mexico and Guatemala. Sponsored by Pedro de Alvarado, the Guatemala governor, Cabrillo's directed the building of several small sailing ships in Guatemala—the first on the Pacific coast. After Alvarado's death in 1541 the new Viceroy of New Spain, Antonio de Mendoza took over control of the shipyards and directed Cabrillo to build three ships and lead an expedition further up the Pacific Coast in search of more rich Native American civilizations like the Aztec and Incas. They were also to see if there was a shorter way to China—the mythical Strait of Anián (or Northwest Passage) connecting the Pacific Ocean with the Atlantic Ocean.

To build the ships the anchors, sails, shipbuilding tools and metal fittings were imported from Spain and then ported by mule and Native American porters across Mexico and then south to Guatemala. Cabrillo, a former shipbuilder, with his Spanish assistants and Native American workers had the necessary lumber sawed out and assembled to make the first sailing ships built on the America's Pacific coast—in Guatemala. The ships finished lumber and timbers was sawed out of trees with "new" steel saws manned by Native American laborers under the direction of a few Spanish shipbuilders. The ships built for exploring the Pacific were small open caravels and bergantina built and manned by a mixture of Native Americans and Spanish sailors and conquistadors.

The last sailing ships built under Cabrillo's direction were the California exploration fleet: caravels, San Salvador (about 100 feet (30 m) long) and the smaller Victoria, and a bergantina (small sail boat or launch), San Miguel. Cabrillo captained the San Salvador and Bartolomé Ferrer the Victoria. These vessels were the first European sailing ships to visit the future state of California.

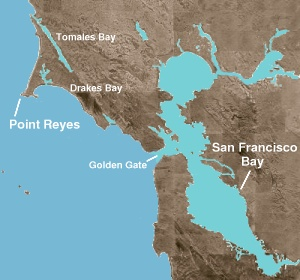
Point Reyes California

After the California exploration ships were built, Cabrillo and his mixed crews of conquistadors, Spanish and untrained Native American sailors totaling about 200 men, carefully made their way north from Navidad, Mexico up the Pacific coast starting on 17 June 1542. They took enough supplies to last about two years. The combination of the south flowing California Current and often opposing winds made progress north up the coast agonizingly slow. The small, rudely made open boats with only partially trained crews caused the crews to suffer miserably in the storms they encountered on their way. After landing several times on the Baja California coast for water, wood and whatever supplies they could scrounge they finally, after traveling one hundred and three days, entered San Diego Bay on 28 September 1542. They continued north up the California coast encountering many Indian villages using Native American "tomols" (ocean-going stitched canoes). The continued north up the coast possibly as far as Point Reyes California.

On 23 November 1542, the little fleet limped back down the coast to "San Salvador" (identified as today's Santa Catalina Island, California or Santa Rosa Island) to overwinter and make repairs. There, around Christmas Eve 1542, Cabrillo stepped out of his boat and splintered his shin when he stumbled on a jagged rock. The injury developed gangrene and he died on 3 January 1543 and was buried in an unknown location. His second-in-command, Bartolomé Ferrer, brought the remainder of the party back to Barra de Navidad, Mexico where they arrived 14 April 1543. They had found no gold or silver wealth, no advanced Indian civilization, no agriculture and no Northwest passage. As a result, California was of little further interest to the Spanish who would basically ignore it for over 220 years.

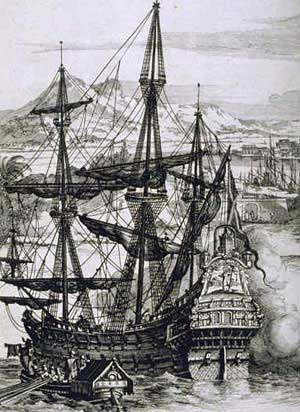
Spanish Galleon

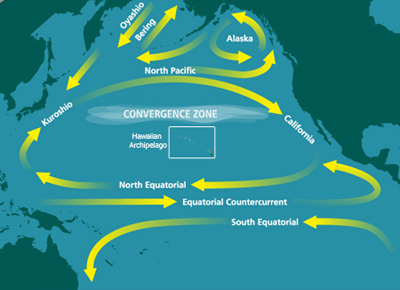
Trade winds used by the Manila galleons to get to and from Guam and the Philippines--the North Pacific Gyre

In 1565 the Spanish developed a Manila galleon trade route (also called "nao de la China") where they took silver minted in the Potosí area of Peru or in Mexico and traded it for gold, silk, porcelain, spices and other goods from China and other Asian areas including the Spice Islands. There was a great demand for silver in China. They also traded for gold objects which could be gotten in China in this time period at a silver:gold exchange rate of about 5:1 whereas the rate in Europe was about 16:1. The Spanish centered their trade in the Philippines at first around Cebu, which they had recently conquered, and later in Manila after they conquered it. The trade between the Philippines and Mexico involved using an annual round trip passage of one or more Manila galleons. These poorly defended galleons left Acapulco Mexico loaded with silver and sailed to the Philippines in about 90 days following what's called now the north equatorial current and trade winds.

The higher-latitude Westerlies trade winds and current from east to west at about 30-40 degrees latitude, was not known as a way across the Pacific Ocean until Andrés de Urdaneta's voyage in the 40 ton San Lucas in 1565. Returning to Mexico from the Philippines the Manila Galleons went north to about 40 degrees latitude and then turning East they could use the Westerlies trade winds and currents to go east. They were loaded with a years worth of Oriental trade goods accumulated in the Philippines. These galleons, after crossing most of the Pacific Ocean, would arrive off the California coast from four to seven months later somewhere near Cape Mendocino (about 300 miles (480 km) north of San Francisco) at about 40 degrees N. latitude. They then could turn right and sail south down the California coast utilizing the available winds and the south flowing (≈1 mi/hr (1.6 km/h)) California Current. The maps and charts were poor and the California coast was often shrouded in fog, so most journeys were well off shore to avoid the Farallon and California Channel Islands. After sailing about 1,500 miles (2,400 km) south and passing the Baja Peninsula tip and crossing the Gulf of California they followed the western coast of Mexico to Acapulco, Mexico. Acapulco was chosen as a home port because of its excellent harbor facilities and its easy access to the city of Veracruz, Mexico on the Caribbean.

These galleons were some the largest the Spanish built in the 16th and 17th centuries. Because of the limited number of ships and the highly profitable cargo they increased ship size up to 1,700 to 2,000 tons and from seven hundred to over one thousand people would take passage back to Acapulco on these vessels. The Manila galleon trade (See: Spanish treasure fleet) was one of the most persistent, perilous, and profitable commercial enterprises in European colonial history. This highly profitable trade (profits could reach 200-300%) with an almost annual trip by one to two ships to the Philippines and back down the California coast was continued for over 200 years. The number of ships was limited by the Spanish Crown which got 20% of all profits. Because of the high profit and royal taxes smuggling was rampant on these ships. Because of the harsh trip and high profits most officers and crews only made one trip before finding something else to do. The ships were mostly built in the Philippines using Filipino laborers to saw out the timber, weave the sails, etc. with Chinese craftsman and blacksmiths doing the ship assembly under the direction of Spanish shipbuilders.

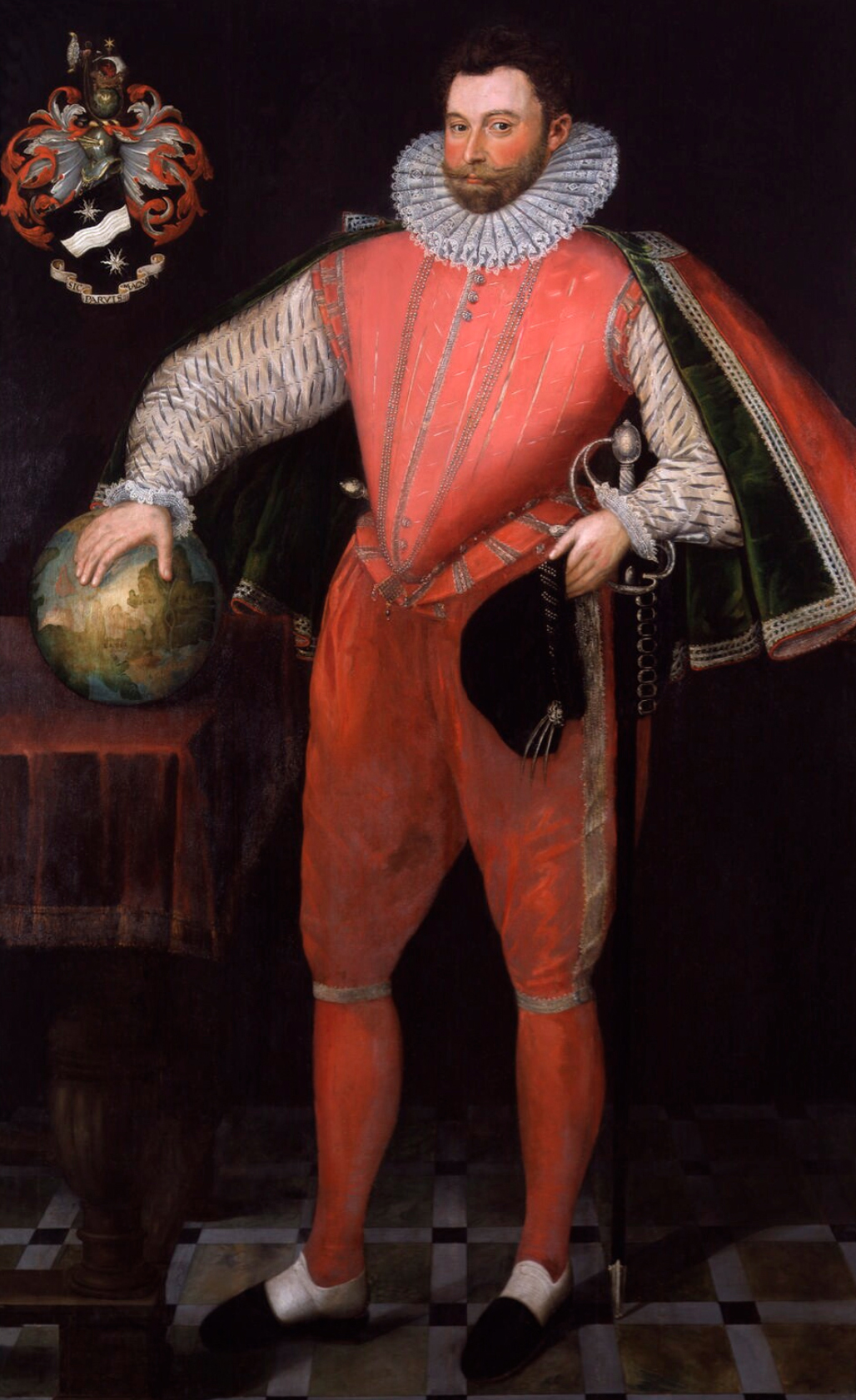
Sir Francis Drake, circa 1581

The English explorer and privateer Francis Drake sailed along the coast of California in 1579 after capturing two Spanish treasure ships headed for the Philippines in the Pacific. It is believed that he landed somewhere on the California coast. There his only surviving ship, the Golden Hind, set up friendly relations with the local Indians and underwent extensive repairs and cleaning of his hull. Needed supplies of food, water and wood were accumulated by trade and foraging for a trip across the Pacific. Leaving California he followed Ferdinand Magellan on the second recorded circumnavigation of the world and the first English circumnavigation of the world, being gone from 1577 to 1580. He returned with several tons of silver and gold. Drake's landing at New Albion in Drakes Bay is recognized by the Drakes Bay National Historic and Archeological District National Historic Landmark. He claimed the land for England, calling it Nova Albion. The term "Nova Albion" was often used on many European maps to designate territory north of the Spanish Pacific coast settlements. Spanish maps, explorations etc., of this and later eras were generally not published, being regarded as state secrets by the Spanish monarchy. As was typical in this era, there were conflicting claims to the same territory, and the Indians who lived there were never consulted.

After Thomas Cavendish successfully raided the Manila galleon Santa Ana off the tip of Baja California in 1587 an attempt was made to explore the coast for a possible town site in California for replenishing and protecting the Manila galleons. Exploration by these Manila galleons met with disaster when the Manila galleon San Agustin got too close to the Point Reyes, California coast in a storm in 1595 and was shipwrecked. Subsequently, the Spanish crown decreed that no further exploration or colonization attempts in California would be made with Manila galleons; a years worth of profit from the Philippines could not be risked. One of the greatest bays on the west coast—San Francisco Bay—escaped outside-the-area knowledge until sited on 4 November 1769.

In 1602, 60 years after Cabrillo, the Spaniard Sebastián Vizcaíno, who had been on the Santa Ana when it was captured by Thomas Cavendish off Cape San Lucas on the Baja peninsula in 1587, explored California's coastline from San Diego as far north as Monterey Bay. He was looking for a possible town site for replenishing and protecting the annual trip of the Manila Galleon. Vizcaíno named San Diego Bay and held the first Christian church service recorded in California on the shores of San Diego Bay. He also put ashore in Monterey, California, and made glowing reports of the Monterey Bay area as a possible anchorage for ships with land suitable for growing crops—the California coastal Indians had no agriculture. He also provided rudimentary charts of the coastal waters, which were used by the Spanish for nearly 200 years.

== Spanish California maritime activities ==
A potential colonial power interested in Alta California was Russia, already established in the Pacific Ocean in Alaska. Their Maritime Fur Trade originally focused in Alaska started making expeditions to the California for harvesting sea otters and fur seals. These furs could be traded in China for large profits. After the conclusion of the Seven Year War between Britain and France and their allies (in U.S. called the French and Indian War) (1754–1763) France was driven out of North America, Spain, Russia and Britain were the only colonial powers left in North America.

To prevent Russia or Britain from establishing settlements in California in 1769, the Spanish Visitor General, José de Gálvez, under directions of the Spanish Crown, proceeded to plan a five part expedition to settle Alta California. Three ships with supplies and men were to go by sea and two expedition by land to start settling Alta California. Gaspar de Portolà volunteered to command the expedition. The Catholic Church was represented by Franciscan friar Junípero Serra and his fellow friars. All five detachments of soldiers, friars and colonists were to meet at the site of San Diego Bay. The first sailing ship, the San Carlos, sailed from La Paz on 10 January 1769, and the ship San Antonio sailed on 15 February. The first land party, led by Fernando Rivera y Moncada, left from the Franciscan Mission San Fernando Velicata on 24 March 1769. The third vessel, the sailing ship San José, left New Spain later that spring but was lost at sea with no survivors. With Rivera was Father Juan Crespí, famed diarist of the entire expedition. The expedition led by Portolà, which included Father Junípero Serra, the President of the Missions, along with a combination of missionaries, settlers, and leather-jacket (leather jackets made of several layers of leather could stop most Indian arrows) soldiers, including José Raimundo Carrillo, left Velicata on 15 May 1769, accompanied by about 46 mules, 200 cows and 140 horses—all that could be spared by the poor Baja Missions. Fernando Rivera was appointed to command the lead party that would scout out a land route and blaze a trail to San Diego. Food was short, and the Indians accompanying them were expected to forage for most of what they needed. Many Indian neophytes died along the way—even more deserted. On 15 May 1769, the day after Rivera and Crespí reached San Diego Portolà and Serra set out from Velicata. The two groups traveling from Lower California on foot had to cross about 300 miles (480 km) of the very dry and rugged Baja California peninsula. The overland part of the expedition took about 40–51 days to get to San Diego. All five detachments were to meet at San Diego Bay.

The contingent coming by sea, encountered the south flowing California Current and strong head winds and were still straggling in three months after they set sail. After their arduous journeys, most of the men aboard the ships were ill, chiefly from scurvy, and many had died. Out of a total of about 219 men who had left Baja California, little more than 100 now survived. The Spanish settlements of Alta California were the last expansion of Spain's vastly over-extended empire in North America, and they tried to do it with minimal cost and support.

A few leather jacket soldiers and Franciscan friars financed by the Catholic Church and Spanish Crown would form the backbone of the proposed settlement of Alta California. The settlements eventually included: twenty one surviving Missions—typically manned by two to three friars and five to ten soldiers; four military Presidios were built—manned by 10 to 100 soldiers and four small settlements (Pueblos) were set up to grow food for the Presidios.

On 14 July 1769, an expedition was dispatched to find the port of Monterey, California. Not recognizing the Monterey Bay from the description written by Sebastián Vizcaíno almost 200 years prior, the expedition traveled beyond it to what was called San Francisco area. The exploration party, led by Don Gaspar de Portolà arrived on 2 November 1769, at San Francisco Bay. One of the greatest ports on the west coast of America had finally become known to non-indigenous people. The expedition finally returned to San Diego on 24 January 1770 weak with hunger and suffering from scurvy.

Without any agricultural crops or experience eating the food on which the Indians subsisted (ground acorns), the shortage of food at San Diego became extremely critical during the first few months of 1770. They subsisted on some of their cattle (Texas Longhorns), wild geese, fish, and other food exchanged with the Indians for clothing, but the ravages of scurvy continued for there was restricted amounts of food and no understanding of the cause or cure of scurvy then. A small quantity of corn they had planted grew well—only to be eaten by birds. Portolá sent Captain Rivera and a small detachment of about 40 men to the Baja California missions in February to obtain more cattle and a pack-train of supplies. This temporarily eased the drain on San Diego's scant provisions, but within weeks, acute hunger and increased sickness again threatened to force abandonment of the port. Portolá resolved that if no relief ship arrived by 19 March 1770 they would leave the next morning "because there were not enough provisions to wait longer and the men had not come to perish from hunger." At three o'clock in the afternoon on 19 March 1770, as if by a miracle, the sails of the sailing ship San Antonio loaded with relief supplies were discernible on the horizon. The settlement of Alta California would continue.

Late in 1775 Juan Bautista de Anza led a contingent of 240 soldiers, settlers and friars from Sonora Mexico over the Gila River Trail over the Colorado River at the Yuma Crossing and up about 500 miles (800 km) of Alta California to the San Francisco Bay area where they arrived 28 March 1776. There the Spanish built the Mission San Francisco de Asís, (or Mission Dolores), the Presidio of San Francisco and Yerba Buena, California (San Francisco). They came with about 200 leather-jacketed soldiers, and settlers with their families and two Franciscan friars. They brought with them about 600 horses and mules, 300 Texas Longhorn bulls and cows. These animals and their descendants were the core of the later cattle and horse herds on the Californio Ranchos. These soldiers, friars, settlers and livestock came over the Anza Trail from Sonora, Mexico, four years before the trail from New Spain to California was closed for over 40 years by the Quechan people (Yumas)—most new emigrants would have to come by ship.

In 1780 the Spanish established two combination missions and pueblos at the Yuma Crossing of the Colorado River: Mission San Pedro y San Pablo de Bicuñer and Mission Puerto de Purísima Concepción. July 1781 the Yuma (Quechan) Indians, in a dispute with the Spanish destroyed both missions and pueblos—killing 103 soldiers, colonists and Franciscan friars and capturing about 80—mostly women and children. Despite four expeditions to reassert Spanish control the Yuma Crossing remained under the Quechans' control for the next 40 years—the easiest land route to California was closed. This restriction caused most settler traffic and supplies to Alta California to come on a 30- to 60-day sailing ship journey form New Spain's towns on the Pacific Ocean. Because there were only a few settlers and they had essentially nothing to export or trade so there were only a few ships that came to Alta California. Combined with the Spanish restriction that prohibited non-Spanish shipping the average number of ships going to Alta California from 1770 to 1821 was 2.5 ship/year with 13 years showing no recorded ships.

On 20 November 1818 Hippolyte de Bouchard raided the Presidio of Monterey in Monterey, California. Bouchard, a French revolutionary who later became a citizen of Argentina, is sometimes referred to as California's only pirate, although some Argentines prefer to use the term corsair.

Since much of his crew died from scurvy, Bouchard went in search of new crew members in the Sandwich Islands (now Hawaii), and then sailed to the coast near Mission Santa Barbara and threatened the nearby town. Bouchard and his crew left without attacking after some soldiers from the Presidio of Santa Barbara confronted them, and arranged a prisoner exchange.

On 14 December 1818, Bouchard attacked Mission San Juan Capistrano and he and his crew damaged several buildings, including the Governor's house, the King's stores, and the barracks.

In the first decades of the 19th century the Russian-American Company (RAC) operating out of Sitka, Alaska, began to bring Aleut hunters and their kayaks and baidarkas to the coast of Spanish California to poach sea otters. Usually US maritime fur trading ships were hired by the RAC for this purpose. The first known example was the 1803–1804 voyage of the US ship O'Cain, under Joseph O'Cain. Sometimes the RAC purchased US ships and used them for this purpose. For example, the US ship Lydia was sold to the RAC in 1813 and renamed Il'mena. This vessel spent much of the 1810s involved in sea otter hunting on the coast of California. Today Il'mena is best known for its role in the 1814 massacre of the Nicoleño natives of San Nicolas Island, which ultimately resulted in one Nicoleño woman, known as Juana Maria, living alone on the island for many years. These events became the basis for Scott O'Dell's 1960 children's novel Island of the Blue Dolphins.

== Alta California maritime activities 1821–1846 ==
Even before Mexico gained independence and control of Alta California in 1821, the onerous Spanish rules against trading with foreigners began to break down as the declining Spanish fleet proved unable to enforce the foreign-trading ban. Alta California residents, with essentially no industries or manufacturing capabilities, were eager to trade for new commodities, glass, hinges, nails, finished goods, luxury goods and other merchandise. The Mexican government abolished the no-trade-with-foreign-ships policy and soon regular trading trips were being made. Alta California export products were produced on the large cattle ranches called ranchos; primarily cow hides (called California greenbacks), tallow (rendered fat for making candles and soap) and California/Texas longhorn cattle horns. These were traded for finished goods and merchandise. The hide-and-tallow trade was mainly carried on by Boston-based ships that traveled for about 200 days in sailing ships about 17,000 miles (27,000 km) to 18,000 miles (29,000 km) around Cape Horn to bring finished goods and merchandise to trade with the Californio Ranchos for their hides, tallow and horns. The cattle and horses that provided the hides, tallow and horns essentially grew wild on the open rangeland of the ranchos. The hides, tallow and horns provided the necessary trade articles for a mutually beneficial trade. The first United States, English, and Russian trading ships arrived in California before 1800. The classic book Two Years Before the Mast by Richard Henry Dana Jr. written about the period 1834–36, provides a good first-hand account of this trade.

From 1825 to 1848 the average number of ships traveling to California increased to about 25 ships per year—a large increase from the average of 2.5 ships per year from 1769 to 1824. The port of entry for trading purposes was the Alta California Capital, Monterey, California, where customs duties (tariffs) of about 100% were applied. These high duties gave rise to much bribery and smuggling, as avoiding the tariffs made more money for the ship owners and made the goods less costly to the customers. Essentially all the cost of the California government (what little there was) was paid for by these tariffs (customs duties). In this, they were much like the United States in 1850, where about 89% of the revenue of its federal government came from import tariffs (also called customs or ad valorem taxes), although at an average rate of about 20%.

By 1846, the province of Alta California had a non-native population of about 1,500 adult men along with about 6,500 women and children, who lived mostly in or near a string of settlements originally established near the coast by the Spanish. Estimates of immigrants vary from 600 to 2,000 by 1846 with more arriving each year.

== U.S. California naval activity ==
Before the American Revolution (1775–1783) the colonies that would become the United States had an already developed a strong seafaring tradition in the future New England and Mid-Atlantic states. The colonies with good access to British shipbuilding experience and technology and with good access to the Atlantic Ocean and extensive forests had already developed an advanced shipbuilding industry even before they gained independence. They were already building many of the ships used in the extensive British colonial trade as well as whaling and fishing vessels. Whaling recovered soon after the American Revolutionary War ended in 1783 and the United States whaling industry began to prosper. The whalers used bases primarily at Nantucket island and New Bedford, Massachusetts. About ten thousand United States' seamen manned whaling ships on whaling voyages that could last over two years. The United States grew to become the pre-eminent whaling nation in the world by the 1830s. From 1835 to 1860 the American whaling fleet averaged about 620 vessels annually with a shipping tonnage aggregating 190,500 tons. In this time period most of the whalers were whaling in the Pacific Ocean. From 1835 to 1860 the annual United States whale oil usage averaged 118,000 barrels of sperm oil, 216,000 barrels of other whale oil and 2,323,000 pounds of whalebone (baleen)—with a total average value of over $8,000,000 a year of 1830 dollars. The whale oil was used primarily in whale oil lamps for illumination at night and for some lubrication purposes. The baleen was used for corsets, brushes, whips, and other uses that required a strong flexible material—plastic hadn't been invented yet. Kerosene, when it was introduced in the early 1850s, was much cheaper and easily made by fractional distillation of petroleum. Kerosene started to rapidly replace whale oil for lighting in the 1850s. The Pacific Ocean whaling ships started getting fresh supplies, water and wood from California and the Sandwich Islands (Hawaii). Many whaling vessels preferred stopping in the San Francisco Bay Area before stopping to pay the high custom duties (also called tariffs and ad valorem taxes) at Monterey, California, wanted by the Californio government—avoiding taxes has a long history. By 1846 several hundred whaling ships per year were using Hawaii (then called the Sandwich Islands) as a temporary base.

Shortly after the United States gained independence in 1783 trade was instituted from East Coast ports with the West Coast to gather furs in the Maritime Fur Trade to trade with China for porcelain, silk, spices etc.. British Royal Navy commander George Vancouver sailed up the west coast past the mouth of the Columbia River and in April 1792 and observed a change in the water's color, which implied there may be a major river emptying into the Pacific. Later that month, Vancouver encountered the American captain Robert Gray at Grays Harbor—later named that in his honor. Gray also reported that he had seen the possible entrance to the Columbia a few years earlier and had spent nine days trying but failing to enter the river over its extensive sand bars and turbulent waves; but bad weather forced him to give up. Gray returned to the river mouth a second time in May 1792. This time he ordered a small sailboat launched to attempt to find a safe passage across the sand bars and turbulent waves by sounding (measuring the depth with a weight attached to a line of known length) the water depth to find a channel deep enough for his ship. Finally in the evening of 11 May 1792, Gray's men found a safe channel and he and his crew sailed their ship Columbia into the estuary of what he named the Columbia River after his ship. Once across the sand bars and turbulent water at the entrance to the river (later called the Columbia Bar) they sailed up the Columbia River several miles while exploring the river. Gray's find was a significant claim (besides the Lewis and Clark Expedition) put forth by the United States to claim possession of the Oregon Territory.

Beginning about 1790 United States ships often sailed along the West Coast to gather furs for trading with China. They traded steel knives, hatchets, blankets, kettles, whiskey, guns, powder, lead and other trade goods for furs collected by the natives. An attempt was made by the Spanish in Spanish California to severely restrict trade from San Diego to San Francisco. The land above San Francisco had no Spanish presence. The Russian-American Company was created in 1799 as a joint venture between Russian fur traders and United States ship merchants who agreed to purchase fur seal and sea otter furs obtained by the Russians. The Russian Czar was to get 20% of all profits. American ships brought food and other supplies to the Russian settlements, assisted in fur hunts, and took furs away. The company constructed settlements in what are today Alaska, Hawaii and California.

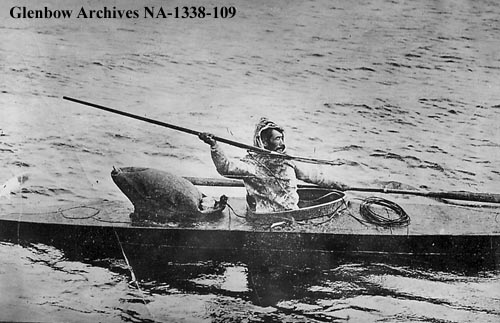
Aleut hunter with harpoon in Baidarka, Hudson Bay, circa 1908–1914

The Russian traders after visiting California in 1806 built Fort Ross, California in 1812 on the California coast in Sonoma County, California—just north of San Francisco. This was the southernmost outpost of the Russian-American Company. To keep unwanted Spanish intrusion away the Russians built a palisaded fort equipped with several cannons. Their objective in setting up Ft. Ross was to harvest fur seals and sea otters and grow grain and vegetables for the use of other Russian trading centers in Russian Alaska. The fur company at Fort Ross typically had a few score Russians with up to 75 Aleut who harvested (usually under some duress) the fur seals and sea otters from their kayaks on or near the Farallon Islands, the Channel Islands of California and in the ports and bays around San Francisco Bay. The Aleuts of Russian Alaska probably had the largest effect on the Channel islands and its people. These otter-hunters from the Aleutian Islands set up camps on the surrounding Channel Islands and traded with the native peoples in exchange for permission to hunt otters and seals around the island.

American fur trader John Jacob Astor built Fort Astoria on the Columbia River in 1811. Under pressure brought by the War of 1812 Astor sold the fort in 1813 to what would become The British Hudson's Bay Company. In 1830 Hudson Bay Co. built a new Fort Vancouver slightly up the Columbia River in the future Washington state. This fort was the main supply depot for Hudson Bay forts in all the Pacific Northwest. Within a few years they were growing quantities of wheat, constructed saw and flour mills, and yearly shipped lumber to the Hawaiian Islands and flour to Sitka, Alaska. They were resupplied every year by two to three ships that brought trading supplies around Cape Horn from England.

Sea otters and fur seals were severely depleted on the California coast and islands by the 1820s. Hudson's Bay Company entered the coast trade in the 1820s with the intention of driving the Americans away. This was accomplished by about 1840 just as the fur trade industry started dying due to lack of supply and a style change in felt hats—felt was made from fur and the main fur market. In its late period the maritime fur trade was largely conducted by the British Hudson's Bay Company and the Russian-American Company. The depleted supply of sea otters and the easy trade with the British in Fort Vancouver for food stuffs led the Russians to abandon Fort Ross in 1841 and sell the cannon and other supplies to John Sutter who was building up Sutter's Fort near Sacramento, California. The Hudson Bay Company departed from their trading post they had set up in Yerba Buena (San Francisco) in 1845 because of the declining fur trade and the death of their agent there.

The United States Exploring Expedition (1838–1842) was an exploring and surveying expedition of the Pacific Ocean ("the Southern Seas") conducted by the United States Navy to learn more about the Pacific Ocean and its ports. The expedition with five ships was authorized by Congress in 1836. It is sometimes called the "Ex. Ex." for short, or "the Wilkes Expedition" in honor of its next appointed commanding officer, U.S. Navy Lt. Charles Wilkes (1798–1877). The expedition was of major importance to the growth of oceanography and cartography of the Pacific. Two of these ships were lost from accidents—one on the Columbia River in 1841. From the area of modern-day Portland, Oregon, an overland party headed by George F. Emmons was directed to proceed via an inland route to San Francisco Bay. This Emmons party traveled south along the Siskiyou Trail, including the Sacramento River, making the first official recorded visit by Americans to and scientific note of Mount Shasta, in northern California. The Emmons party rejoined the ships, which had sailed south, in San Francisco Bay. After their return Wilkes published the major scientific works Western America, including California and Oregon (1849) and Theory of the Winds (1856).

The Pacific Squadron, established 1821, was part of the United States Navy squadron stationed in the Pacific Ocean in the 19th and early 20th centuries. Initially with no United States ports in the Pacific, they operated out of Naval storeships which provided naval supplies like powder and ammunition and purchased fresh supplies of food, wood and water from local ports of call in California, Hawaiian Islands (called the Sandwich Islands then) and ports and harbors on the Pacific Coast. The Pacific Squadron was instrumental in the capture of Alta California in the Mexican–American War of 1846 to 1848.

The five American navy sailing ships initially stationed in the Pacific had a force of 350-400 U.S. Marines and bluejacket U.S. Navy sailors on board available for deployment and were essentially the only significant United States military force on the Pacific coast in the early months of the Mexican–American War. The Marines were stationed aboard each warship to assist in close in ship to ship combat for either boarding or repelling boarders and could be detached for use on land. In addition there were some sailors on each ship that could be detached from each vessel for shore duty and still leave the ship functional though short handed. Naval gunnery officers typically handled the small cannons deployed as artillery with the sailors and marines.

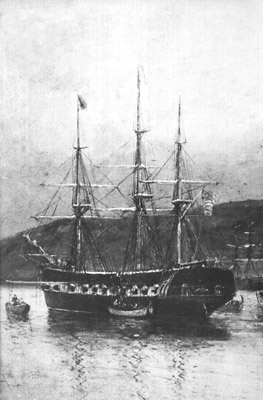
USS Cyane taking San Diego 1846.

Hostilities between U.S. and Mexican troops commenced on 25 April 1846 with Mexican troops killing and capturing a number of U.S. Army dragoons in the future state of Texas. The Battle of Palo Alto, the first major battle of the Mexican–American War, was fought on 8 May 1846, a few miles from the modern-day city of Brownsville, Texas. A force of some 3,400 Mexican troops (a portion of the Army of The North) led by Mexican General Mariano Arista engaged a force of 2,400 United States troops under General Zachary Taylor. Taylor's forces drove the Mexicans from the field. The United States Congress responded to these hostilities by issuing a declaration of war against Mexico on 13 May 1846 – the Mexican–American War had begun.

Speculating that war with Mexico over Texas and other land was very possible, the U.S. Navy had sent several additional naval vessels to the Pacific in 1845 to protect U.S. interests there. It took about 200 days, on average, for sailing ships to travel the greater than 17,000 miles (27,000 km) trip from the East coast around Cape Horn to California. Initially as the war with Mexico started there were five vessels in the U.S. Navy's Pacific Squadron near California. In 1846 and 1847, after war was declared, this force was increased to 13 Navy sailing ships—over half the U.S. Navy's available ships. This would be the last conflict the U.S. Navy fought with only sailing vessels as they rapidly converted to steam ships shortly after this conflict.

The former fleet surgeon William M. Wood and John Parrot, the American Consul of Mazatlán, arrived in Guadalajara Mexico on 10 May 1846. There they heard word of the ongoing hostilities between the U.S. and Mexico forces and sent a message by special courier back to Commodore Sloat then visiting Mazatlán. On 17 May 1846 this courier's messages informed Commodore Sloat that hostilities between the U.S. and Mexico had commenced. Commodore (Rear Admiral) John D. Sloat, commander of the U.S. Navy's Pacific Squadron and his fleet of four vessels were then at anchor in the harbor of Mazatlán. On hearing the news Commodore Sloat dispatched his flagship, the frigate Savannah (1842), and the Sloop Levant (1837) to Monterey harbor where they arrived on 2 July 1846. They joined the sloop Cyane (1837) which was already there. There were U.S. fears that the British might try to annex California to satisfy British creditors. The British Pacific Station's ships off California were stronger in ships, guns and men.

Hearing rumors of possible Californio military action against the newly arrived settlers in California (this had already happened in 1840), some settlers decided to neutralize the small Californio garrison at Sonoma, California. On 15 June 1846, some thirty settlers, mostly former American citizens, staged a revolt and seized the small Californio garrison in Sonoma without firing a shot. Initially there was little resistance from anyone in California as they replaced the dysfunctional and ineffective Mexican California government—which already had 40 Presidents in the first 24 years of its existence. Most settlers and Californios were neutral or actively supported the revolt. John A. Sutter and his men and supplies at Sutter's Fort joined the revolt. They raised the "Bear Flag" of the California Republic over Sonoma. The republic was in existence scarcely more than a week before the U.S. Army's John C. Frémont returned and took over on 23 June 1846 from William B. Ide the leader of the Bear Flag Revolt. The California state flag of today is based on this original Bear Flag and still contains the words "California Republic".

In 1846 the U.S. Navy was under orders to take over all California ports in the event of war. There were about 400–500 U.S. Marines and U.S. Navy bluejacket sailors available for possible land action on the Pacific Squadron's ships. Hearing word of the Bear Flag Revolt in Sonoma and the arrival of the large British 2,600 ton, 600-man, man-of-war HMS Collingwood, flagship under Sir George S. Seymour, outside Monterey Harbor, Commodore Sloat was finally stirred to action. On 7 July 1846—seven weeks after war had been declared, Commodore John D. Sloat instructed the Captains of the ships USS Savannah and sloops USS Cyane and USS Levant of the Pacific Squadron in Monterey Bay to occupy Monterey, California—the Alta California capital. Fifty American marines and about 100 bluejacket sailors landed and captured the city without incident—the few Californio troops formerly there having already evacuated the city. They raised the flag of the United States without firing a shot. The only shots fired were a 21 gun salute to the new 28 star U.S. flag fired by each of the U.S. Navy ships in the harbor. The British ships observed but took no action—getting a message to and from Britain requesting new orders to interfere would have taken from one to two years.

The abandoned Presidio and Mission San Francisco de Asís (Mission Dolores) at San Francisco, (then called Yerba Buena), was occupied without firing a shot on 9 July 1846 by U.S. Marines and U.S. Navy sailors from the sloop USS Portsmouth. Militia Captain Thomas Fallon led a small force of about 22 men from Santa Cruz, California, and captured the small town of Pueblo de San Jose without bloodshed on 11 July 1846. Fallon received an American flag from Commodore John D. Sloat, and raised it over the pueblo on 14 July. On 15 July 1846, Commodore (Rear Admiral) John D. Sloat transferred his command of the Pacific Squadron to Commodore Robert F. Stockton when Stockton's ship, the frigate Congress, arrived from Hawaii. Stockton, a much more aggressive leader, asked Fremont to form a joint force of Fremont's soldiers, scouts, guides etc. and a volunteer militia—many former Bear Flag Revolters. This unit called the California Battalion was mustered into U.S. service and were paid regular army wages. On 19 July, Frémont's newly formed "California Battalion" swelled to about 160 men. These men included Fremont's 30 topographical men and their 30 scouts and hunters, U.S. Marine Lieutenant Archibald H. Gillespie, a U.S. Navy officer to handle their two cannons, a company of Indians trained by Sutter and many other permanent California settlers from several different countries as well as American settlers. The California Battalion members were used mainly to garrison and keep order in the rapidly surrendering California towns. The Navy went down the coast from San Francisco, occupying ports without resistance as they went. The small pueblo (town) of San Diego surrendered 29 July 1846 without a shot being fired. The small pueblo of Santa Barbara surrendered without a shot being fired in August 1846. On 13 August 1846 a joint force of U.S. Marines, bluejacket sailors and parts of Fremont's California Battalion carried by the USS Cyane entered Los Angeles, California with flags flying and band playing. Captain Archibald H. Gillespie, (Fremont's second in command), with an inadequate force of 40 to 50 men were left to occupy and keep order in the largest town (about 3,500) in Alta California—Los Angeles.

On 11 July the British Royal Navy sloop HMS Juno enters San Francisco Bay causing Montgomery to man his defenses. The large British ship, 2,600 ton, man-of-war HMS Collingwood, flagship under Sir George S. Seymour, also shows up about this time outside Monterey Harbor. Both British ships observe, but did not enter the conflict.

Shortly after 9 July when it became clear the American Navy was taking action, the short-lived Bear Flag Republic was converted into a United States military conflict for possession of California and the Bear Flag (the basis for today's California flag) was replaced by the U.S. flag]. Fremont expeditionary forces joined forces with a volunteer force of California residents to form a small volunteer militia. The frigate USS Congress was the flagship of Commodore Robert F. Stockton when he took over as the senior United States military commander in California in late July 1846. Stockton asked Fremont to muster the troops and volunteers under his command into the California Battalion to help garrison the towns rapidly being captured from the Californios. Most towns surrendered without a shot being fired. Fremont's California Battalion members were sworn in and the volunteers paid the regular United States Army salary of $25.00 a month for privates with higher pay for officers. The California Battalion varied in size with time from about 160 initially to over 450 by January 1847. Pacific Squadron war ships and storeships served as floating store houses keeping Fremont's volunteer force in the California Battalion supplied with black powder, lead shot and supplies as well as transporting them to different California ports. The USS Cyane transported Fremont and about 160 of his men to the small port of San Diego which was captured on 29 July 1846 without a shot being fired.

A minor Californio revolt broke out in Los Angeles and the United States force there of 40–50 men evacuated the city for a time. Later, U.S.forces fought minor scrimmages in the Battle of San Pasqual, the Battle of Dominguez Rancho, and the Battle of Rio San Gabriel. After the Los Angeles revolt started the California Battalion was expanded to a force of about 400 men. In early January 1847 a 600-man joint force of U.S. Marine, U.S. Navy bluejacket sailors, General Stephen W. Kearny's 80 U.S. Army dragoons (cavalrymen) and about two companies of Fremont's California Battalion re-occupied Los Angeles after some minor skirmishes—after four months the same U.S. fag again flew over Los Angeles. The minor armed resistance in California ceased when the Californios signed the Treaty of Cahuenga on 13 January 1847. The Californios who had wrested control of California from Mexico in 1845 now had a new government.

After the Treaty of Cahuenga was signed, the Pacific Squadron then went on to capture all Baja California cities and harbors and sink or capture all the Mexican Pacific Navy they could find. Baja California was returned to Mexico in subsequent Treaty of Guadalupe Hidalgo negotiations. More reinforcements of about 320 soldiers (and a few women) of the Mormon Battalion arrived at San Diego, California on 28 January 1847—after hostilities had ceased. They had been recruited from the Mormon camps on the Missouri River—about 2,000 miles (3,200 km) away. These troops were recruited with the understanding they would be discharged in California with their weapons. Most were discharged before July 1847. More reinforcements in the form of Colonel Jonathan D. Stevenson's 1st Regiment of New York Volunteers of about 648 men showed up in March–April 1847—again after hostilities had ceased. Three private merchant ships, Thomas H Perkins, Loo Choo, and Susan Drew, were chartered, and the sloop USS Preble was assigned convoy detail.

On 26 September the four ships left New York for California. Fifty men who had been left behind for various reasons sailed on 13 November 1846 on the small storeship USS Brutus. The Susan Drew and Loo Choo reached Valparaíso, Chile by 20 January 1847 and after getting fresh supplies, water and wood were on their way again by 23 January. The Perkins did not stop until San Francisco, reaching port on 6 March 1847. The Susan Drew arrived on 20 March 1847 and the Loo Choo arrived on 26 March 1847, 183 days after leaving New York. The Brutus finally arrived on 17 April 1847. After desertions and deaths in transit, four ships brought Stevenson's 648 men to California. Initially they took over all of the Pacific Squadron's on-shore military and garrison duties and the Mormon Battalion and California Battalion's garrison duties. The New York Volunteer companies were deployed from San Francisco in Alta California to La Paz, Mexico in Baja California.

The ship Isabella sailed from Philadelphia on 16 August 1847, with a detachment of one hundred soldiers, and arrived in California on 18 February 1848, the following year, at about the same time that the ship Sweden arrived with another detachment of soldiers. These soldiers were added to the existing companies of Stevenson's 1st Regiment of New York Volunteers. These troops were recruited with the understanding they would discharged in California. When gold was discovered in late January 1848, many of Stevenson's troops deserted.

=== California Gold Rush shipping ===
The first to hear confirmed information of the California Gold Rush were the people in Oregon, the Sandwich Islands (Hawaii), Mexico, Peru and Chile and they were the first to start flocking to the state in late 1848. By the end of 1848, some 6,000 Argonauts had come to California. President James K. Polk made the "official" announcement of the discovery of gold in California during his State of the Union Address on 5 December 1848 and displayed about 300 ounces of California gold at the War Department. Excitement grew as rumors, reports of officers and soldiers in California, newspaper accounts all seemed to confirm that there was a tremendous amount of gold in California—just waiting to be picked up. Sam Brannan, publisher of the newspaper the California Star at San Francisco, is regarded as starting the "Gold Rush" with stories about the large amount of gold found throughout late 1848 and 1849.

These "forty-niners" left behind families and jobs in the hope of instant wealth. A few succeeded handsomely, but the gold fields destroyed some and disappointed many more. The gold fields were very lucrative with up to $50,000,000 in gold being found every year for several years; but the gold finds were spread very unevenly. As the easily mined placer gold deposits were worked out the much more capital intensive hard rock mining took over. Americans and foreigners of many different countries, statuses, classes, and races rushed to California for gold. Almost all (~96%) were young men under age 40. Women in the California Gold Rush were initially less than 4% of the population in 1850 and had many opportunities to do new things and take on new tasks in women poor California. Argonauts, as they were often called, walked over the California Trail or came by sea. About 80,000 Argonauts arrived in 1849 alone—about 40,000 over the California trail and 40,000 by sea. In April 1850, a harbor master's estimate counted 62,000 people from across the globe arriving in San Francisco by ship in the preceding 12 months. Hundreds of ships lay abandoned, anchored in San Francisco Bay, their passengers and crews abandoning the ships to search for gold.

A popular concept of the California Gold Rush portrays the overland migration coming by wagon, yet according to the evidence, more people journeyed by sea. A typical wagon journey took about 140 days while a voyage by paddle wheel steamer, a short land trip and another paddle wheel steamer could be done in as short as 40 days over the Isthmus of Panama or Nicaragua route once the shipping lines were established in about 1850. Before farms could be set up, cities and industries built, etc. an early maritime traffic in passengers, food, lumber and building supplies were established with Pacific rim countries like Chile, Mexico, Hawaii and the future state of Oregon. Tools, clothing, and everything needed for an 1850 standard of living for miners and an expanding population would in most cases have to initially be imported from the East coast of the United States or Europe. Sea transport was about the only way cargo of any kind could be delivered to California. High value cargo like gold and passengers usually went by the Panama or Nicaragua route. Bulkier, lower value cargo, usually went by sailing ship around Cape Horn. A standard sailing ship took an average of about 200 days to go this route while the faster Clipper ships averaged about 140 days. Carrying any significant amount of goods cross country by wagon over 2,000 miles (3,200 km) of bad road was a slow, costly process that was seldom done. Not until the First transcontinental railroad was completed in 1869 was there any easy way to move cargo across land to California. Even today, bulky or heavy cargo is usually sent by ship because it is cheap and efficient, though slower than other methods.(Note: Paddle wheel steamers did not reach California by sea until long after the gold "rush" had ended. See later in this article for the date which was long after the "rush")

Some enterprising Argonauts set up businesses to furnish, feed, and entertain the region's growing population. Some merchants, gamblers, saloon keepers, entertainers, hotel owners, restaurant owners etc. were as likely to prosper as the successful prospectors. The lack of money (specie) often meant that transactions and wages were paid in several different currencies or in gold dust. The population of San Francisco boomed as it was the main entry point for sea born travelers and goods of all kinds. San Francisco by 1850 was declared the main Port of entry in California for all imported goods. The federal government's got 91% of its income in 1850 from tariffs or custom duties of about 23% on foreign imports. By 1850 San Francisco had a population of about 20,000 (the largest city in California then) that had swelled to over 36,000 by the 1852 California Census. The population of California grew from 8,000 in 1846 to about 120,000 in 1850.

The vast majority of the California Argonauts (as they were frequently called) were young Anglo men from the United States. Those on the East Coast who could afford the trip usually traveled on paddle steamers and occasionally sailing ships to Panama, Nicaragua or Mexico; they then traveled by land to the Pacific and caught another ship to California. Those who lived in the Mid West usually went by wagon, as many already had a wagon and team and were familiar with wagon travel and often already had or could quickly purchase any additional wagons, animals, supplies and equipment needed for a long wagon trip.(A great many Chinese men came to California, very early in the Gold Rush, having only to cross the Pacific by boat, rather than sail all the way around The Horn or cross the treacherous Isthmus of Panama as many of the Anglo men had to do.)

The traffic to California was so heavy that in two years these settlers, combined with those coming by wagon from Salt Lake City (Salt Lake was not yet a city, by any means; it was a "new" settlement, where the Mormon leaders had taken their people with the hope of living in peace, free from outsiders), Utah to Los Angeles in winter, the travelers down the Gila River trail in Arizona. (See Notes:) to make it the 31st state. All land routes were restricted to the seasons where travel was feasible. The trip by wagon was a four- to six-month ordeal across over 2,000 miles (3,200 km) of land from a Missouri River town to California or across the deserts of Arizona or Nevada to California. Those going by wagon train could not leave until the snow melted and the trails were dry and enough grass had started to feed their livestock—usually early May. Most of those traveling by wagon already lived in the mid-west and many already had a wagon. The Salt Lake City, Utah to Los Angeles trail was usually restricted by lack of water to winter. [The vast majority of the early travelers came from the settlements near the Missouri River who left the river in the Spring when dangers of snow had passed, and traveling by wagon, cart, or mule (more durable than horses) they moved westward.]

There were four major routes by sea: paddle steamer (or occasionally sailing ship) to the future countries of Panama, Nicaragua or Mexico, a trip across land to the Pacific and then a trip by paddle steamer to California. These routes were used by travelers who could afford them being the fastest—about 40–60 days. The other major sea route was by sea around Cape Horn or the Magellan Straits and on to California—this trip typically took over 200 days and was the main shipping route for merchandise. Most of those traveling by ship lived on the Eastern seaboard and were acquainted with sea borne commerce and travel.

Those traveling by land and sea to California had enough residents in California by 1850 (about 120,000 by corrected 1850 U.S. Census data) (See Notes:) for California in 1850 to become the 31st state.

==== The paddlewheel steamer ====
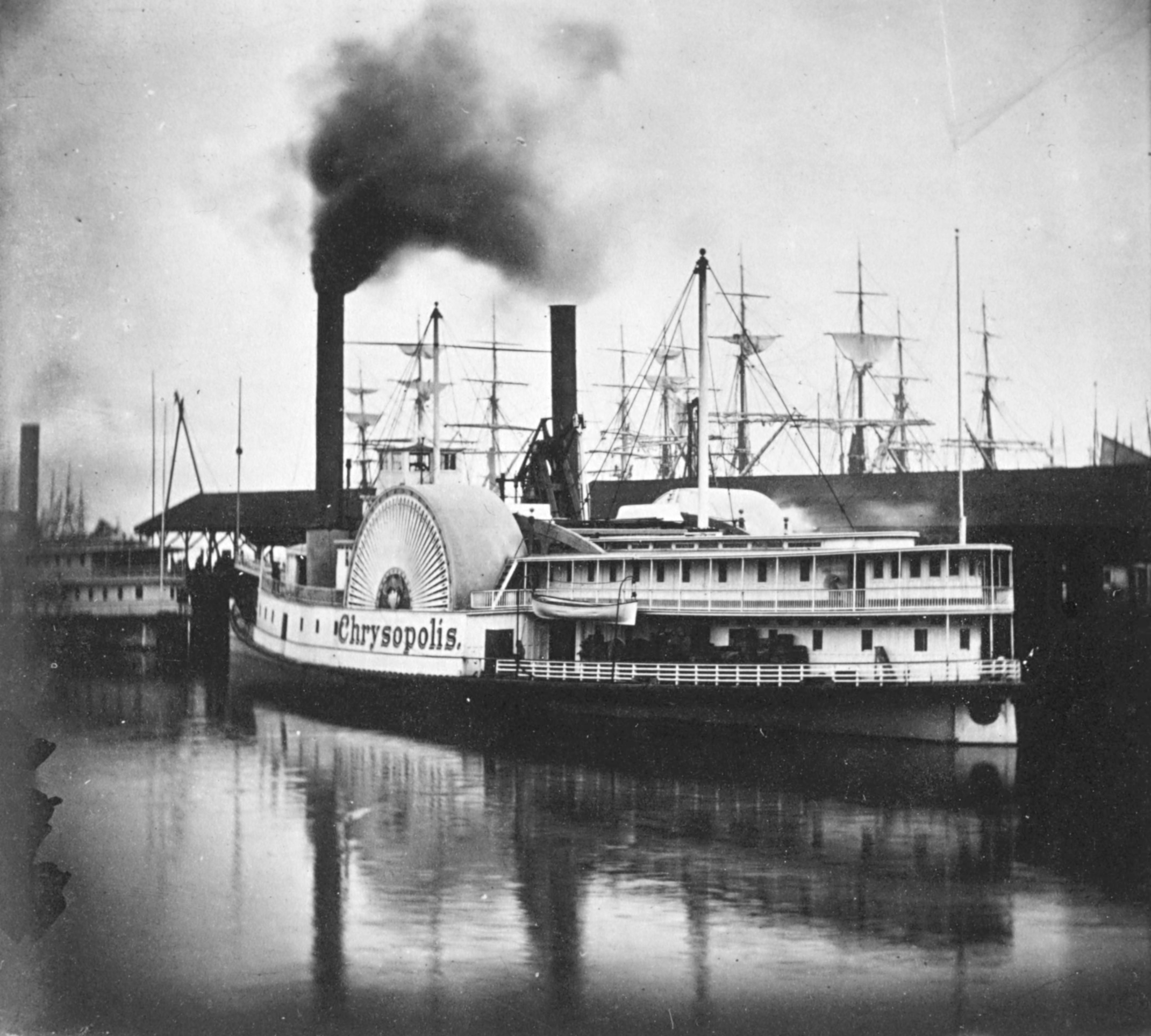
The sidewheel steamboat Chrysopolis was launched in 1860 for the San Francisco to Sacramento route.

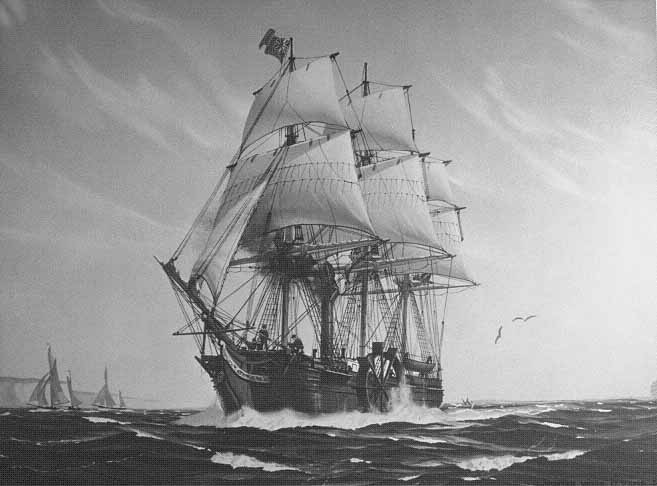
SS Savannah, the first steam-powered ship to cross the Atlantic Ocean—1819

By 1849 the shipping industry was in transition from sail-powered boats to steam-powered boats and from wood construction to an ever-increasing metal construction. There were basically three different types of ships being used: standard sailing ships of several different types. Clippers, and paddle steamers with paddles mounted on the side or rear. River steam boats typically used rear mounted paddles and had flat bottoms and shallow hulls designed to carry large loads on generally smooth and occasionally shallow rivers. Ocean-going paddle steamers typically used side-wheeled paddles and used narrower deeper hulls designed to travel in the often stormy weather encountered at sea. The ship hull design was often based on the clipper ship design with extra bracing to support the loads and strains imposed by the paddle wheels when they encountered rough water.

The first paddle-steamer to make a long ocean voyage was the 320-ton, 98-foot-long (30 m) SS Savannah, built in 1819 expressly for packet ship mail and passenger service to and from Liverpool, England. On 22 May 1819, the watch on the Savannah sighted Ireland after 23 days at sea. The Allaire Iron Works of New York supplied Savannah's's engine cylinder, while the rest of the engine components and running gear were manufactured by the Speedwell Ironworks of New Jersey. The 90-horsepower low-pressure engine was of the inclined direct-acting type, with a single 40-inch-diameter (100 cm) cylinder and a 5 feet (1.5 m) stroke. Savannah's engine and machinery were unusually large for their time. The ship's wrought-iron paddlewheels were 16 feet in diameter with eight buckets per wheel. For fuel, the vessel carried 75 tons of coal and 25 cords (91 m^{3}) of wood.

The SS Savannah was too small to carry much fuel, and the engine was intended only for use in calm weather and to get in and out of harbors. Under favorable winds the sails alone were able to provide a speed of at least four knots. The Savannah was judged not a commercial success and its engine was removed and it was converted back to a regular sailing ship. By 1848 steamboats built by both United States and British shipbuilders were already in use for mail and passenger service across the Atlantic Ocean—a 3,000 miles (4,800 km) journey.

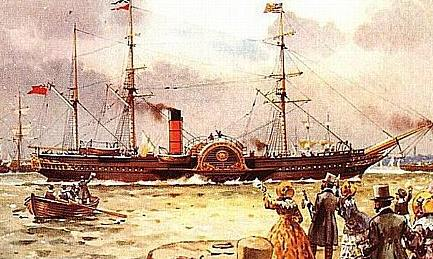
Britannia of 1840 (1150 GRT), the first Cunard liner built for the transatlantic service.

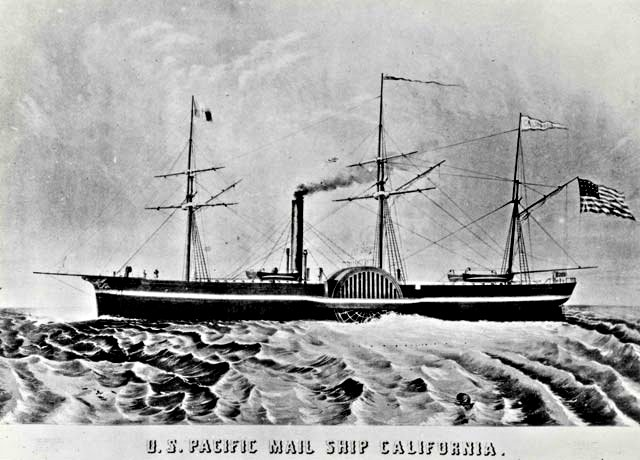
SS California (1848), the first paddle steamer to steam between Panama City and San Francisco--a Pacific Mail Steamship Company ship.

Since paddle steamers typically required from 5 to 16 tons of coal per day to keep their engines running, they were more expensive to run. Initially, nearly all seagoing steamboats were equipped with mast and sails to supplement the steam engine power and provide power for occasions when the steam engine needed repair or maintenance. These steamships typically concentrated on high value cargo, mail and passengers and only had moderate cargo capabilities because of their required loads of coal. The typical paddle wheel steamship was powered by a coal burning engine that required firemen to shovel the coal to the burners.

By 1849 the screw propeller had been invented and was slowly being introduced as iron increasingly was used in ship construction and the stress introduced by propellers could be compensated for. As the 1800s progressed the timber and lumber needed to make wooden ships got ever more expensive and the iron plate needed for iron ship construction got much cheaper as the massive iron works at Merthyr Tydfil, Wales, for example, got ever more efficient. The propeller put a lot of stress on the rear of the ships and would not see large spread use till the conversion from wood boats to iron boats was complete—well underway by 1860. By the 1840s the ocean-going steam ship industry was well established as the Cunard Line and others demonstrated.

In 1846 the Oregon boundary dispute was settle with Great Britain and California was conquered in 1847 and annexed in 1848. The United States was now a Pacific Ocean power. Starting in 1848 Congress, after the annexation of California but before the California Gold Rush was confirmed there, had subsidized the Pacific Mail Steamship Company with $199,999 to set up regular packet ship, mail, passenger and cargo routes in the Pacific Ocean. This was to be a regular scheduled route from Panama City, Nicaragua and Mexico to and from San Francisco and Oregon. Panama City was the Pacific terminus of the Isthmus of Panama trail across Panama. The Atlantic Ocean mail contract from East Coast cities and New Orleans to and from the Chagres River in Panama was won by the United States Mail Steamship Company whose first paddle wheel steamship, the SS Falcon (1848) was dispatched on 1 December 1848 to the Caribbean (Atlantic) terminus of the Isthmus of Panama trail—the Chagres River.

The SS California (1848), the first Pacific Mail Steamship Company paddle wheel steamship, left New York City on 6 October 1848 with only a partial load of her about 60 saloon (about $300 fare) and 150 steerage (about $150 fare) passenger capacity. Only a few were going all the way to California. Her crew numbered about 36 men. She left New York well before confirmed word of the California Gold Rush had reached the East Coast. Once the California Gold Rush was confirmed by President James Polk in his State of the Union address on 5 December 1848 people started rushing to Panama City to catch the SS California. The SS California picked up more passengers in Valparaíso, Chile, and Panama City, Panama, and showed up in San Francisco, loaded with about 400 passengers—twice the passengers it had been designed for—on 28 February 1849. She had left behind about another 400-600 potential passengers still looking for passage from Panama City. The SS California had made the trip from Panama and Mexico after steaming around Cape Horn from New York—see SS California (1848).

The trips by paddle wheel steamship to Panama and Nicaragua from New York, Philadelphia, Boston, via New Orleans and Havana were about 2,600 miles (4,200 km) long and took about two weeks. Trips across the Isthmus of Panama or Nicaragua typically took about one week by native canoe and mule back. The 4,000 miles (6,400 km) trip to or from San Francisco to Panama City could be done by paddle wheel steamer in about three weeks. In addition to this travel time via the Panama route typically had a two- to four-week waiting period to find a ship going from Panama City, Panama, to San Francisco before 1850. It was 1850 before enough paddle wheel steamers were available in the Atlantic and Pacific routes to establish regularly scheduled journeys.

Other steamships soon followed and by late 1849 paddle wheel steamships like the SS Mckim (1848) were carrying miners and their supplies the 125 miles (201 km) trip from San Francisco up the extensive Sacramento–San Joaquin River Delta to Stockton, California, Marysville, California, Sacramento, etc. to get about 125 miles (201 km) closer to the gold fields. Steam powered tugboats and towboats started working in the San Francisco Bay soon after this to expedite shipping in and out of the bay.

As the passenger, mail and high value freight business to and from California boomed more and more paddle steamers were brought into service—eleven by the Pacific Mail Steamship Company alone. The trip to and from California via Panama and paddle wheeled steamers could be done, if there were no waits for shipping, in about 40 days—over 100 days less than by wagon or 160 days less than a trip around Cape Horn. About 20-30% of the California Argonauts are thought to have returned to their homes, mostly on the East Coast of the United States via Panama—the fastest way home. Many returned to California after settling their business in the East with their wives, family and/or sweethearts. Most used the Panama or Nicaragua route till 1855 when the completion of the Panama Railroad made the Panama Route much easier, faster and more reliable. Between the 1849 and 1869 when the First transcontinental railroad was completed across the United States about 800,000 travelers had used the Panama route. Most of the roughly $50,000,000 of gold found each year in California were shipped East via the Panama route on paddle steamers, mule trains and canoes and later the Panama Railroad across Panama. After 1855 when the Panama Railroad was completed the Panama Route was by far the quickest and easiest way to get to or from California from the East Coast of the U.S. or Europe. Most California bound merchandise still used the slower but cheaper Cape Horn sailing ship route. The sinking of the paddle steamer SS Central America (the Ship of Gold)) in a hurricane on 12 September 1857 and the loss of about $2 million in California gold indirectly led to the Panic of 1857.

==== The sailing ships ====
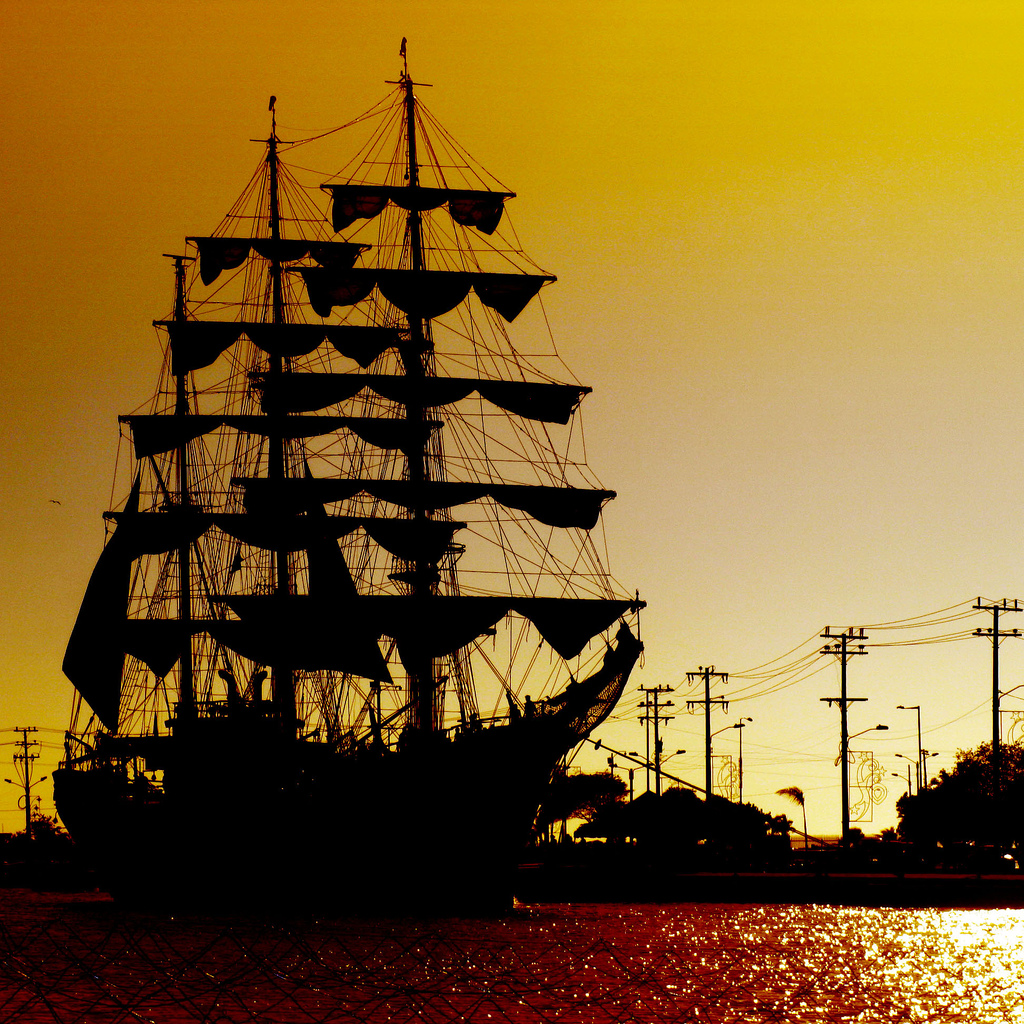
Colombian training ship ARC Gloria at sunset in Cartagena, Colombia.

Regular sailing ships that had been developed and refined over centuries of use were the cheapest and the slowest transports available. There were several types of sailing ships. They had typically been optimized to carry a large amount of cargo using a small crew of about 20 men and utilized sails in a combination of fore-and-aft rigging and square rigging. Unless the cargo was time sensitive, they were utilized for nearly all long-distance shipping and passenger service. At the end of the sailing era windjammers were developed to carry large volumes of low value cargo long distances. Some of the most popular ships were four-masted barques, since the four-masted barque is considered the most efficient rig available because of its ease of handling, small need of manpower, good running capabilities, and good capabilities of rising toward wind.

Once in San Francisco the crews often deserted the ships. The ship owners found little cargo of value to ship back to the East Coast out of California and the ships often went back in ballast with a cargo of useless rocks. Since many of the ships were older and required expensive maintenance and crews were very hard to find and/or very expensive many hundreds of vessels were simply abandoned or sold at very low cost in Yerba Buena Cove. Others were converted into store ships or floating warehouses, stores, hotels, prisons, etc.. Some abandoned ships were bought cheap, filled with ballast and sunk on the mud flats at high tide to enlarge the available wharves and docks. The ships were typically stripped of her upper works and all usable fittings by one of San Francisco's many marine salvage firms of Gold Rush days and then covered with debris and sand as developers filled in the mud flats on the bay and built wharves out to deeper water to accommodate docking ships. By 1857 nearly all abandoned shipping in the Yerba Buena Cove that had not been re-used was sent to a marine salvage or ship breaking firms where all usable fixtures, anchors, etc. were removed, the copper bottom (about 8,000 pounds (3,600 kg) of copper) salvaged and the timbers were removed and set aside for other uses.

The rapidly expanding city of San Francisco needed room to store all of the incoming goods and much larger dockside facilities—there were none when California was annexed. There initially was not time to build adequate warehouses, wharves, docks on the water front. In early September 2001, the General Harrison, was discovered at the northwest corner of Battery and Clay streets during construction. She was built in 1840 in Newburyport, Massachusetts, and abandoned sometime before 1850 and turned into a store ship (warehouse). She was 126.1 feet (38.4 m) long, 26.5 feet (8.1 m) wide, 13.25 feet (4.04 m) in depth and displaced 409 tons. She was burned to the water line in one of San Francisco's early fires. The remains, including some of the stores on board, were filled with sand and built over.

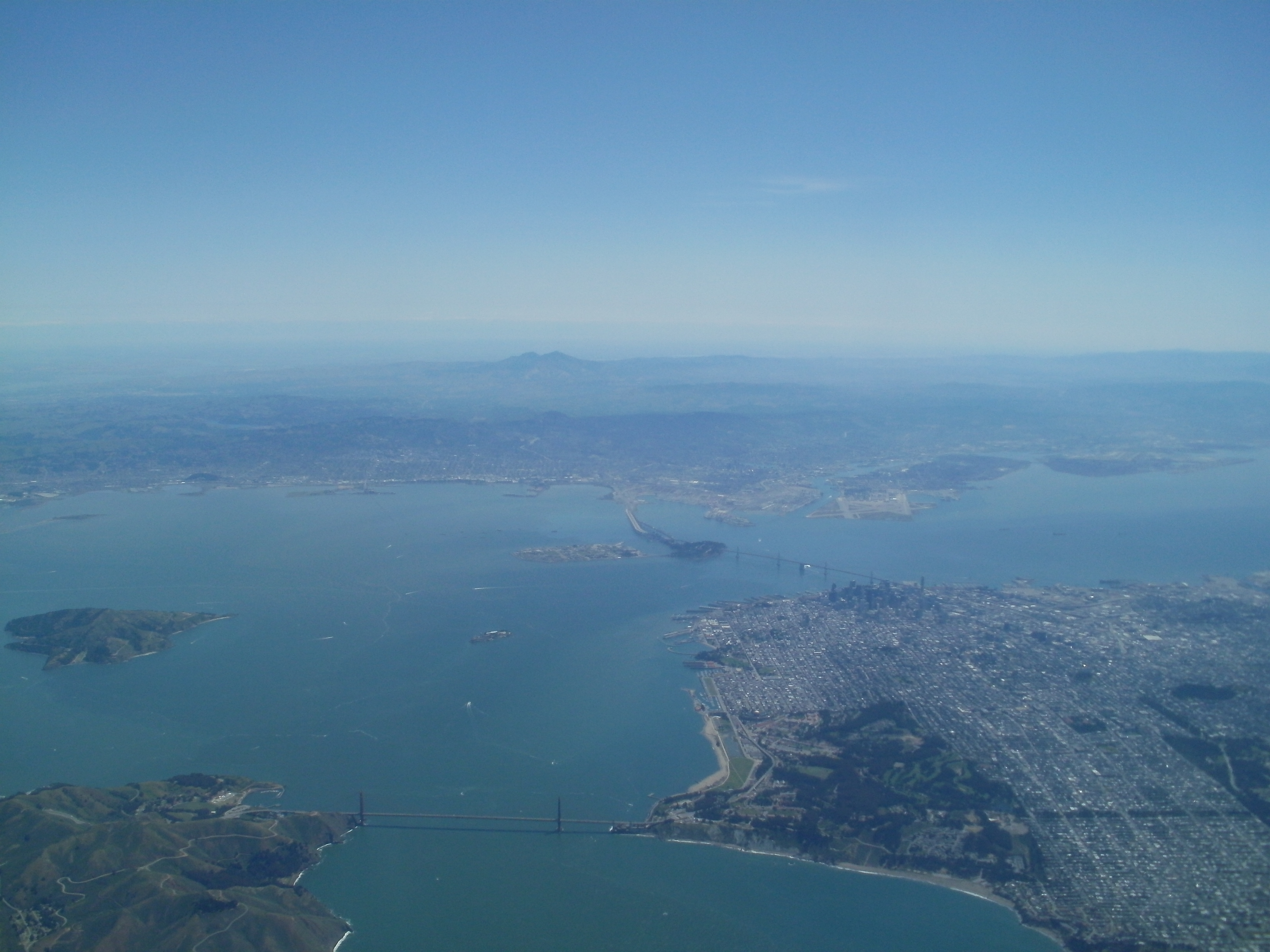
Aerial view of San Francisco Bay looking east from the Pacific.

The average realized speed for the typical sailing ship was about 3.5 miles (5.6 km) per hour, the clippers could often reach about 10 miles (16 km)per hour of realized speed with steam ships averaging about 8 miles (13 km)per hour.

==== The clippers ====
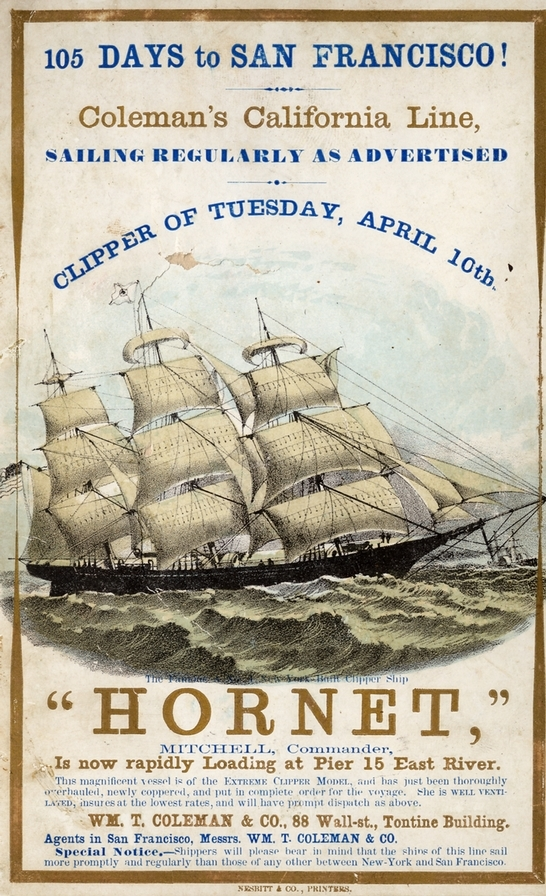
Hornet An advertisement of an American clipper ship of the 1850s

The clippers, developed and mainly used between about 1840 and 1860 were some of the last and "best" commercial sailing ships invented. The clippers had more sails and faster hulls and were some of the fastest sailing ships ever developed. The clippers required a larger crew to man the larger expanse of sails and typically carried high value cargo with few passenger accommodations. Under ideal conditions clippers have been logged at over 20 mph (17 kn; 32 km/h)—covering over 450 miles (720 km) in one day. The average speed over a long journey was about 8 mph (7.0 kn; 13 km/h). The typical clipper carried high value, large volume cargo and normally carried only about six passengers. They competed with the paddle steamers on the shorter Panama, Nicaragua, and Mexican routes. Because of their shorter runs these paddle steamers were faster but much more costly to run and typically only took high value cargo like passengers, mail and gold shipments. Clippers averaged about 120 days passage on the about 17,000 miles (27,000 km) trip between East Coast cities and San Francisco—about 80 days faster travel than the conventional sailing ships.

In 1845 the Rainbow, 757 tons OM, the first extreme clipper was launched in New York. These American clippers were larger vessels designed to sacrifice cargo capacity for speed. They had a bow lengthened above the water, a drawing out and sharpening of the forward body, and the greatest breadth further aft. Extreme clippers were built in the period 1845 to 1855.

Clippers sometimes took a trip across the Pacific Ocean to Shanghai or some other port in China to pick up a cargo of tea, silk, porcelain, etc. for a profitable return trip to their home port. The alternative was to return in ballast with a useless cargo of rocks. Some Clippers were used on the Hawaii to California routes as they shipped mainly food stocks to California.

In 1853 the clipper Flying Cloud sailed from New York City and made San Francisco around Cape Horn in 89 days, 8 hours; a record that stood 136 years until 1989 when the breakthrough-designed sailboat Thursday's Child completed the passage in 80 days and 20 hours at the BOC Challenge 1986–87. The record was once again broken in 2008 by the special built French racing yacht Gitana 13, with a time of 43 days and 38 minutes.

==== To California via Panama ====
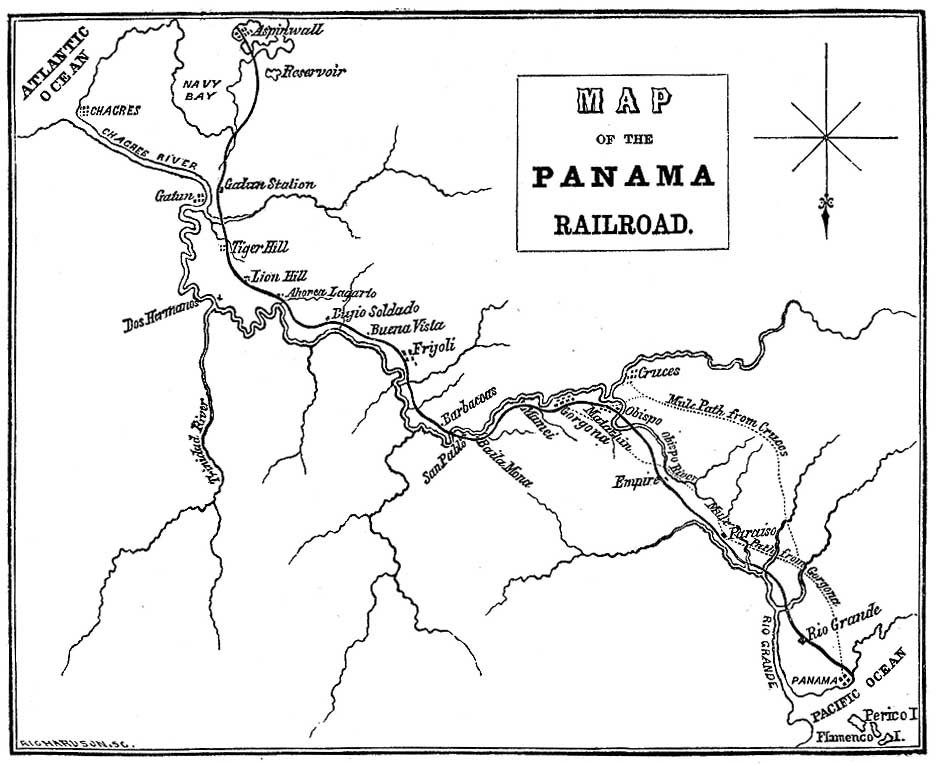
Map of the route across Panama and the Panama Railroad

By mid-1849 there were steamship lines dropping people from off at the mouth of the Chagres River on the Caribbean side of Panama. There were then no docking facilities off the Chagres River mouth and passengers had to come ashore in small boats—not an easy task in bad weather. The east to west transit across the Isthmus of Panama was about 30 miles (48 km) by native dugout boats (later modified lifeboats were used) up the often wild and dangerous Chagres River and then by mule back for the final 20 miles (32 km) over the old Spanish trails. The trails had fallen into serious disrepair after almost 50+ years of little or no maintenance and up to 3 meters of rain each year in the roughly April to December rainy season. One of the major problems was getting reliable transport of luggage and freight over the Isthmus of Panama. Even after all arrangements were made and payments made it was not unusual to have to wait weeks longer in Panama City for your luggage to arrive. A transit from the Atlantic to the Pacific (or from Pacific to Atlantic) would usually take four to eight days by dugout canoe and mule back. The transit was fraught with dangers and disease.

After the arrival in Panama City the traveler had to wait in a hot, dirty, crowded, disease laden city for their luggage to arrive and then for passage on a paddle steamer or sailing ship headed to California. One of the main problems initially encountered was getting further passage on a ship to California—there were not enough ships to carry the passengers and cargo that built up in Panama City. By late 1849 paddle steamer routes had been established to and from Panama City and other ports in Nicaragua and Mexico to San Francisco. Panama City had a poor harbor and again the ships anchored off shore and a small boat was required to board them.

Those going to California by crossing Panama, Nicaragua or Mexico had a much quicker trip than going around Cape Horn or taking the California Trail to California. A typical trip could be done in about 30–90 days assuming shipping and transit connections could be made. The biggest handicap the Panama, Nicaragua or Mexico routes had was the wait until scheduled Pacific shipping was established in late 1849 to carry them to California. These routes also suffered form the risk of catching a possibly fatal disease and having to potentially endure threats of attack by bandits. Unfortunately, getting shipping from the Pacific ports of Panama, Nicaragua, or Mexico to California was very problematic until mid to late 1849. Mail, returning gold miners and gold shipments nearly all used the Panama Route. The number of passengers who used the Panama route in 1849 and 1850 is unknown but must be numbered in the tens of thousands. In 1851 29,600 passengers used the Panama Route. This increased to 33,000 passengers in 1852 and dropped to 27,200 passengers in 1853. by the time the First transcontinental railroad was completed in the United States in 1869, it is believed 800,000 travelers had used the Panama Route to get to and from California. Its estimated that 20% of the original Argonauts left to return home—most via the Panama Route. Many returned to California with their wives and families.

As steamships became available, regular paddle steamer service opened a major mail, passenger and high value cargo link between the two coasts of the United States. The first transcontinental railroad, the Panama Railroad, was finished in 1855 at a cost of about 5,000 lives and $8,000,000 and provided a major faster link with the East Coast and West Coast. Regardless of how the miners had originally got to California nearly all returned East via Panama—the easiest and fastest route. The returning miners and the returning gold were welcomed in the East and the mail and newspapers exchanged soon established strong east–west bonds. After it was completed in 1855 the ease of use of the Panama Railroad meant that the Panama Route carried most of the high value, time sensitive freight to and from California. Most female traffic went from east to west over the Panama Route which was the easiest and fasted route after about 1852. Women in the California Gold Rush were scarce but played a major role in settling California. Wives' and sweethearts' passage via Panama to California was normally paid for by miners or businessmen who had decided to stay in California. These women arriving in nearly every ship from Panama soon changed the character of women scarce California as they rapidly outnumbered the prostitutes who had initially flocked there.

Money in California was scarce as very few had brought much with them and the costly living expenses soon exhausted much of it. Shipments of specie from several different countries were brought in but they never seemed to be enough and workers were happy to be paid in an amalgam of several different coins from several different countries. Loose gold dust was valued at $16.00 per troy ounce then and almost all merchants, bars, gambling dens, brothels etc. had scales available to allow the miners to pay for their purchases in gold. After passing through many hands in California gold eventually, almost inevitably, went East to pay for merchandise bought in the west and imported from the East. The primary gold shipment route was via well-guarded paddle steamers to Panama. Well guarded mule and canoe trips to the mouth of the Chagres River and from their by paddle steamer to New York, etc. Bandits called the Derienni, initially, often raided these shipments until many of the bandits were caught and hanged—this stopped most of the outbreak of violence. Gold shipments on Panama paddle steamers often totaled over $1,000,000 per voyage and an accumulative total of over $64,000,000 in gold by 1853.

==== To California via Mexico ====
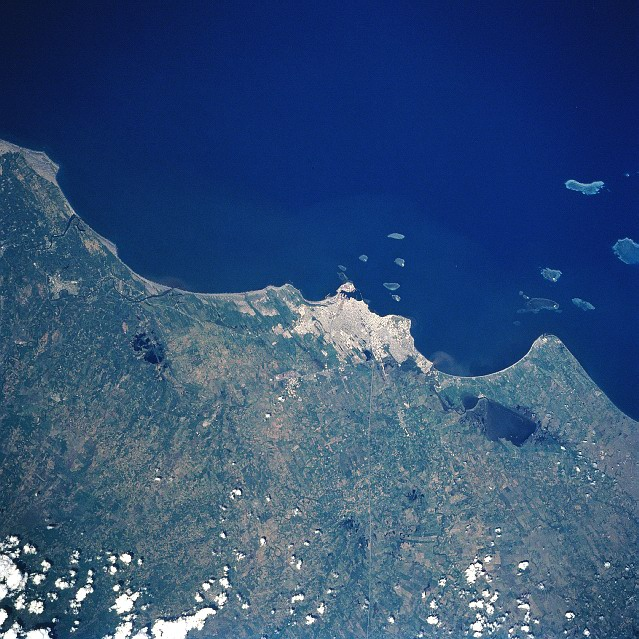
Satellite view of Veracruz

The Mexican route usually involved taking passage in a paddle steamer to Veracruz Mexico, making your way 500 miles (800 km) across Mexico to Acapulco on Mexico's Pacific coast. This reversed the path taken by much of the Manila galleons' cargo from Manila which was unloaded at Acapulco and transferred to Veracruz for further shipment to Spain. The Manila galleons were Spain's main link to the spices from the Spice Islands and silk etc. from China. By 1849 the paddle steamer had been developed and Veracruz soon became a scheduled stop for many paddle steamers. One of the main hazards of this route was being accosted by robbers and it was recommended that this passage should by done in groups of 50 or more. After the Panama Railroad was completed in 1855 with a cost of about 5,000 lives and $8,000,000 the Mexico route was almost shut down.

Other longer routes typically involved landing at Tampico, Mexico, and then traversing the country to catch a ship in Mazatlán, Mexico. These routes were used mainly by those who had business in Mexico City or some other Mexican city. All Mexican travel suffered from the relative lack of steamship service and risk of robberies compared to the Nicaragua and Panama route.

==== To California via Nicaragua ====
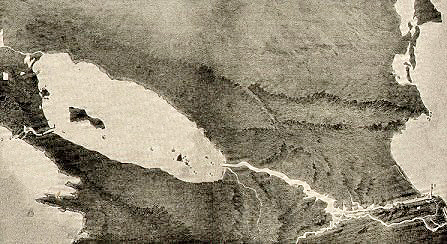
Artist's conception of the proposed canal showing the San Juan River, Lake Nicaragua and the Caribbean Sea

Wider than Panama, the Nicaragua route had the advantage of the easily navigated San Juan River and Lake Nicaragua with only a short excursion to the Pacific. By 1851 trips by steamship to Panama and Nicaragua from New York, Philadelphia, Boston and New Orleans were about 2,600 miles (4,200 km) long and took about two weeks by steamship. Commodore Cornelius Vanderbilt established a route through Nicaragua in 1850 that would shorten the water distance between New York and San Francisco by nearly 500 miles (800 km). The route was by paddle steamer to the San Juan River in Nicaragua and then up the river by small steamboat or native craft to Lake Nicaragua. After transiting the lake by small boat the travelers could exit and take a stagecoach or mule ride to San Juan del Sur or other city in the Pacific side of Nicaragua. From there it was a short steamer ride to San Francisco after steamship lines were established. By early 1852 Vanderbilt was employing seven steamers and offering serious competition to the Panama route.

Early travelers til about 1851 had a difficult time knowing if and when a paddle steamer would arrive. Vanderbilt started his service with steamer Independence in July 1851 and was soon joined by the steamer Prometheus and Pacific. The line prospered offering serious competition to the Pacific Mail Steamship Company. By 1852 there are a recorded 17,400 Nicaragua crossing passengers compared to 29,600 crossing Panama. These numbers closed to 24,000 Nicaragua crossings in 1852 to 27,200 Panama crossings in 1853. As the Panama Railroad progressed across the Isthmus of Panama they took more and more of the traffic and after the railroad was completed in 1855 with a cost of about 5,000 lives and $8,000,000, combined with civil strife in Nicaragua, the Nicaragua route was almost shut down.

==== To California via Cape Horn ====
When news of the California Gold Rush was confirmed late in 1848, many on the East Coast were ready to start on their way to California. The route was well known because of the many whaling ships that had already traversed Cape Horn on their way to Pacific whaling grounds or ports of call in Hawaii and California. In most East Coast cities, there were mariners who were well acquainted with the Cape Horn route and who knew precisely how to prepare for a voyage to California. One of the chief advantages of the Cape Horn route was that they could leave at any time of the year they could find a ship. There were also travelers nicknamed "Argonauts", who foresaw the broad needs and demands of a mining center on the Pacific Coast and who brought along goods of all descriptions and sizes, from needles to knocked-down steamboats, on which they hoped to realize good profits. Indeed, some had no intention to do actual mining but to earn their fortune by providing goods and services to the miners.

Most passengers initially got sea-sick and had a miserable time before getting their sea legs. The nature of the passage, involving crossing the equator twice, and the length of the average voyage in miles and time (often more than six months) resulted in unusual supply difficulties. Some ships stocked chickens, pigs or goats to supply fresh eggs and meat some time during the voyage. Large amounts of fresh water and food (usually salted meat and sea biscuits or hardtack) were required for the trip. The salted meat (about the only way meat could be preserved then) would have to be soaked overnight in fresh water to leach out the salt and make it semi-edible. Most Captains understood the causes of scurvy and provided some lemon or lime juice to prevent it. Despite the monotonous and often tasteless fare, many gained weight on the trip since they had virtually nothing to do except occasional laundry and endless card games. Storms were a time of high suspense as the storm tossed their ship heavily from side to side and end to end. Goods, suitcases, etc. not tied down were soon rolling and sliding across the decks. Clothes were often washed by tying them to a rope and letting them be pulled behind the ship. Many spent hours fishing but rarely caught anything. When fish were caught they were a welcome addition to the monotonous diet. Sleeping was often done in crowded passenger quarters or on the deck—weather permitting. If the weather was fine and the crew permitted it, many tied a hammock in the rigging and slept outside. Those who purchased cabin fare usually had a narrow cabin with a door and a cot that was under 5.5 feet (1.7 m) long (people were shorter then) and about 1.5 feet (0.46 m) wide. The only extra room was the space under the bed for personal effects and luggage. Those who paid "steerage" fares (about 50% less) slept in common bunk rooms.

It was common practice to stop in at least two ports en route in order to take on additional supplies of fresh food, water and wood as well as a welcome chance to get off the ships. Rio de Janeiro or Santa Catarina, Brazil (often called St. Catharine's then) were common stopping places on the Atlantic side of South America. Some passengers were so desperate for fresh food that they often procured thousands of oranges or other fruit that was ripe while they were there and ate it after they continued on.

The Strait of Magellan comprises a navigable sea route immediately south of mainland South America and north of Tierra del Fuego. The waterway is the most important natural passage between the Pacific and the Atlantic oceans, but it is considered a difficult route to navigate because of the unpredictable winds and currents and the narrowness of the passage.

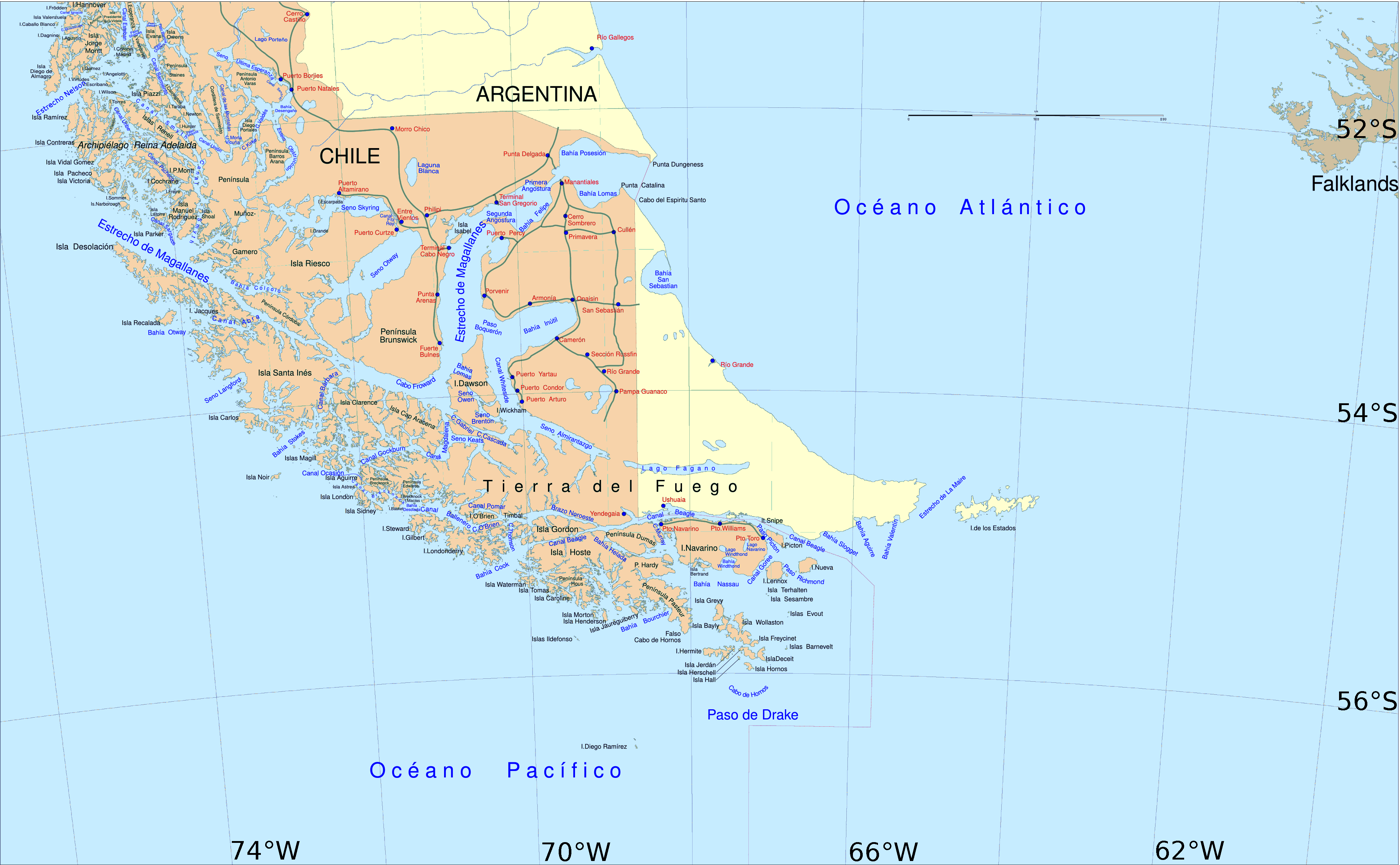
Strait of Magellan, and Tierra del Fuego

Captains who elected to utilize the Strait of Magellan to bypass Cape Horn and shorten the trip by about 500 miles (800 km) experienced a passage of from three to six weeks' duration in surroundings so forbidding and monotonous it often provoked despair. The narrow channels of the straits and the unpredictable currents, tides, and winds were constant hazards, especially to sailing vessels; steam-powered vessels had an easier passage.

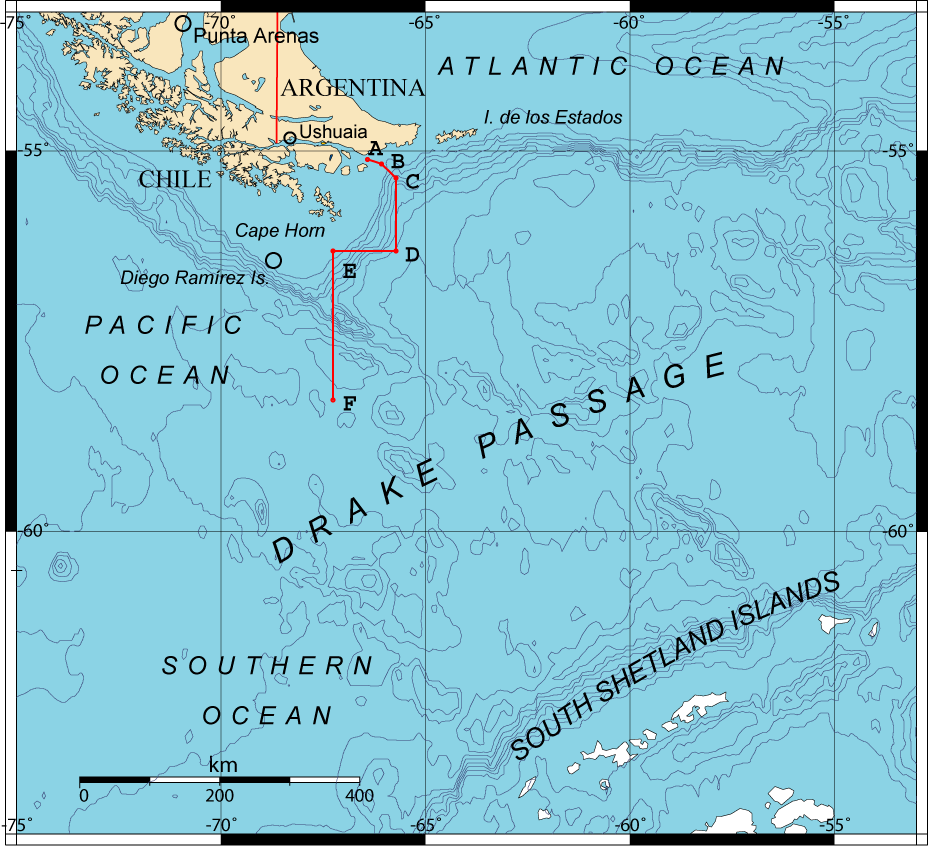
Drake Passage showing the boundary points A, B, C, D, E and F accorded by the Treaty of Peace and Friendship of 1984 between Chile and Argentina

The other main way around South America was by way of Drake Passage, south of Cape Horn – the body of water between the southern tip of South America at Cape Horn, Chile and the South Shetland Islands of Antarctica. It connects the southwestern part of the Atlantic Ocean (Scotia Sea) with the southeastern part of the Pacific Ocean and extends into the Southern Ocean. The passage is named after the 16th-century English privateer, Francis Drake, who was the first to discover it in 1578. Most sailing ship captains preferred the Drake Passage, which is open water for hundreds of miles, despite being often marked by very rough conditions and high winds. There is no significant land anywhere around the world at the 55.6 to 62.8 degrees south latitude of the Drake Passage. This is important to the unimpeded flow of the Antarctic Circumpolar Current, which carries a huge volume of water (about 600 times the flow of the Amazon River) through the passage and around Antarctica.

In the Pacific Juan Fernández Islands of Talcahuano, Valparaíso, Chile or Callao, Peru were among the favorite watering and re-stocking ports in the Pacific. Valparaíso, despite its mediocre harbor, then was the main entrepôt (trans-shipping) port on the Pacific side of South America. After leaving the South American coast, the ships were buffeted by often baffling and contrary breezes as they traveled across the equatorial trade winds before reaching California waters. Contrary winds often forced the ships far out into the Pacific – sometimes as distant as 140 degrees west (-140°) longitude before they encountered a favorable on-shore breeze and could sail towards San Francisco Bay. San Francisco is at 122.5 degrees west (-122.5°) longitude.

The last hazards to California-bound vessels were the approach and entrance to San Francisco Bay. The Farallon Islands off the mouth of San Francisco Bay were the graveyard of several ships, and the narrow, often fog-shrouded opening into San Francisco Bay was always a danger. Soon after the ship traffic built up, ship pilots who were knowledgeable of the bay were at work boarding incoming (and outgoing) ships and guiding the ships to a safe anchorage in the bay. By 1851 the tangle of ships in the bay had led to the creation of a harbormaster who dictated where ships could drop anchor. Once inside San Francisco Bay, vessels were reported and identified to the people of San Francisco by the watchman with a telescope in a tower erected in September 1849 on Telegraph Hill, San Francisco. The watchman hoisted up the telegraph mast, one semaphore arm for a schooner, two for a brig, three for a ship and two raised about 45 degrees for a paddle steamer. These signals were soon known by most residents.

Once inside the bay and anchored, the next visitors were typically members of the Revenue Cutter Service (predecessor of U.S. Coast Guard). Founded by Alexander Hamilton on 4 August 1790, the Revenue Cutter Service is the United States' oldest continuous seagoing service and enforced the tariff laws and tariff collection via customs duties (tariffs or ad valorem taxes) on foreign import goods. In the 1800s about 85–95% of the money collected and used by the Federal Government was from tariff collections. Customs collections were set up by late 1847 in San Francisco—the designated port of entry for most of California. Soon after the revenuers had arrived, the ships were often visited by merchants looking for first choice on the arriving goods.

The all-sea trip around Cape Horn to California by standard sailing vessels typically took about 200 days (about 6.5 months) and covered 16,000–18,000 miles (26,000–29,000 km). Some trips took almost a year. The all-sea route enabled enterprising emigrants to ship baggage and supplies they hoped to sell in California for gold dust. The Cape Horn route was essentially the only route where low, medium or high weight or high volume goods could be shipped cheaply. Other routes, which often cost significantly more, usually specialized in high value, low weight goods like mail, passengers or gold dust. Starting out with essentially nothing, goods from the East Coast or Britain were often desperately needed and usually sold for high profits. The long delay between seeing a market, ordering the goods and shipping the goods made business risky. Some of the cargoes that were usually profitable were food, liquor, lumber and building supplies. Ship loads of other types of goods sometimes saturated the marketplace, forcing the goods to be auctioned off at a loss. Most cargoes included a variety of goods to minimize this problem.

When the Central Pacific Railroad started construction of the First transcontinental railroad in 1863, all their locomotives, box cars, rails and railroad supplies were shipped via this route. It was slow, but a ship going around Cape Horn to California could carry high weight and high volume products cheaper than any other route. Nearly all the ships that were abandoned in San Francisco Bay came by the Cape Horn route. Since the route back to the East coast was so long and return cargo almost nonexistent, the ships which arrived in San Francisco initially tended to stay there as the crew and passengers abandoned the ship for the gold fields. As it became clear what was needed in San Francisco and the rest of California, some of the newer ships were put back into service with higher paid crews. Some were crewed by disillusioned gold diggers seeking a cheap way back home. Many ships were used for shorter runs to Pacific ports for food supplies or lumber—essentially all that was available then. During October 1849, 63 vessels left San Francisco; 25 sailed for South America, primarily Valparaíso or Callao; 10 vessels sailed for the Hawaiian islands (20–30 days each way), 9 went to Oregon and 9 to other non-Pacific ports. The high fares initially charged for paddle steamer passages to Panama induced some captains to allow passengers to work their way back to the East Coast for a low cost return. This made it possible to put a crew together at a "reasonable" cost.

==== To California from China ====
News of the California Gold Strike arrived in China by the end of 1848. Only a few hundred Chinese traveled to California in 1849, but this turned into a steady flood as travel arrangements were worked out by 1851 and later. The Taiping Revolution in China and the poverty and violence in China induced many Chinese to leave China searching for a way to earn a better living. Most Chinese, like most early California travelers, came to California with the goal of quickly making enough money to pay for their passage and improve their own and their family's status and lifestyle in China after they returned.

Nearly all Chinese immigrants to California were young men with almost no women. Their wives, families and relatives remained in China. The Chinese tended to congregate in heavily male small semi-isolated "China Towns" wherever they settled. One of the primary problems they encountered in California was the acute lack of Chinese women—almost none initially immigrated. This "problem" was somewhat alleviated when recruiters ending up procuring or "buying" Chinese prostitutes and shipping them to the United States. There they went to work in brothels or were "bought" by wealthy Chinese. Some of the more affluent Chinese in California could "buy" a Chinese mistress for about $300 to $500. The large population, the common condition of extreme poverty in China and the low status of women in China made recruiting or "buying" women for this "profession" fairly easy in China.

Nearly all these Chinese men initially planned to return to China once they had made enough money. About half of the initial Chinese immigrants did return to China where their wives and families lived. Most of the Chinese immigrants booked their passages on ships with the Pacific Mail Steamship Company (founded 1848) or on the American China clippers which often left California empty and looking for a new cargo before returning home. Nearly all Chinese immigrants neither spoke and understood English nor were they familiar with western culture and life. While in the United States they had little incentive to assimilate into the dominant culture or learn anything more than rudimentary English language skills. They did nearly all their business with a few Chinese businessmen that established businesses in California "China Towns". The hostility they experienced from nearly all other cultures in America and their belief that they would return to China often discouraged them from attempting to assimilate.

=== Port of San Francisco ===
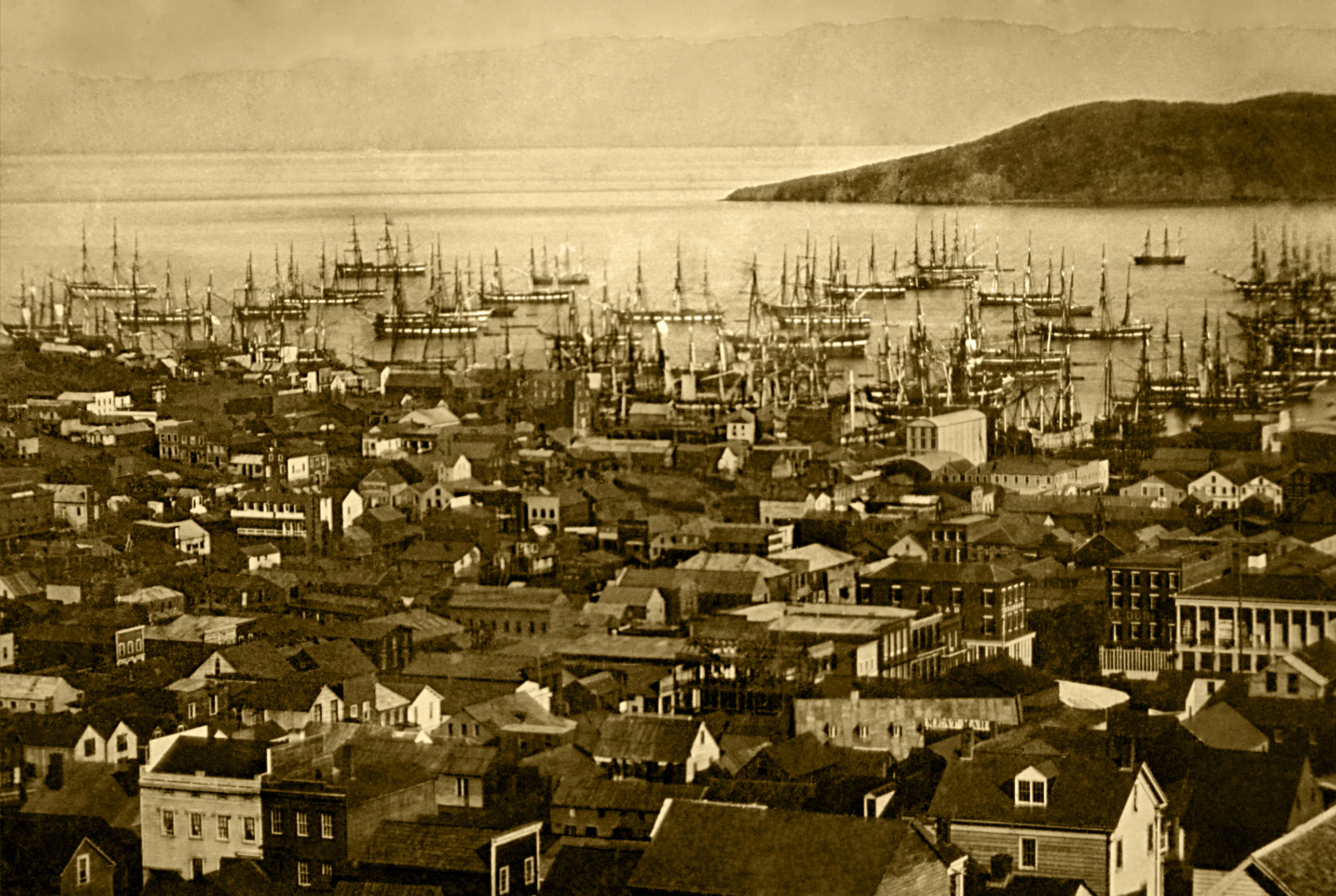
Merchant ships fill San Francisco harbor in 1850 or 1851

The port of San Francisco initially starting out as only a few ramshackle buildings with a population of about 180 in 1846 grew rapidly to several thousand residents only a few years later. San Francisco was the nearest seaport to the gold fields with full access to virtually all ongoing sea traffic and freight shipments. The port of San Francisco boomed and expanded very rapidly to a California state census population of about 32,000 in 1852 (San Francisco—the largest city in the state—U.S. California Census of 1850 was burned in one of the frequent fires in San Francisco). In addition San Francisco had access to the Sacramento–San Joaquin River Delta which gave access to ship traffic going to Sacramento, Stockton and Marysville, California which were all about 120 miles (190 km) closer to the goldfields. Paddle steamers were put in service by late 1849 and provided "easy" transport of passengers and freight to Sacramento, banks, bar rooms, gambling establishments, wharfs, warehouses and other needed buildings were built as rapidly as possible.

There were many Argonauts and companies of Argonauts who foresaw the broad needs and demands of a rapidly increasing and hopefully wealthy population in California. Many Argonauts brought along goods of all descriptions and sizes, from needles to knocked-down steamboats, on which they hoped to sell or operate. Indeed, many immigrants had no intention of panning gold or of digging for it in the mines. They would rather sell goods and go into a business which the new mining community would support. After all, gold was the objective; what did it matter whether the means of attaining it were direct or indirect?

Ships provided almost the only link for new supplies—overland travel was too difficult and took too long. One downside that soon developed in California was the long delay in communication between the east and west coast. It took over 40 days to get a message back to the East Coast of the United States and often over 200–300 days to get new supplies shipped in by sailing ships. Only high priced and lighter and smaller items could take the shorter and quicker paddle steamer route over the Isthmus of Panama, nearly everything else had to travel the approximate 17,000 miles (27,000 km) and over 200-day route all sailing ship route around Cape Horn or the Straits of Magellan. Higher priced, time sensitive goods, were often shipped in the faster clipper sailing ship which could make the trip from New York, Boston, etc. to San Francisco in about 120 days. Goods when they were shipped from the East coast (and Europe) were in shipload quantities when they arrived. This often suppressed the local market for that product and some goods would have to be auctioned off at low prices to pay for freight etc. with little or no profit. Very mixed cargo was typical of early shipments to minimize this problem. Food, liquors and building supplies nearly always be sold at a profit. Some business men thrived in this chaotic environment, many others lost their shirts.

One of the first and urgent products needed was building supplies, food and other consumables. Food supplies could be bought and shipped from local Pacific ports to San Francisco, Sacramento, etc. Soon ships were going to and from Oregon, Hawaii, Mexico, Valparaíso Chile, etc. to get food and building supplies that could be shipped back to San Francisco. Building supplies, including complete houses, bricks, etc. were shipped from many East Coast ports as well as Britain, etc.--these shipments were seldom time sensitive as to value. Fairly quickly sawmills were operating in Northern California and Oregon to provide lumber and other wood products. San Francisco shipping boomed and wharves and piers had to be developed to handle the onslaught of cargo--Long Wharf was probably the most prominent. Farmers, laborers, business men, prospective miners, gamblers, 'entertainers' and prostitutes, etc. from around the world flocked to San Francisco.

The few Californio ranchers already living in California initially prospered as the sudden increase in the demand for meat drove up the price paid for livestock. Prices zoomed from the about $2.00 they received for a hide to about $30.00-$40.00 per cow when sold for meat. Initially most of the Californios prospered. Taxes, mortgages, squatters and the cost of proving ownership of their enormous land holdings they had got nearly free from the Indians combined with droughts that seriously decreased the size of their herds led many of the about 500 Californio ranch owners to lose some or all of their enormous land holdings within a few years.

Later, these food shipments from foreign sources changed mainly to shipments from Oregon and internal shipments in California as agriculture was developed in both states. Food like molasses, flour, oysters, hams, barrels of salted meat, rice, coffee, tea, eggs (from Mexico); cheese, sugar, coffee, potatoes, onions, limes, coconuts, raisins, almonds. Some of the goods that were imported by ship included liquor: absinthe, alcohol, ale, beer, whiskey, cognac, cider, champagne, wine, sherry, brandy, claret. Tools like shovels, picks and gold balances. Consumables like cigars, cards, candles; clothing: boots, shoes, underwear; pants, shirts, etc. Fruit like bananas, oranges, and lemons. Lumber from Oregon and other parts of the U.S. and England (500,000 board feet of lumber and 500,000 bricks from Bath, England in one ship's cargo). Building materials like nails, bricks, linseed oil, shingles, windows, stoves, lumber, etc.. Miscellaneous items like furniture, wagons, carts, fishing boats, steam engines, etc. Coal that was needed to power the steam ships. Livestock like hogs, cows, horses, sheep, chickens, etc. Completed knocked down houses both metal and wooden. Some ships carried mostly mail and passengers. Almost anything could eventually be bought at some price. As time went on many or indeed most of these supplies were grown or made locally; but some specialized items were nearly always cheaper to import on ships—still true today.

San Francisco was designated the official port of entry for all California ports where U.S. Customs (also called tariffs and ad valorem taxs) (averaging about 25%) were collected by the Collector of customs from all ships bearing foreign goods. The first Collector of customs was Edward H. Harrison appointed by General Kearny. Shipping boomed from the average of about 25 vessels from 1825 to 1847 to about 793 ships in 1849 and 803 ships in 1850. All ships were inspected for what goods they carried to collect the appropriate customs. Passengers disembarking in San Francisco had one of the easier accesses to the gold country since they could from San Francisco take a paddle wheel steamer, after 1849, to Sacramento and several other towns.

Starting in 1849 many of the ship crews jumped ship and headed for the gold fields when they reached port. Soon San Francisco Bay had many hundreds of abandoned ships anchored off shore. The better ships were re-crewed and put back in the shipping and passenger business. Others were bought cheap and hauled up on the mud flats and used as store ships, saloons, temporary stores, floating warehouses, homes and a number of other uses. Many of these re-purposed ships were partially destroyed in one of San Francisco's many fires and ended up as landfill to expand the available land. The population of San Francisco exploded from about 200 in 1846 to 36,000 in the 1852 California Census. Unfortunately, the 1850 U.S. Census of San Francisco was burned in one of its frequent fires.

In San Francisco initially many people were housed in wooden houses, ships hauled up on the mud flats to serve as homes or businesses, wood-framed canvas tents used for saloons, hotels and boarding houses as well as other flammable structures. Lighting and heat were provided by burning oil lamps or open fires. All these canvas and wood structures housing fires, lanterns and candles combined with a lot of drunken gamblers and miners led almost inevitably to many fires. Most of San Francisco burned down six times in six 'Great Fires' between 1849 and 1852.

== California fisheries ==
=== Native fisheries ===
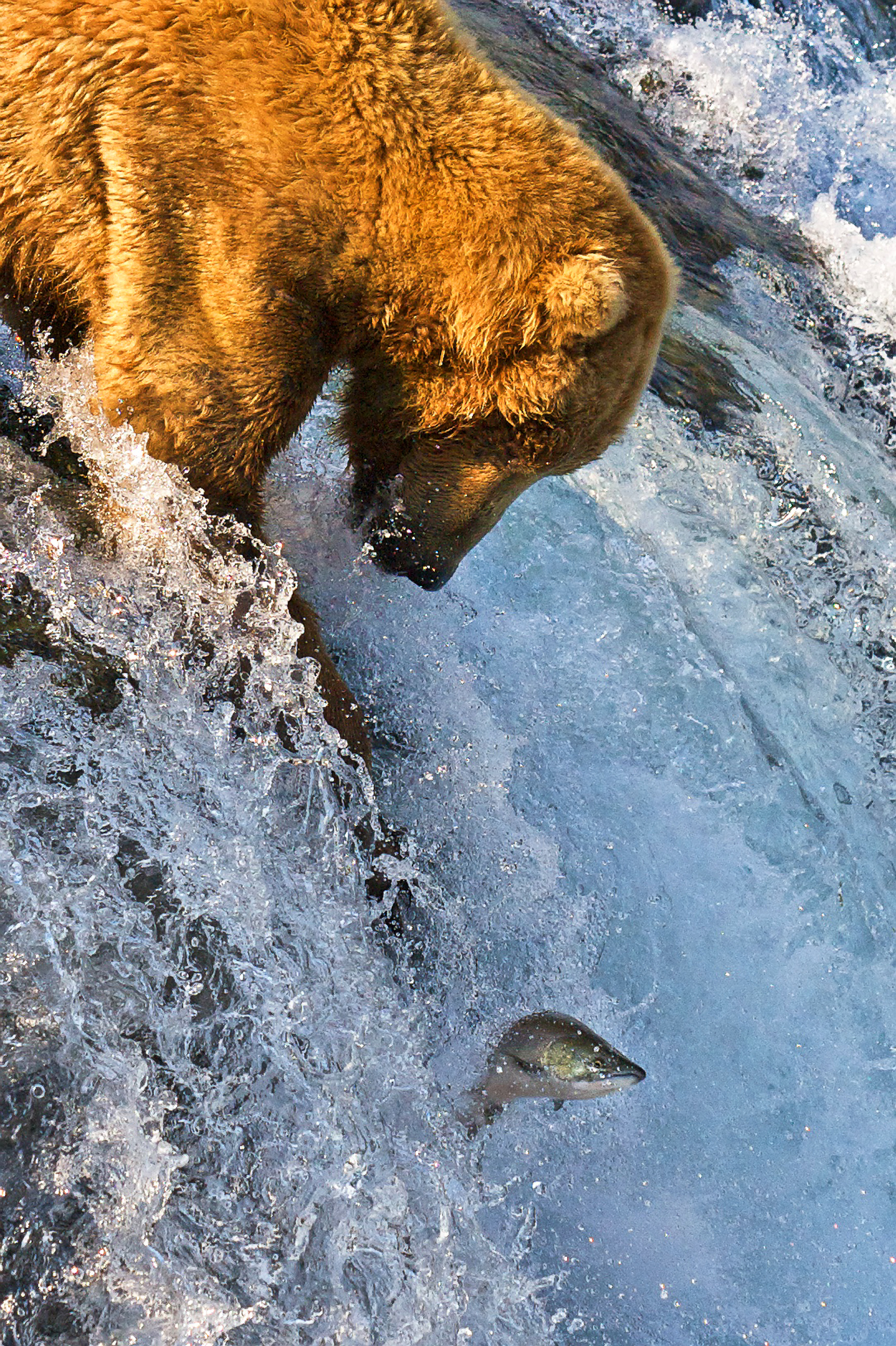
Grizzly bear fishing for salmon at Brooks Falls, Alaska.

California has had an extensive fishery since it was discovered over 10,000 years ago. The Native American inhabitants of California, nearly all hunter-gatherers, harvested many types of fish and shellfish as a regular and often major component of their diet. Several varieties of salmon and steelhead were some of the mainstays of the California Indians.

Indians living in the Northwest coast of California moved and fished along the rivers and California coastal waters using dugout canoes. Their dugout canoes were laboriously made using fire and Stone Age tools out of large trees—usually redwoods.

Salmon spawned in most rivers and streams in California sometime during the year and were a welcome addition to the diet of the hunter-gatherer California people living near almost all the streams. Many tribes migrated to a given area along the streams during spawning runs to harvest the fish. Fish were caught with spears, harpoons, fish nets, fish traps (fishing weirs), hooks and fishing lines, gathering seafood by hand and using specific plant toxins (soaproot, buckeye nuts, and wild cucumber root) to temporarily paralyze the fish so they would float to the surface where could easily be captured. About the only early competitors for fish was the California grizzly bears who lived in California then and who also liked salmon. Salmon and other fish were usually eaten almost immediately, smoked or sun dried and stored in woven baskets so they could not spoil and were available to eat nearly year-round. Acorns gathered each fall were the other staple of most California Indian's diet,

The Chumash people and Tongva people used sewen plank canoes (Tomols) to travel across and fish in the seas between the Southwest California Coast and the Channel Islands of California. Some of their chief catches were sardines (pilchards) who were mentioned several times by the early Spanish explorers. Sardines are small epipelagic fish (surface water fish to 200m) which then migrated along the California coast in large schools at certain times of the year. They are an important forage fish for larger forms of marine life and a major fishery in the California waters till the sardine schools greatly diminished due to ocean current temperature changes and over fishing. The sardines were caught by the California Indians primarily with some kind of net.

The Native Americans in the San Francisco Bay constructed the Emeryville Shellmound and over 400 other shellmounds made up of inedible shellfish shells from millions of meals consumed at or near the shellmound sites. The size of these mounds indicate that they had to have accumulated over hundreds if not thousands of years and indicate a well used and stable food resource. The inedible shells they threw aside from their catches of shellfish eventually covered some hundreds of thousands of square feet, sometimes tens of feet thick. Most of the shells are from oysters (Ostrea lurida) which occurred in large oyster reefs throughout the San Francisco Bay area. How they are harvested is unknown but may have been by hand or by using oyster rakes. Tule (Schoenoplectus acutus) canoes were often used for fishing, moving between shell beds, hunting and fishing sites in the Bay area and the extensive Sacramento–San Joaquin River Delta.

=== Modern fisheries ===
During the Spanish colonization and Mexican periods there are no known fisheries developed. Indeed, they probably contracted as the Chumash people and Tongva people were enticed to move to the Spanish Missions of California and their movement and populations rapidly decreased.

During the California Gold Rush there were many new immigrants who were familiar with fishing. There was a large demand for fresh food including fresh fish and shellfish among the rapidly increasing California population. Providing fresh food products were one of the most wanted and lucrative trades that developed among the California Argonauts. The small Californio population before the rush were only able to provide some beef—their main "product" before 1850 had been cowhides and tallow. After the California Gold Rush started developing a market for fresh fish, many Azorean-Portuguese turned from gold mining to fishing. Fisherman established several small fishing communities up and down the California coast selling fish in towns and cities from San Diego to Eureka. They built their own small fishing boats using the traditional "lateen" sail technology common in the Mediterranean on their fishing boats.

After the gold rush started and Chinese immigrants appeared some of the first "modern" fishermen in California who started fishing in about 1853. The Chinese were using sampans built in California to fish for squid, abalone and fish on Monterey Bay. The Chinese, who came from the coastal Canton region of South China Sea, were able to export roughly two hundred to eight hundred pounds of fresh fish to San Francisco every day or one hundred tons per year. The Chinese later specialized in squid fishing at night for their Asian markets.

In 1899, the sardine fishery collapsed in Italy, energizing the Italian fishermen's immigration to California's fishing villages. The same year, the first sardine cannery in San Francisco Bay was built. Sardines, at this time, existed in large schools of millions of fish migrating each year up the California coast to spawn.

Fishing technology at Monterey prior to 1905 was archaic and inefficient; the canning process was equally crude. The unsightliness, odor, and processing waste from harbor canneries dictated that all future canneries would have to locate away from any business or residential district. To catch more fish the fishermen turned to the more efficient lampara fish net used in Sicily. The lampara net is set around a school of fish and when both ends are retrieved the vessel tows the net forward, closing the bottom and then top of the net while it scoops up much of the school of fish. By 1912 70,000 cases of sardines were shipped.

Other techniques were developed for "reducing" fish heads, tails, guts and skin into meal that could be processed into fertilizer and livestock feed. "Reduction" was cheap because it didn't require much labor, and the market for fishmeal was unlimited. Monterey became a cannery town. About 70% of all sardines were ground up and used as fertilizer and livestock feed with only about 30% canned for human consumption. The yield of sardines landed in California was about 500,000 tons in 1940 down to only 53 tons in 1953.

In 1940 sardines were the most valuable fishing stock in the state. As the temperature of the ocean dropped the migrating sardine schools largely disappeared after 1950 from California waters and nearly all the canneries shut down. The ocean temperature has an irregular cycle called the Pacific decadal oscillation turned water temperatures colder in the mid-1940s, driving sardines southward and intensifying the pressures brought on by overfishing. As the ocean temperatures are cycling higher now there is some evidence that the sardines are starting to return.

Today the Monterey Bay Aquarium, displaying many types of marine life, is located on the former site of a sardine cannery on Cannery Row off the Pacific Ocean shoreline in Monterey. The Monterey Bay National Marine Sanctuary (MBNMS) is a U.S. Federally protected marine area offshore of California's central coast around Monterey Bay.

One of the more unusual developments in the exploitation of natural resources was the market for fresh eggs during the Gold Rush leading people to take small boats to the Farallon Islands to collect wild bird eggs. They sometimes collected up to 500,000 eggs in a year. The Egg War is the name given to an 1863 armed conflict between rival egging companies on the Farallon Islands, 25 miles west of San Francisco.

Early steam powered seine netter

The fishing vessels first used were powered by wind and oars. Since "modern" fishing in California was developed after 1850 (at about the same time as steamships) there were soon some steam-powered fishing vessels being used for longer-distance fishing in bigger boats. The steam was used both for propulsion and also for winching in nets, unloading catches, lifting and lowering anchors etc. As the diesel engines and petrol engines (gasoline engine) were developed in the early 1900s they were soon the engine of choice. Diesel engines are now the engine of choice for powering most commercial fishing vessels. Their economical operation and long lifetimes make their higher initial cost normally well worthwhile. Today many smaller and sports boats are powered by an outboard motor consisting of a self-contained unit that includes engine, gearbox and propeller or jet drive, designed to be affixed to the outside of the transom. The outboard motor provides steering control both as a movable rudder and by pivoting over their mountings to control the direction of thrust. Outboard motors have less than one horsepower to over 200 hp and are relatively easy to remove for service or replacement.

Commercial fishing today uses a variety of techniques for fishing. Fishing rods with baited hooks and fishing lines used in various ways are used for fishing for some particular types of fish. Fishing using nets like cast nets, hand nets, drift nets, gillnets, seine nets, trawl nets, surrounding nets etc. of various sizes and construction as well as longline fishing with hundreds of hooks on a line fishing both for bottom and pelagic fish (near surface fish) are the most common devices used to catch high yields of fish. The crab fisheries uses crab pots baited with dead fish to catch crabs.

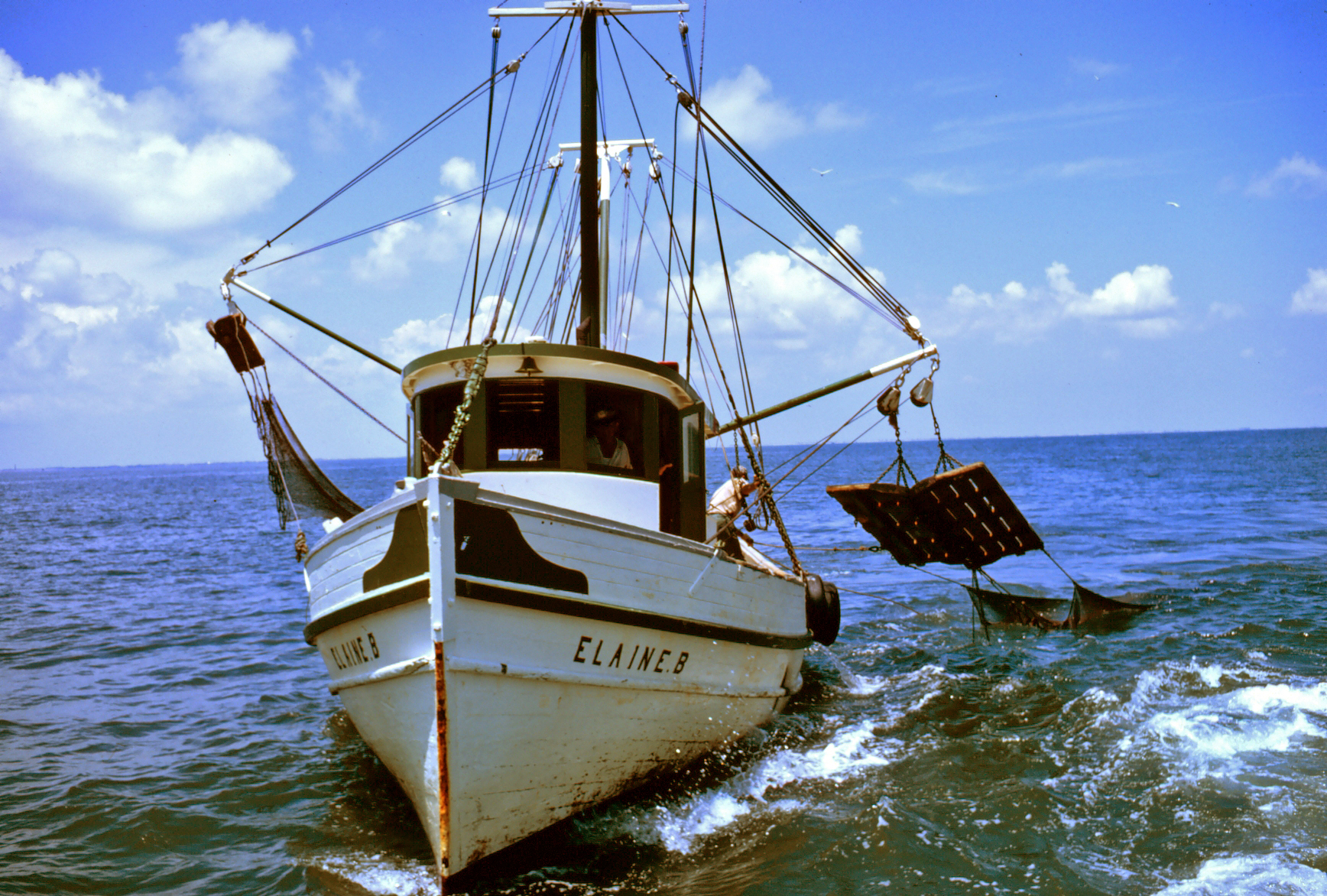
Double-rigged shrimp trawler hauling in the nets.

In some parts of the Pacific Northwest, fishing with baited traps is also common. Common commercial methods for catching shrimp and prawns include bottom trawling, cast nets, seines, shrimp baiting and dip netting. Bottom trawling often tears up the ocean bottom and can be very destructive to all bottom dwelling fish. Trawling involves the use of a system of nets deployed on or near the sea floor. Benthic trawling is towing or dragging a net at the very bottom of the ocean. Demersal trawling is towing a net just above the benthic zone. Midwater trawling (pelagic trawling) is trawling, or net fishing nearer the surface of the ocean.

For some applications a fish trap is used. Fish traps or fishing weirs restricts the flow of fish so that they are directed into a trap. The fish stay alive until they are removed and these techniques can be used to free some types of fish that are preferentially not caught. Today elaborate fishing trawlers, etc. are all examples of the fishing techniques used today. To keep the caught fish fresh they are often kept in refrigerated holds or packed in ice.

As is typical worldwide of public owned resources, unlimited fishing has led to severe overfishing for some fisheries. In response to this quotas, catch limits, closed and open seasons and other regulations had to be set in place to control the who, when, how and where questions of fishing. In 1851—California enacted a law concerning oysters and oyster beds. In 1852 the first regulation of salmon fishing occurred when fishing weirs or stream fish obstructions were prohibited and closed seasons established. In 1870 California Board of Fish Commissioners, predecessor to the California Department of Fish and Game was established. In 1870 the eastern oyster (Crassostrea virginica) was introduced, in 1871 shad, in 1874 Catfish and in 1879 striped bass were all introduced to California waters. California has about 4,000 lakes and 37,000 miles (60,000 km) of streams and canals suitable for game fish. To help fish get around dams fish ladders are constructed to allow them to pass on upstream for spawning etc. To preserve, protect and enhance existing fishing the California Department of Fish and Game (DFG) tries to keep all fishing laws enforced. The 720 properties managed by the DFG are: 110 wildlife areas, 130 ecological reserves, 11 marine reserves, 159 public access areas, 21 fish hatcheries and 289 other types of properties. To help keep California waters stocked with fish in 1870 the first California fish hatcheries were built—mostly trout hatcheries. Today (2011) there are eight salmon and steelhead hatcheries and 13 trout hatcheries. Though hatcheries may help some fishing stocks they are no panacea to counteract overfishing, habitat destruction, stream restrictions, water diversions, etc.

See: Monterey Bay National Marine Sanctuary link to get a list and links to other protected marine preserves in California.

The major types of sport and commercial fish and shellfish now found in California waters are: Abalone, Albacore tuna, Anchovy, Barracuda, Surfperch, Billfishes, Bluefin tuna, Bonito, Cabezone, California halibut, Carp, Catfish, Clams, California corbina, Crabs, Crappie, Croaker, Dungeness crab, Eels, Flounder, Flying fish, Giant sea bass, Greenling, Groundfish (includes Rockfish species), Grouper, Grunion, Halibut, Hardhead, Herring, Hake, Jack mackerel, Kelp Bass, Largemouth bass, Lingcod, Mackerel, Oysters, Pacific shrimp, Perch, Pikeminnow (Squawfish), Prawn, Rock crab, Sablefish, Sacramento blackfish, Salmon, Sardine, Scallops, Scorpionfish, Shark, California sheephead, skate, Shortspine thornyhead, Skipjack tuna, Smallmouth bass, Smelts, Sole, Spider or Sheep crab, Splittail, Spiny lobster, Squid, Steelhead, Striped bass, Sturgeon, Surfperch, Swordfish, Turbot, Trout, Whitefish, Whiting, and the Yellowtail fish.

See: NOAA Long list of California fish for more specific names:

Nearly all fishing is subject to quotas, allowed seasons, licensing, allowed tackle, type and number of lines or net types, excluded (closed) areas, allowed size range, allowed catch size, and other restrictions. The jurisdictions and roles of several state and federal agencies often overlap in the maritime domain giving rise to an alphabet soup of agencies and jurisdictions. Each state normally maintains joint jurisdiction over the first 3.4 miles (5.5 km) (3 nautical mile) of their coastal waters. The main agency charged with ensuring deep sea fishing regulations and restrictions in the United States exclusive economic zone (EEZ) of 227 miles (365 km) (200 nautical miles) off its shores are enforced on the high seas by the United States Coast Guard.

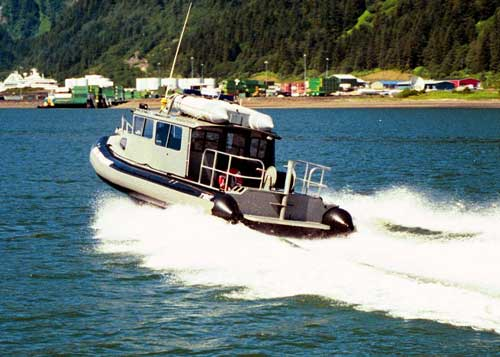
One of the NOAA OLE's few patrol craft

The National Oceanic and Atmospheric Administration (NOAA) agency within the United States Department of Commerce is charged with protecting and preserving the nation's living marine resources through scientific research, fisheries management, enforcement and habitat conservation. The National Oceanic and Atmospheric Administration Fisheries Office of Law Enforcement (NOAA OLE) tries to enforce the about 35 laws and regulations passed by Congress. NOAA's Office of Law Enforcement (OLE) is responsible for carrying out more than 35 federal statutes and regulations. The agency's jurisdiction spans more than 11,500,000 square kilometres (4,400,000 sq mi)s ocean in the U.S.'s exclusive economic zone (EEZ) spread over more than 85,000 miles (137,000 km) of U.S. coastline and the country's 13 National Marine Sanctuaries and its Marine National Monuments. It and the United States Coast Guard are also responsible for enforcing U.S. treaties and international law governing the high seas and international trade.

With such a large coverage area, it's no wonder that NOAA's Office of Law Enforcement operates joint enforcement agreements with 27 coastal states and partners with other agencies to help get the job done. Article III, Section 2 of the United States Constitution grants original jurisdiction to U.S. federal courts over admiralty and maritime matters, however that jurisdiction is not exclusive and most maritime cases can be heard in either state or federal courts under the "saving to suitors" clause. NOAA OLE and NOAA Fisheries works within the laws as enacted in the Magnuson-Stevens Act, the Lacey Act Amendments of 1981, the Marine Mammal Protection Act, the National Marine Sanctuaries Act and the Endangered Species Act. NOAA's Office of Law Enforcement now has 146 special agents and 17 enforcement officers working out of six divisional offices and 52 field offices throughout the United States and U.S. territories. Many have criticized this meager manpower as grossly inadequate.

Overfishing is one of the main problems with many marine fisheries with about 30% of all marine fisheries thought to be over fished. Inadequate data is one of the main restrictions to finding and instituting reasonable and sustainable limits on many fishing stocks. To control overfishing NOAA has instituted the National Marine Fisheries Service (NMFS) to set quotas, specify open and closed fisheries and seasons and other limits on what, when and how fish are caught within federal guidelines. With the help of the six regional science centers, eight regional fisheries management councils, the coastal states and territories, and three interstate fisheries management commissions, These councils have had varying amounts of success, but seem to at least have started the rehabilitation of some fisheries. United States Fish and Wildlife Service National Fish Passage Program tries to remove barriers blocking the natural migration of fish to historic habitat used for reproduction and growth.

Since fisheries are the mainstay of some communities as well as being a $38 billion industry there are many conflicting pressures on controlling fishing. More data gathered by more people on: bycatch (caught but unusable fish), fish life cycles, fish habitats at different parts of their life cycle, destructive fish harvesting methods, least damaging ways to harvest fish, etc. are needed to make reasonable choices and set quotas, seasons, etc. necessary to preserve our fisheries. All of this should be set with a maximum of scientific and a minimum of political input. With today's increasingly efficient fishing techniques and fleets, necessary restrictions are the only thing that will assure a continuing source of fishing related jobs and fish products for our descendants—being responsible stewards of our natural resources is often a difficult job but one we can learn and implement.

== California Naval Bases ==
=== Mare Island ===
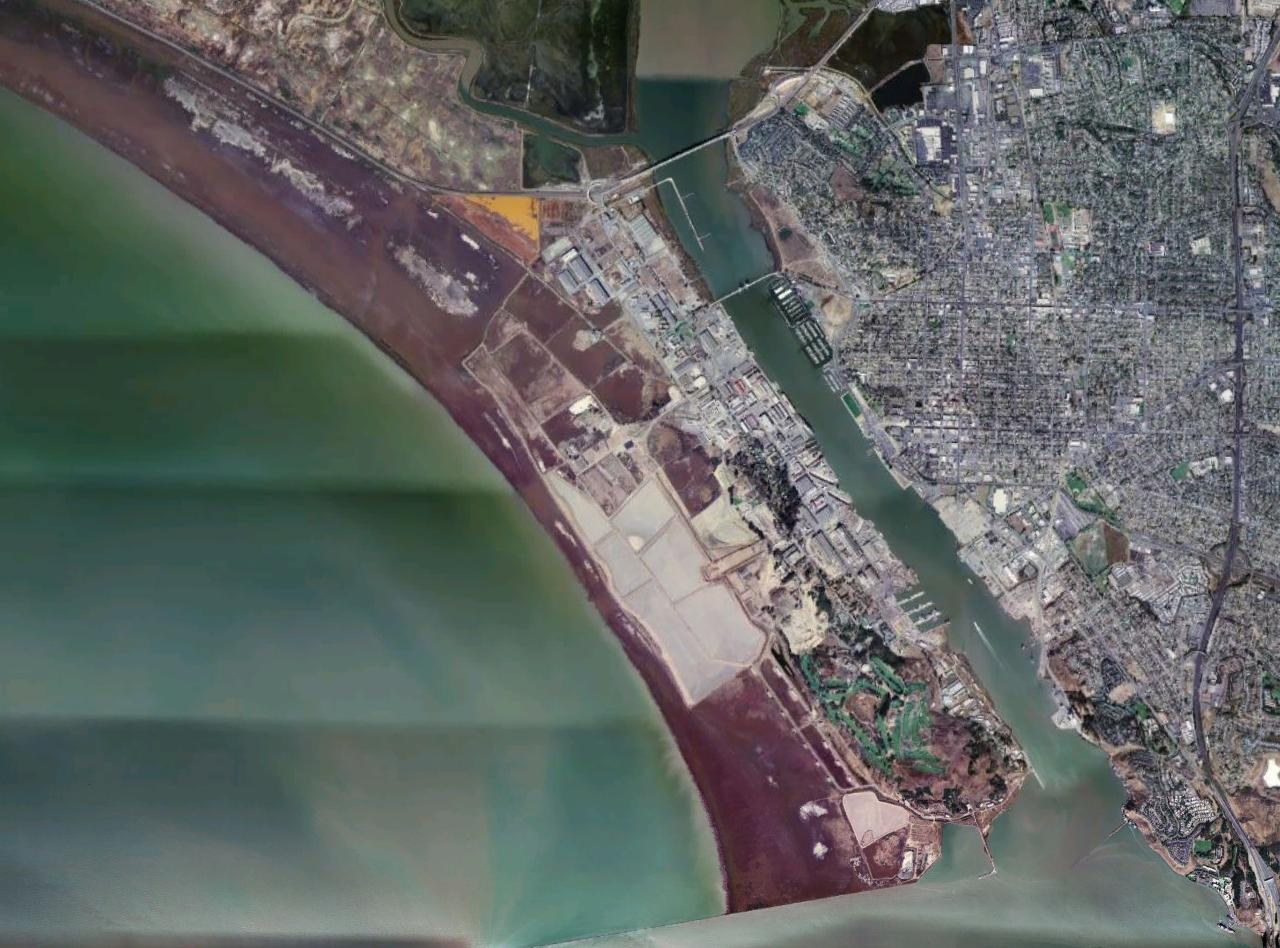
Aerial photo of the southern part of Mare Island.

Mare Island, near the city of Vallejo, California, was first Naval Base in California. The Napa River forms its eastern side as it enters the Carquinez Strait juncture with the east side of San Pablo Bay. In 1850, Commodore John Drake Sloat, in charge of a commission to find a California naval base, recommended the island across the Napa River from the settlement of Vallejo; it being "free from ocean gales and from floods and freshets."

On 6 November 1850, two months after California was admitted to statehood, President Millard Fillmore reserved Mare Island for government use. The U.S. Navy Department acted favorably on Commodore Sloat's recommendations and Mare Island was purchased in July 1852, for the sum of $83,410 for the use as a naval shipyard. Two years later, on 16 September 1854, Mare Island became the first permanent U.S. naval installation on the west coast, with Commodore David G. Farragut, as Mare Island's first base commander. For more than a century, Mare Island served as the United States Navy's Mare Island Naval Shipyard. A 508-foot (155 m) drydock was built by the Public Works Department on an excellent rock foundation of cut granite blocks. The work took nineteen years and was completed in 1891. During the Spanish–American War, a concrete drydock on wooden piles, 740 feet (230 m) long, was completed after eleven years of work, in 1910. By 1941, a third drydock had been completed and the drydock number four was under construction. The ammunitions depot and submarine repair base were modern, fireproof buildings. A million dollar, three-way vehicle causeway to Vallejo was completed.

Before World War II, Mare Island had been in a continual state of upbuilding. By 1941, new projects included improvements to the central power plant, a new pattern storage building, a large foundry, machine shop, magazine building, paint shop, new administration building, and a huge storehouse. The yard was expected to be able to repair and paint six to eight large naval vessels at a time. Several finger piers had recently been built, as well as a new shipbuilding wharf, adding one 500-foot (150 m) and a 750-foot (230 m) berth. It employed 5593 workers at the beginning of 1939, and rapidly increased to 18,500 busily engaged by May 1941, with a monthly payroll of $3,500,000 (1941). Then came Pearl Harbor. In 1941, the drafting department had expanded to three buildings accommodating over 400 Naval architects, engineers and draftsmen. The hospital carried 584 bed patients. Mare Island became one of the U.S. Navy's ship building sites in World War II specializing in building diesel engine powered submarines—they eventually built 32 of them. After the war was over Mare Island became a premier site for building nuclear-powered submarines—building 27 of them.

In 1969, the US Navy transferred its (Vietnam War) Brown Water Navy Riverine Training Forces from Coronado, California, to Mare Island. Swift Boats (Patrol Craft Fast-PCF), and PBRs (Patrol Boat River), among other types of riverine craft, conducted boat operations throughout the currently named Napa-Sonoma Marshes State Wildlife Area, which are located on the north and west portions of Mare Island. Mare Island Naval Base was deactivated during the 1995 cycle of US base closures, but the US Navy Reserves still have access to the water portions of the State Wildlife Area for any riverine warfare training being conducted from their new base in Sacramento, California.

In 1996 Mare Island Naval Shipyard was closed.

=== Naval Base San Diego ===
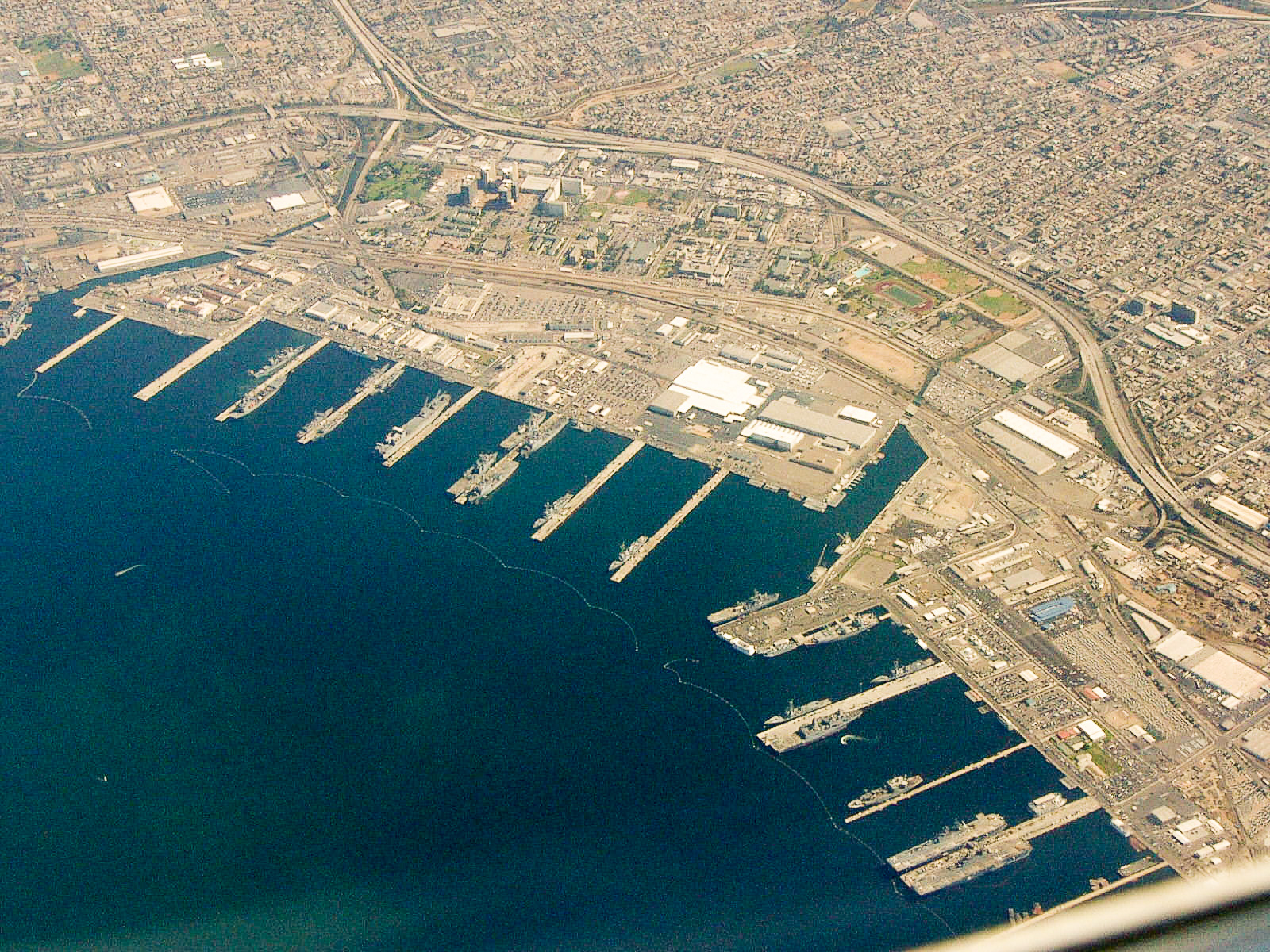
Aerial view of Naval Base San Diego

Naval Base San Diego was started on land acquired in 1920. San Diego has become the home port of the largest naval fleet in the world, and includes two supercarriers, as well as U.S. Marine Corps stations, U.S. Navy ports, and U.S. Coast Guard installations. Naval Base San Diego is the largest base of the United States Navy on the west coast of the United States, in San Diego, California. Naval Base San Diego is the principal homeport of the Pacific Fleet, consisting of 54 ships and over 120 tenant commands. The base is composed of 13 piers stretched over 977 acres (3.95 km^{2}) of land and 326 acres (1.32 km^{2}) of water. The total on base population is 20,000 military personnel and 6,000 civilians.

== California shipbuilding ==
=== California shipbuilders ===
California shipbuilders have built or repaired ships of all types, from battleships to wood sailing ships, from the mid-1850s till today. In both World War I and World War II several large and small shipyards were built in California especially for war time construction. Ships were built out of steel, wood and when these were in short supply even out of concrete. Many of the shipyards built many different types of ships and only the "major" builds are included here—see references for more detail and the names of ships. Shipyards that built only one ship are not included. California during World War II had many ship building yards. California shipyards also built floating dry docks like the Large Auxiliary Floating Dry Docks and Medium Auxiliary Floating Dry Docks.

19th century California shipbuilders
Shipbuilder	Vessel types, notes	California city
Collyer, W. (1875–1877)	Ferry	San Francisco
Dickie Bros (1875–1883)	Cargo ship	Alameda
Dickie, J.W. (1894–1904)	Cargo ship	Alameda
Fulton Eng. & Sbldg 1889	Tug	San Francisco
Hanson & Fraser	Passenger ship	San Francisco
Hay, A. (1887–1890)	Cargo ship	Wilmington
Muller, W.	Tug (1889–1935)	Benicia
Matthew Turner (shipbuilder) Shipyard	Sailing Ships (238 ea.)	Benicia
Union Brass & Iron Works 1849–1907	Now: Bethlehem Steel	San Francisco

California shipbuilders
Shipbuilder	Vessel types, notes	California city	Ref
Ackerman Boat	Tugs, LCM Mark 3	Newport Beach	
Anderson & Cristofani	Minesweepers	San Francisco	
Barrett & Hilp	Concrete ships, barges	South San Francisco	
Basalt Rock Company	Lighter, rescue ship	Napa	
Bendixsen Shipbuilding	Cargo 1876–1910	Fairhaven	
Benicia Shipbuilding	Wooden cargo World War I	Benicia	
Bethlehem, BAE Systems S. F.	Battleship, tug	San Francisco	
Bethlehem San Francisco	Cargo+ 1885–1981	San Francisco	
Bethlehem San Pedro	Destroyers	San Pedro	
Bethlehem Steel, Risdon Iron Works	Union Brass Iron Works 1849–1907	San Francisco	
Bethlehem, BAE Systems San Diego	Minesweepers	San Diego	
Campbell Industries	Tuna boats, minesweeper	San Diego	
Chandler, Ralph J.	Cargo 1917–1919	Wilmington	
Colberg Boat Works	Minesweepers	Stockton	
Concrete Ship Constructors	Concrete ships & barges	National City	
Consolidated Steel	Small cargo	Wilmington	
Craig Shipbuilding	Subs 1917, Cargo 1931	Long Beach	
Cryer & Sons	Transport 1942	Oakland	
Eureka Shipbuilding	Diesel tugs	Eureka	
Fellows & Stewart	Sub chaser, tug, ARB	Wilmington	
Fulton Shipyard	Minesweepers	Antioch	
General Dynamics NASSCO	Cargo, tug	San Diego	
General Engineering	Minesweepers	Alameda	
Hammond Lumber	Cargo (1917–1919)	Humboldt Bay	
Hanlon Dry Dock & Shipbuilding	Cargo (1910–1927)	Oakland	
Harbor Boatbuilding	Minesweepers	Terminal Island	
Hickinbotham Brothers	Tank landing barge	Stockton	
Hodgson-Greene-Haldeman	Tug, barge	Long Beach	
Kaiser Richmond No. 1 Yard	Oceans, Libertys, Victorys	Richmond	
Kaiser Richmond No. 2 Yard	Libertys, Victorys	Richmond	
Kaiser Richmond No. 3 Yard	Libertys, Victorys	Richmond	
Kaiser Richmond No. 4 Yard	Oilers, LSTs	Richmond	
Kaiser, California Shipbuilding	Liberty, Victory	Los Angeles	
Kneass, G. W.	Fishing, Sub chaser	San Francisco	
Kyle & Co.	Tankers, Barge	Stockton	
Al Larson Boat Shop	Fishing, sub chaser	San Pedro	
Long Beach Shipbuilding	World War I, cargo World War II	Long Beach	
Los Angeles Shipbuilding	Cargo	San Pedro	
Lynch Shipbuilding	Tug, cargo	San Diego	
Mare Island Naval Shipyard	Navy shipyard	Vallejo	
Marinship	Libertys	Sausalito	
Moore Dry Dock Company	Cargo	Oakland	
NASSCO	Fishing, LSTs	San Diego	
Pacific Bridge Company	Coastal cargo	San Francisco	
Pacific Coast Engineering (PACECO)	Tug, barge	Alameda	
Pacific Coast Shipbuilding	Cargo (1919–1920)	Bay Point	
Peyton Company	Sub chaser, tug	Newport Beach	
Pollock-Stockton Shipbuilding	Barge, lighter, floating drydocks	Stockton	
Rolph Shipbuilding	Cargo (1917–1921)	Fairhaven	
San Diego Marine	Minesweepers	San Diego	
San Francisco Naval Shipyard	Hunter's Point	San Francisco	
South Coast Shipbuilding	Minesweepers	Newport Beach	
Southwestern Shipbuilding	Destroyers	San Pedro	
Standard Shipbuilding	Wooden ships, barges (1910–1921)	San Pedro	
Stephens Marine	Barge, lighter	Stockton	
Stone & Sons, William F.	Founded 1853	Oakland	
Todd San Pedro	Cargo ship	San Pedro	
Union Brass & Iron Works	See: Bethleham Steel	San Francisco	
Union Construction	World War I cargo	Oakland	
Van Peer Boat Works	Fishing 1978–2012	Fort Bragg	
Victory Shipbuilding	Tugs, U.S. Army & Navy	Newport Beach	
Western Pipe & Steel	World War I & II cargo ships	South San Francisco, San Pedro	
Wilmington Boat Works	Sub chaser, tug	Wilmington	
Clyde W. Wood	Barge, tugs	Stockton	

Peacetime construction by small Pacific Coast yards
Shipbuilder	Vessel types, notes	California city
Bay City Marine	Icebreaking tug	San Diego
Berggren Marine	Fishing	Chula Vista
DeYoung, A. W.	Patrol boat	Alameda
Bob Pluss Welding	Fishing 1980+	Chula Vista
Calaska Marine C	Fishing	Marshall
Coombs, Walter D.	Tug	Los Angeles
Fashion Blacksmith, Inc.	Fishing	Crescent City
Guntert & Zimmerman	Derrick barge	Stockton
J. & R. Dooley Boat Builders	Fishing	Half Moon Bay
Kaiser Cargo, Inc.	Drill ship	Richmond
Kelley Boat Works	Fishing	Fort Bragg
Mitchel Duane Phares	Fishing	Los Angeles
Muller, William	Tug (1889–1935)	Wilmington
Richmond Steel	Covered lighter	Richmond
San Pedro Boatworks	Patrol boat	San Pedro
SWATH Ocean Systems, LLC	Research vessel	Chula Vista
Transval Electronics Co.	Fishing	El Segundo
Wilmington Shipbuilding	Steam schooner	Wilmington

Wartime construction by small Pacific Coast yards
Shipbuilder	Vessel types, notes	California city
Aetna Iron & Steel	Sludge barge	San Diego
American Pipe	Covered lighter	South Gate
California Steel	Fuel oil barge	Richmond
Garbutt-Walsh Inc.	Covered lighter	San Pedro
Hunt Marine Service	Tug	Richmond
Independent Iron Works	Open lighter	Oakland
Madden, Lewis	Tug	Sausalito
Moore Equipment	Covered lighter	Stockton
Pacific Boat	Barge, deck	Terminal Island
Sacramento SB	Open lighter	Sacramento
Sausalito Shipbuilding	Barge, gasoline	Sausalito
Soule Steel	Lighter	San Francisco
Standard Steel	Barge, deck	Los Angeles
Stanwood Shipyard	Barge	Stanwood
United Concrete Pipe	Coastal freighter	Los Angeles
Wilson Co.	Army launches	Wilmington

=== Mare Island Naval Shipyard ===
Mare Island Naval Shipyard (MINS) in Vallejo, California, was the premier naval construction site for Navy ships on the West Coast of the United States from about 1855 to 1993.

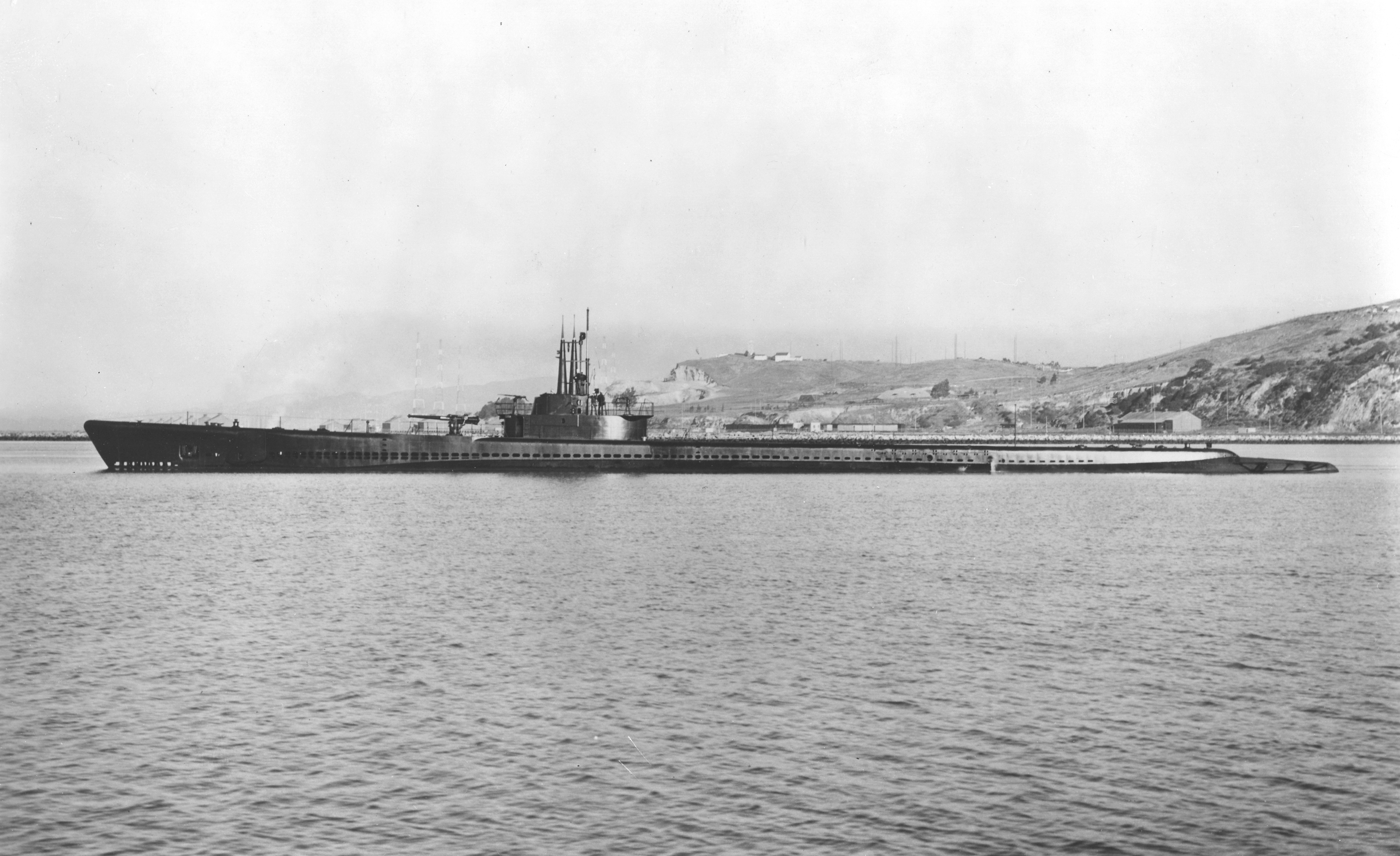
USS Tang off Mare Island in 1943.

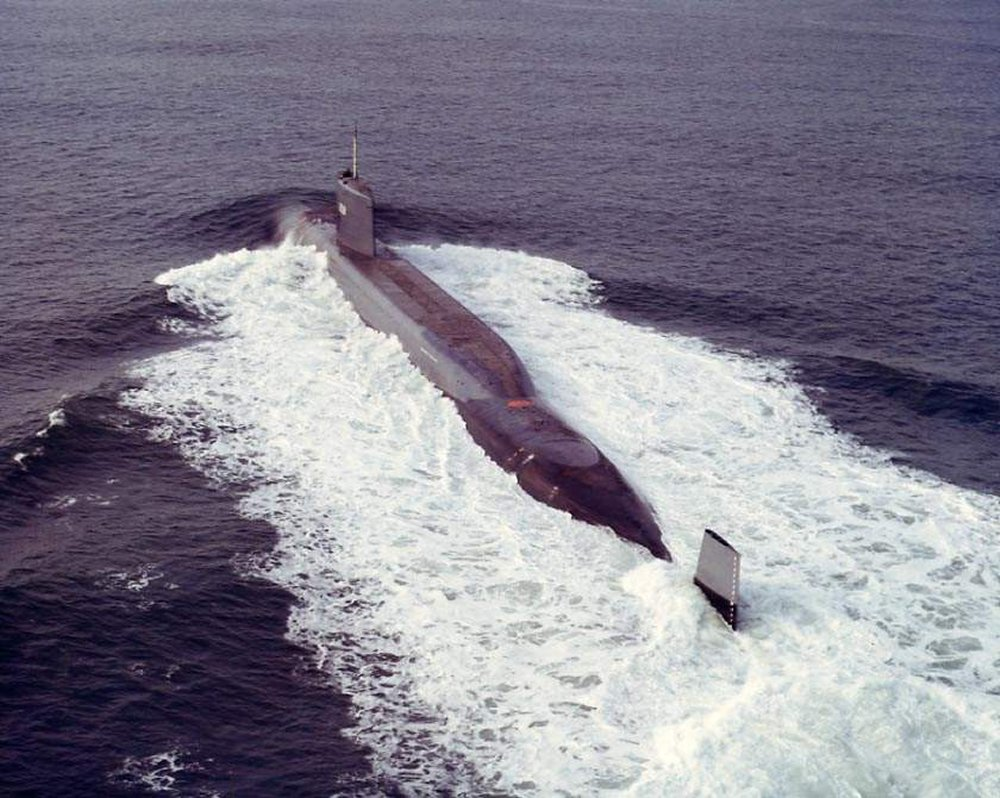
UGM-27 Polaris ballistic missile submarine USS Mariano G. Vallejo.

Before World War II, Mare Island had been in a continual state of build up. By 1941, the yard was expected to be able to repair and paint six to eight large naval vessels at a time. It employed 5593 workers at the beginning of 1939 which rapidly increased to 18,500 by May 1941, with a monthly payroll of $3,500,000(1941). Then came the attack on Pearl Harbor. During World War II, Mare Island specialized in building up the US Navy's submarine forces in the Pacific as well as building other Naval ships.

When Congress ordered Mare Island closed down in 1993, the shipyard employed 5,800 workers.

Mare Island Naval Shipyard constructed at least eighty-nine seagoing vessels for the United States Navy—including two for the Revenue Cutter Service. Among the more important ships & boats built were: Mare Island Construction

- 2 Wood sloop-of-war
- 1 iron monitor
- 1 revenue cutter (USRC)
- 1 harbor tug boat for the Revenue Cutter Service
- 1 training ship
- 1 collier
- 1 aircraft carrier
- 3 tankers
- 2 gunboats
- 19 destroyers
- 15 submarine chasers – wood
- 1 cruiser
- 1 heavy cruiser
- 2 battleships
- 2 submarine tenders
- 32 Diesel powered submarines
- 17 Nuclear-powered submarines
- 1 Bathyscaphe Trieste II

See: Mare Island Naval Shipyard for specific ships.

=== National Steel and Shipbuilding Company ===
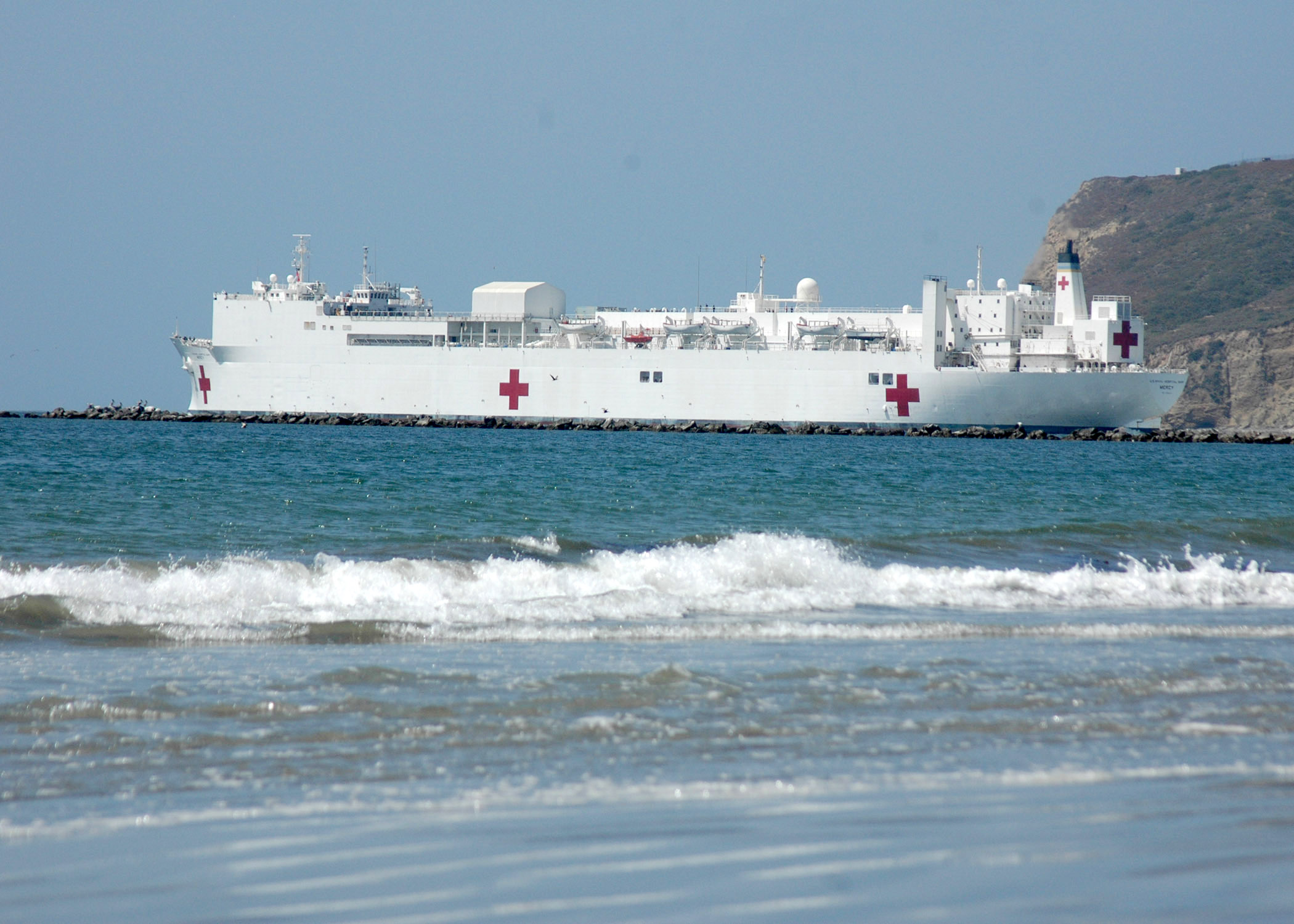
Hospital ship Mercy leaving San Diego in May 2008.

National Steel and Shipbuilding Company, commonly referred to as NASSCO, is a shipyard in San Diego, and a division of General Dynamics. It is located next to the San Diego Naval base. What became NASSCO was founded as a small machine shop called California Iron Works (CIW) in 1905. The machine shop and foundry were renamed National Iron Works (NIW) in 1922 and moved to the San Diego waterfront to build ships in 1944–1945. In 1949 NIW was renamed National Steel and Shipbuilding Corporation (NASSCO).

The shipyard specializes in maintaining and constructing commercial cargo ships and auxiliary vessels such as minesweepers and LSTs, hospital ships, patrol craft, and cargo vessels for the US Navy and the Military Sealift Command. It is the largest new construction shipyard on the West Coast of the United States employing more than 4,600 people and is now the only major ship construction yard on the West Coast of the United States.

See Category:Ships built in San Diego for write-ups on 70 ships built there.

=== California Shipbuilding Corporation ===
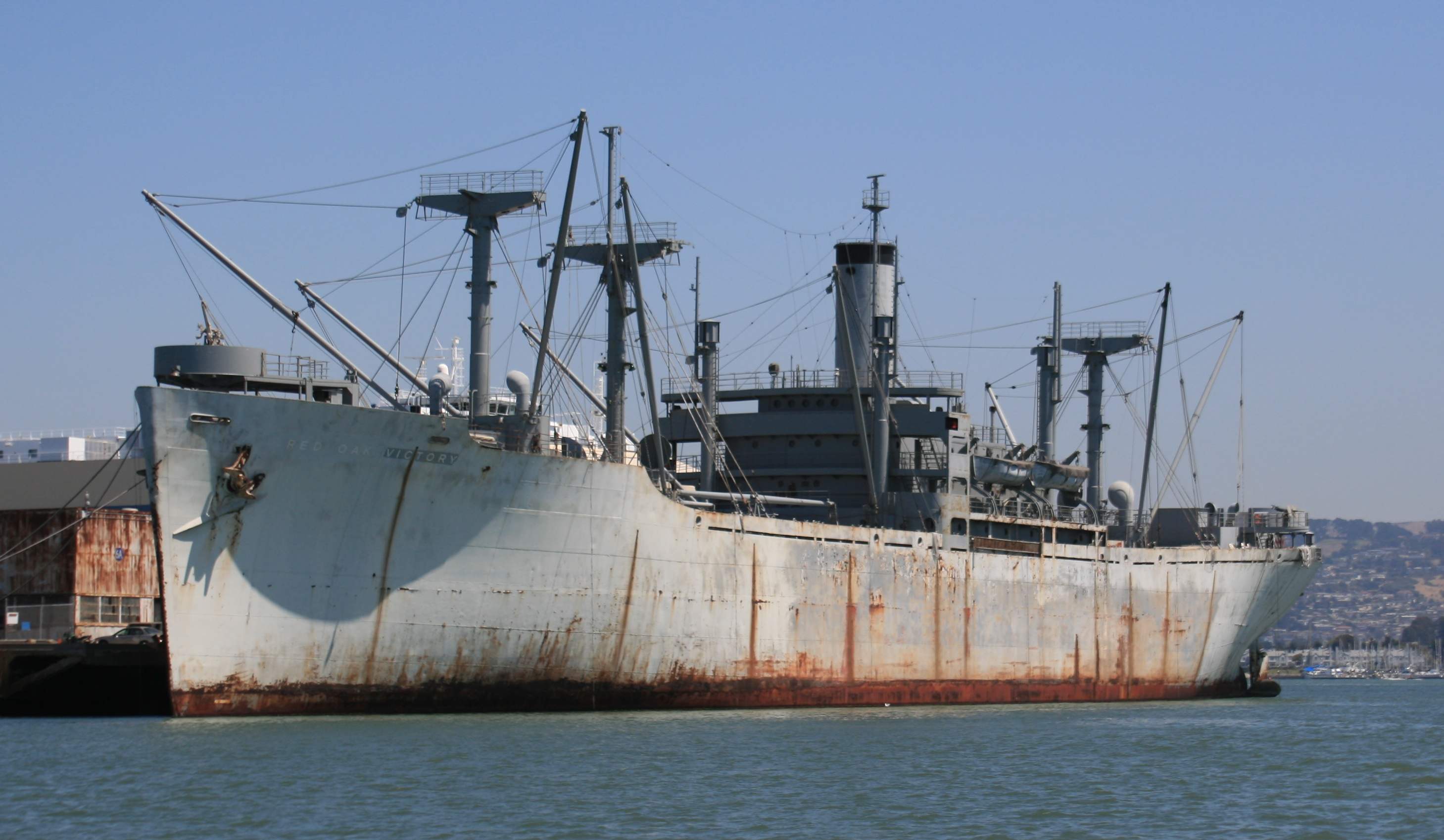
Victory ship SS Red Oak Victory (AK-235), now a museum ship.

.

California Shipbuilding Corporation (often called Calship) built 467 Liberty and Victory ships during World War II, including Haskell-class attack transports. The Calship shipyard was created at Terminal Island in Los Angeles as part of the World War II shipbuilding effort. It was initially 8 ways, and increased to 14. After the war, it was liquidated. The ships they built were:

- 306 EC2-S-C1 Liberty ship cargo transport
- 30 Z-ET1-S-C3 Liberty ship tanker *
- 32 VC2-S-AP3 Victory ship cargo transport, 8,500 hp
- 30 VC2-S-AP5 Haskell class USN attack transport
- 69 VC2-S-AP2 Victory ship cargo transport, 6,000 hp

=== Kaiser-Permanente California shipyards ===
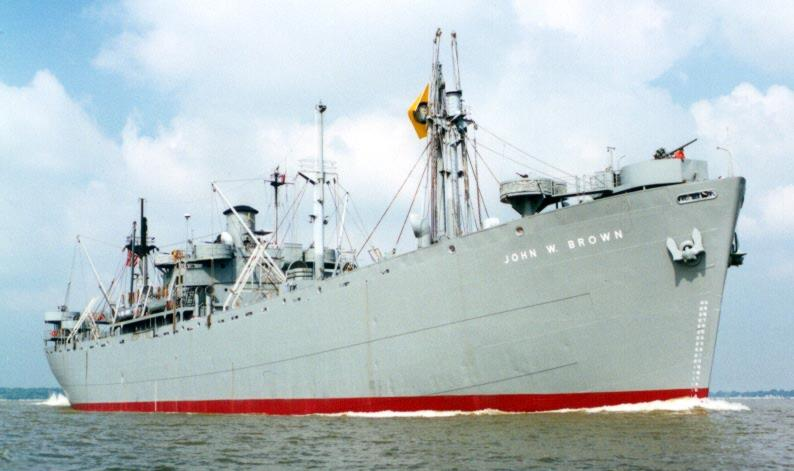
SS John W. Brown is one of only two surviving operational Liberty ships.

Kaiser Richmond Shipyards, Richmond, California (a Kaiser facility) had four Richmond Shipyards, located in the city of Richmond, California and another shipyard in Los Angeles. Kaiser had still other yards in Washington (state) and other states. They were run by Kaiser-Permanente Metals and Kaiser Shipyards. The Richmond yards were responsible for constructing more Liberty ships during World War II, 747, than any other shipyards in the United States. Liberty ships were chosen for mass production because their somewhat obsolete design was relatively simple and their triple expansion piston steam engine components were simple enough that they could be made by several companies that were not highly needed to manufacture other parts. Ship building was given a high priority for steel and other needed components as the German U-boats till 1944 sunk more ships than could be built by all the shipyards in the United States. The U.S. shipyards built about 5,926 ships in World War II plus over 100,000 more small craft made for the U.S. Army naval components.

Henry J. Kaiser's company had been building cargo ships for the U.S. Maritime Commission in the late 1930s. In 1940 orders for ships from the British government, already at war with Nazi Germany, allowed for growth. Kaiser established his first Richmond shipyard, beginning in December 1940. Eventually building three more in Richmond; each yard with four to eight slips to build ships. Kaiser-Permanente specialized in mass-producing Liberty ships fast and efficiently and that's all they built till 1944 when they switched to the much more complicated Victory ships and built some tugs and Landing Ship, Tank (LSTs) and other specialized ships in the newly built Yard #4.

- 747 EC2-S-C1 Liberty ship cargo transports were built

The following references list individual ships built:

- Kaiser Richmond No. 1 Yard; Oceans, Libertys, Victorys
- Kaiser Richmond No. 2 Yard; Liberty, Victory, Haskell-class attack transport
- Kaiser Richmond No. 3 Yard; Type C4-class ship
- Kaiser Richmond No. 4 Yard; Landing Ship, Tanks (LST)s, Tacoma-class frigate, Type C1 ship cargo, Tugs

These Liberty ships were completed in two-thirds the amount of time and at a quarter of the cost of the average of all other shipyards. The Liberty ship SS Robert E. Peary was assembled in less than five days as a part of a special competition among shipyards; but by 1944 it was only taking the astonishingly brief time of a little over two weeks to assemble a Liberty ship by standard methods. They pre-assembled major parts of the ship including the hull sections at various locations in the shipyard and then, when needed, moved them with heavy lift cranes to the shipyard launching site where they welded the pre-built sections together. After the ships were launched they were finished to their final configuration while afloat and the launch way was available to start building another ship.

In 1945, the shipyards were shut down as fast as they had started up four years earlier. Much of the shoreline previously occupied by the shipyards is now owned by Richmond, California and has been cleaned up and redeveloped under federally assisted "brownfields" programs. The 'Rosie the Riveter'/Home Front World War II National Historical Park was established on the shipyard site to commemorate and interpret the role of the home front in winning World War II.

- Richmond Shipyards Images
- Map of Kaiser-Permanente Yard #1, #2, #3 and #4
- Kaiser Shipyards

== California ports ==
California ports
City	Port name	Coordinates	Size (Note: VS=very small, S=small, M=medium, L=large, VL=very large. Nearly all ports (except oil terminals) have a small to large number of private boats used for recreation, etc.)	Main use	Ref
Antioch, California	San Joaquin Harbor	38.018446°N 121.753331°W	S	Ship Repairs	
Avalon, California	Avalon Harbor	37.91319°N 122.350316°W	S	Tourists	
Avon, California	Port of Avon	38.049088°N 122.090721°W	S	Tankers	
Benicia, California	Port of Benicia	38.045168°N 122.156296°W	M	Automobiles	
Bodega Bay, California	Porto Bodega Marina	38.334124°N 123.051295°W	VS	Tourists	
Crescent City, California	Crescent City Harbor	41.748119°N 124.184496°W	S	Fishing, Tourists	
Crockett, California	Port of Crockett	38.057705°N 122.217686°W	S	Sugar	
Dana Point, California	Dana Point Harbor	33.459963°N 117.699344°W	S	Fishing, Tourists	
El Segundo, California	El Segundo Oil Terminal	33.907109°N 118.429184°W	VS	Oil Tankers	
Eureka, California	Port of Humboldt Bay	40.738805°N 124.217134°W	M	Forest products, Logs	
Fort Bragg, California	Noyo Harbor	39.42474°N 123.800758°W	S	Fishing, Tourists	
Half Moon Bay, California	Pillar Point Harbor	37.50147°N 122.482646°W	S	Fishing, Tourists	
Long Beach, California	Port of Long Beach	33.732834°N 118.254175°W	VL	Containers, Recreational	
Los Angeles	Port of Los Angeles	33.743558°N 118.201454°W	VL	Containers, Recreational	
Martinez, California	Shell Oil Terminal Martinez	38.032476°N 122.130461°W	S	Oil Tankers, Recreation	
Monterey, California	Monterey Harbor	36.605555°N 121.892243°W	S	Fishing, Tourists	
Morro Bay, California	Morro Bay Harbor	35.370181°N 120.858021°W	S	Fishing, Tourists	
Moss Landing, California	Moss Landing	36.80243°N 121.785132°W	S	Fishing, Tourists	
Oakland, California	Port of Oakland	37.793474°N 122.299161°W	VL	Containers, Recreational	
Oceanside, California	Oceanside Harbor	33.211161°N 117.395557°W	S	Fishing, Tourists	
Pittsburg, California	Port of Pittsburg	38.035222°N 121.882496°W	S	Fishing, Tourists	
Port Hueneme, California	Port of Hueneme	34.149992°N 119.207819°W	M	Fruit Imports, Automobiles	
San Luis Obispo, California	Port San Luis Harbor	35.169371°N 120.745593°W	S	Tourists	
Redondo Beach, California	Redondo Beach Harbor	33.848142°N 118.397266°W	S	Tourists	
Redwood City, California	Port of Redwood City	37.507819°N 122.213974°W	M	Metal Scrap, Cement, Oil	
Richmond, California	Port of Richmond (California)	37.914206°N 122.364006°W	M	Liquid bulk, Automobiles	
San Diego	Port of San Diego	32.715197°N 117.223992°W	L	Cruise ships, Lumber, Auto.	
San Diego	San Diego Navy Base	32.676228°N 117.126017°W	L	Navy, USCG	
San Francisco	Port of San Francisco	37.780721°N 122.386365°W	L	Cruise ships, General Cargo	
Santa Barbara, California	Santa Barbara Harbor	34.405901°N 119.691002°W	S	Tourists, Sterns Wharf	
Santa Cruz, California	Santa Cruz Harbor	36.966532°N 122.002573°W	S	Fishing, tourists	
Stockton, California	Port of Stockton	37.952032°N 121.323395°W	M	Rice, Cement, Bulk cargo	
Two Harbors, California	Two Harbors	33.444011°N 118.496851°W	S	Resort	
West Sacramento, California	Port of West Sacramento	38.564341°N 121.549602°W	S	Rice, Bulk Cargo	

- Port of Los Angeles Long Wharf from 1894 to 1913 was a major sea port, served by rail and street cars. It was at the current site of the Will Rogers State Beach lifeguard headquarters. The wharf was the longest in the world at the time at 4,600 feet. It is a California Historical Landmark, site number 881.

== Ferry service ==
San Francisco Bay has been served by ferries of all types for over 150 years. Although the construction of the Golden Gate Bridge and the San Francisco–Oakland Bay Bridge led to the decline in the importance of most ferries, some passenger ferries are still in use today for both commuters and tourists, including Golden Gate Ferry and San Francisco Bay Ferry.

Ferry service is also available for crossing San Diego Bay from San Diego to Coronado. Passenger ferries also serve the offshore ports of Avalon and Two Harbors on Santa Catalina Island. There is no regular vehicle ferry service to Avalon, however, since the city restricts the use of cars and trucks within its borders.

== Shipwrecks ==
The Farallon Islands, the Channel Islands and the rocky mainland coast have historically provided hazardous navigational obstacles to shipping. Intermittent fogs and dangerous winds and storms often led ships to rocks, dangerous beaches and islands to be pounded by the Pacific Ocean's swell and storms. Fierce currents have always swept in and out of the entrance to the Golden Gate as the tide shifts direction. More than 140 shipwrecks have been reported in the waters of the Gulf of the Farallones National Marine Sanctuary.

One of the first recorded shipwrecks in California is that of the San Augustin, a richly laden Spanish Manila galleon, which was driven ashore in a gale in 1595 in Drake's Bay, northwest of San Francisco.

The Honda Point Disaster was the largest peacetime loss of U.S. Navy ships. On the evening of 8 September 1923, fourteen ships of Destroyer Squadron 11 were traveling at 20 knots (37 km/h) in formation while navigating by dead reckoning to find the entrance to the sometimes treacherous Santa Barbara Channel. The squadron was led by Commodore Edward H. Watson, on the flagship destroyer USS Delphy. All were Clemson-class destroyers, less than five years old. At 21:00 hours the ships turned east to course 095, supposedly heading into the entrance of Santa Barbara Channel. Seven destroyers ran aground at Honda Point, a few miles from the northern side of the Santa Barbara Channel. Two more destroyers sustained some damage. Twenty three men died.

The state keeps a Shipwrecks Database of all known California shipwrecks (1540 ea.) and their best-known latitude and longitude coordinates, ship type, owner, Captain, etc.--when known. The definition of a shipwreck included in the database is rather broad including wrecks by running aground on a shore, rocks or reefs, ship explosions, foundering (filling with water and sinking), hitting snags (sunken trees), on board fires, parted lines, etc.--essentially anything that causes damage to the ship. Many of these ships were repaired and remained in service after their accidents. These ships, their cargoes, and the mooring systems which restrained them are the physical remains of maritime.

List of notable shipwrecks

- USS Abercrombie
- USS Agerholm
- USS Anthony
- USS Anthony
- USS Archer-Fish
- USS Aspro
- USS Aspro
- USS Atlanta
- SS Avalon
- USS Barbel
- USS Benevolence
- USS Blackfin
- USS Boston
- Brother Jonathan
- USS Bunting
- USS Burrfish
- Carrier Pigeon
- Centerville Beach Cross
- USS Champlin
- USS Charles J. Kimmel
- USS Chauncey (Note: Honda Point Disaster)
- SS City of Rio de Janeiro
- USS Colahan
- SS Columbia
- USS Conyngham
- SS Cuba
- USS DeLong
- USS Delphy
- USS Deperm
- USS Devilfish
- Diosa del Mar
- SS Dominator
- USS Duncan
- SS Emidio
- SS Escambia
- USS F-1
- USS Falgout
- USS Farragut
- USS Fuller
- USS George K. MacKenzie
- USS Harveson
- USS Herreshoff No. 321
- USS Hogan
- Honda Point Disaster
- USS Hornbill
- James Rolph
- Johanna Smith
- USS John R. Craig
- King Philip shipwreck
- USS Knight
- Labouchere
- USS Lewis
- USS Magnet
- USS Marcus
- USS McCulloch
- USS Milwaukee
- SS Montebello
- USS Moray
- USS Naifeh
- USS Nicholas
- SS Northerner
- SS Ohioan
- SS Palo Alto
- USS Pensacola
- USS Radford
- USS Richard S. Bull
- USS Richey
- USS S-37
- USS S. P. Lee
- USS Sabalo
- USS Savage
- USS Sea Devil
- Sibyl Marston
- USS Skate
- USS Skipjack
- USS Sloat
- USS Somers
- SS Monte Carlo
- USS Stewart
- USS Stribling
- USS Thompson
- USS Tingey
- USS Traw
- USS Ulvert M. Moore
- USS Williams
- SS Winfield Scott
- USS Woodbury
- Wreck Alley
- USS Young
- HMCS Yukon
- Zenobia

== Lighthouses ==
California Lighthouses from Oregon to Mexico
Lighthouse	Year Built	Coord.	Ref.
St. George Reef Light	1883	41.83699°N 124.37527°W	
Battery Point Light	1856	41.74416°N 124.2031°W	
Trinidad Head Light	1871	41.05205°N 124.15147°W	
Trinidad Memorial Light	N/A	41.05834°N 124.14314°W	
Table Bluff Light	1894	40.8082°N 124.16548°W	
Humboldt Harbor Light	1856	40.7691°N 124.221°W	
Cape Mendocino Light	1868	40.02236°N 124.06946°W	
Punta Gorda Light	1912	40.24941°N 124.35021°W	
Point Cabrillo Light	1909	39.34868°N 123.82618°W	
Point Arena Light	1870	38.9546°N 123.7406°W	
Point Reyes Light	1871	37.9955°N 123.02325°W	
Farallon Island Light	1855	37.69915°N 123.00179°W	
Point Bonita Light	1855	37.8155°N 122.5297°W	
Mile Rocks Light	1906	37.79282°N 122.510375°W	
Point Diablo Light	1923	37.8201°N 122.4995°W	
Fort Point Light	1855	37.8108°N 122.47732°W	
Lime Point Light	1883	37.82545°N 122.47859°W	
Point Knox Light	1887	37.85615°N 122.44242°W	
East Brother Light	1874	37.96325°N 122.43343°W	
Alcatraz Island Light	1854	37.8262°N 122.4222°W	
Point Blunt Light	1961	37.8532°N 122.41913°W	
Yerba Buena Light	1873	37.8073°N 122.3623°W	
Relief Lightship Light	1950	37.79569°N 122.28065°W	
Oakland Harbor Light	1890	37.78132°N 122.24382°W	
Carquinez Strait Light	1873	38.06781°N 122.21372°W	
Southampton Shoal Light	1905	38.03596°N 121.49411°W	
Point Montara Light	1874	37.53652°N 122.51933°W	
Pigeon Point Light	1871	37.18171°N 122.39411°W	
Año Nuevo Light	1872	37.1084°N 122.33676°W	
Santa Cruz Light	1870	36.95146°N 122.02671°W	
Santa Cruz Breakwater Light	1964	36.96067°N 122.0022°W	
Point Pinos Lighthouse	1855	36.6334°N 121.9337°W	
Point Sur Lighthouse	1887	36.30632°N 121.90149°W	
Piedras Blancas Light	1875	35.66563°N 121.2844°W	
San Luis Obispo Light	1890	35.1604°N 120.76105°W	
Point Arguello Light	1901	34.57712°N 120.64731°W	
Point Conception Light	1856	34.44872°N 120.47072°W	
Santa Barbara Light	1856	34.39626°N 119.72291°W	
Point Hueneme Light	1874	34.1452°N 119.2100°W	
Anacapa Island Light	1930	34.0159°N 119.35946°W	
Point Vicente Light	1925	33.74193°N 118.41076°W	
Point Fermin Light	1874	33.70544°N 118.2936°W	
Long Beach Light	1949	33.72322°N 118.1868°W	
Los Angeles Harbor Light	1913	33.7086°N 118.2515°W	
Old Point Loma lighthouse	1855	32.6720°N 117.24097°W	
New Point Loma lighthouse	1891	32.66503°N 117.24266°W	

A lighthouse is a tower, building, or other type of structure designed to contain a flashing light to warn of hazards or to aid navigation primarily at night. The lights now flash on and off in a predetermined sequence to identify which light they are. Lighthouses are used as an aid to nighttime or fog-bound navigation for ship pilots and captains at sea or on inland waterways. They warn of dangerous coastlines, points of land, hazardous shoals, rocks and reefs, or mark ship channels or harbor entrances. Under clear weather a light can be seen at night about 16 miles (26 km). Now in areas of fog the lights are typically combined with a foghorn. Before foghorns were developed cannons and/or large bells (rung by clockworks) were used to warn of fog shrouded hazards. The flashing lights are usually mounted on towers or other prominent structures built on points of land, rocks or shoals near the sea. Some are built on pilings, caissons or mounted on isolated rocks. Some lighthouses are mounted on anchored Lightships when no other economical alternative exists.

In the 1850s the light was emitted from a system of oil or kerosene lamps. The light was concentrated and focused with a system of Fresnel lenses. In the 1850s the light was provided from a burning wick in a whale oil lamp. Later kerosene became available. They typically used an Argand lamp which featured a hollow wick in a glass chimney for better, brighter, combustion with a silvered parabolic reflector behind the lamp to direct and intensify the light output. All oil fired lamps used burning wicks to make the light—giving rise to one of the lighthouse keeper's nickname as "wickies" as they spent a great deal of their time trimming the wicks on their lamps in order to keep them burning brightly with minimum sooting. In the 1850s their lights were rotated using clockworks, usually powered by falling weights attached to chains. Many lighthouses had vertical shafts in them so the weights could drop the height of the tower. This provided a longer time period before the weights would have to be pulled up again by the lighthouse keepers to power the rotation mechanism. Some had to be rewound as often as every two hours.

To keep the clockworks wound, refuel the oil needed to keep the light going and keep the lighthouse equipment and windows clean and maintained the lighthouses were typically manned with a lighthouse keepers of from one to five men or women. Only a few lighthouses were located where the crews could live in comfort and/or socialize with others. Because these assignments were often in lonely fog bound locations, the crews often rotated on and off duty every few months. Families sometimes were paid to run a lighthouse.

Starting in the early 1890s the lights were provided by burning acetylene gas generated in situ from calcium carbide reacting with water. The acetylene-gas illumination system could reliably be turned on and off automatically, enabling automated unattended lighthouses to be used. Once electricity became available, often provided by one or more diesel electric generators in remote locations, the light source was gradually converted to electrical power and the clockworks were run by an electric motor.

Once widely used, the number of operational lighthouses has declined due to the expense of maintenance and their replacement by modern electronic navigational aids. Nearly all lighthouses, that are still being used, are automated to the extent possible with power often provided via solar cells and large batteries in inaccessible areas. The lighthouses are all run by the U.S. Coast Guard the successor to United States Lighthouse Service. The list of active light houses, lighted beacons, etc. that provide detailed information on aids to navigation with their locations and characteristic signals is currently maintained by the U.S. Coast Guard in its Light List issued each year. California is presently in Eleventh and Thirteenth Coast Guard district.

While the Spanish were in California their shipping was seldom more than ~2.5 ships/year, arrivals were unpredictable and communication was slow and uncertain. When nighttime signals were thought appropriate large fire might be built on the beach. Essentially there was no nighttime navigation—it was too hazardous. During nighttime ships kept well off shore till daylight or anchored. Things only improved slightly when Mexico controlled California as the shipping increased to about 25 ships/year.

When the California Gold Rush started and the number of ships per year jumped to over 700 ships per year and lighthouse technology had advanced far enough, mainly through the introduction of the Fresnel lens and Argand lamps, lighthouses started to become much more useful and feasible. Several bad shipwrecks showed that there were many hazards to navigation that needed to be marked at night or in fog. Since from 1790 till well after 1850 the U.S. Federal Government was over 85% financed by import tariffs (also called customs duties or ad valorem taxes) on imported foreign goods of about 25% there was already a steady flow of money collected from California shipping going to Washington. Since all tariffs were paid by foreign goods shipped into the United States since 1790 by the Revenue Marine (predecessor of the U.S. Coast Guard) closely monitored ship traffic. Tariffs collected by the Collector of Customs who was charged with inspecting each ship that came into port and collecting the appropriate tariff tax. The first Collector of Customs in California was Edward H. Harrison appointed by General Kearny in 1848. To get some of this revenue flowing back to California, California congressmen started petitioning for lighthouses and Congress soon agreed. By 1850 the East Coast already had a fairly extensive array of light houses so the same technology, developed over decades of use, was transferred to the West Coast of the United States.

The firm of Francis A. Gibbons and Francis Kelly was awarded the contract to build California's first seven lighthouses in 1853. The lighthouse on Alcatraz Island was the first and was in operation in the San Francisco Bay by 1855—completion was delayed because of the shortage of Fresnel lenses. More than 45 lighthouses were eventually built along the California coast.

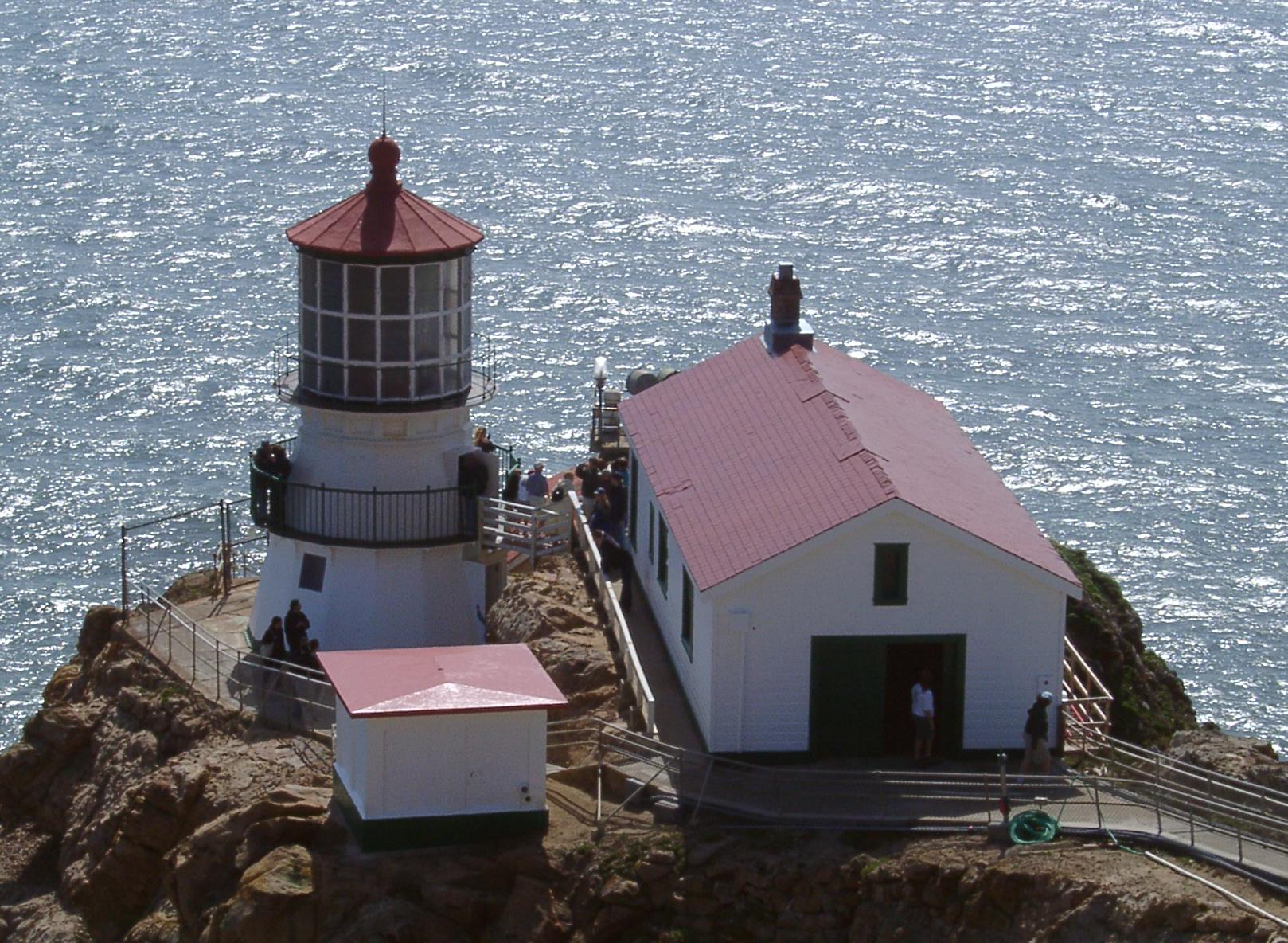
Point Reyes Lighthouse

Despite the efforts of the men and women who were stationed at the Point Reyes lighthouse, ships continued to wreck on the nearby coast. The Life-Saving Service opened the first of two Life Saving Stations built at Point Reyes in 1889. The second station, at Drakes Beach, closed in 1968. The workers stationed there attempted the rescue of victims of storms and shipwrecks. The incredible danger of their job and the dedication they have to their jobs can be sensed in the U.S. Coast Guard's unofficial motto,

"You have to go out, but you don't have to come back in."

== See also ==
- History of California
- History of California before 1900
- History of the United States Merchant Marine
- Humboldt Bay
- San Francisco Maritime National Historical Park
- Spanish expeditions to the Pacific Northwest
- West Coast lumber trade
- California during World War II

== Notes ==
The California U.S. Census of 1850 showed 92,597 residents. To this should be added residents from San Francisco, (the largest city in the state then) Santa Clara, and Contra Costa counties whose censuses were burned up or lost and not included in the totals. San Francisco's 1850 U.S. census was lost in one of their periodic fires that swept the city six times in their first few years

Newspaper accounts in 1850 (Alta Californian) gives the population of San Francisco city/county at 21,000; The special California state Census of 1852 finds 6,158 residents of Santa Clara county, 2,786 residents of Contra Costa County and 36,134 in the fast-growing San Francisco city/county. The "corrected" California U.S. 1850 Census is over 120,000. The 1850 U.S. Census shows 7,765 Hispanic residents that were born in California. See: U.S. Seventh Census 1850: California which includes the special 1852 California state census.
