= New York helicopter crash =

New York helicopter crash may refer to:

- 2009 Hudson River mid-air collision, between a tour helicopter and a small private airplane, crashing between Hoboken and Manhattan
- 2018 New York City helicopter crash, sightseeing helicopter crashed into the East River, near Roosevelt Island
- 2025 Hudson River helicopter crash, in-flight breakup of sightseeing helicopter between Newport and Manhattan
