= 2009 California mid-air collision =

US Coast Guard aircraft Marine Corps helicopter collision

Coordinates: 32.961°N 118.092°W

Accident
- Date: October 29, 2009
- Summary: Mid-air collision
- Site: The Pacific Ocean, 24 kilometres (15 mi) east of San Clemente Island, California
- Total fatalities: 9
- Total survivors: 0

First aircraft
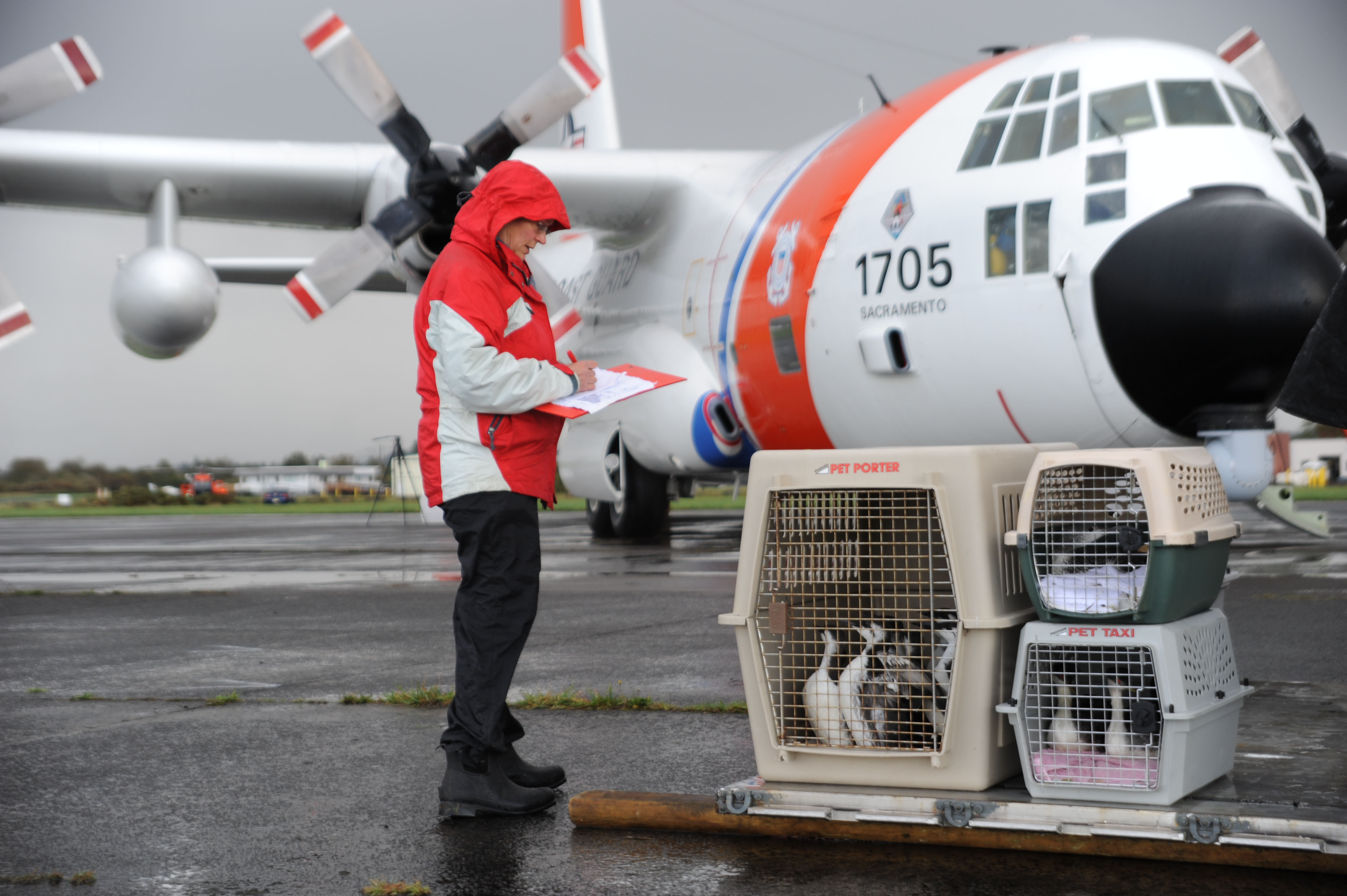
- 1705, the C-130 Hercules involved during a mission
- Type: Lockheed HC-130H Hercules
- Name: 1705
- Operator: United States Coast Guard
- Registration: 1705
- Flight origin: McClellan Airfield
- Destination: McClellan Airfield
- Occupants: 7
- Crew: 7
- Fatalities: 7
- Survivors: 0

Second aircraft
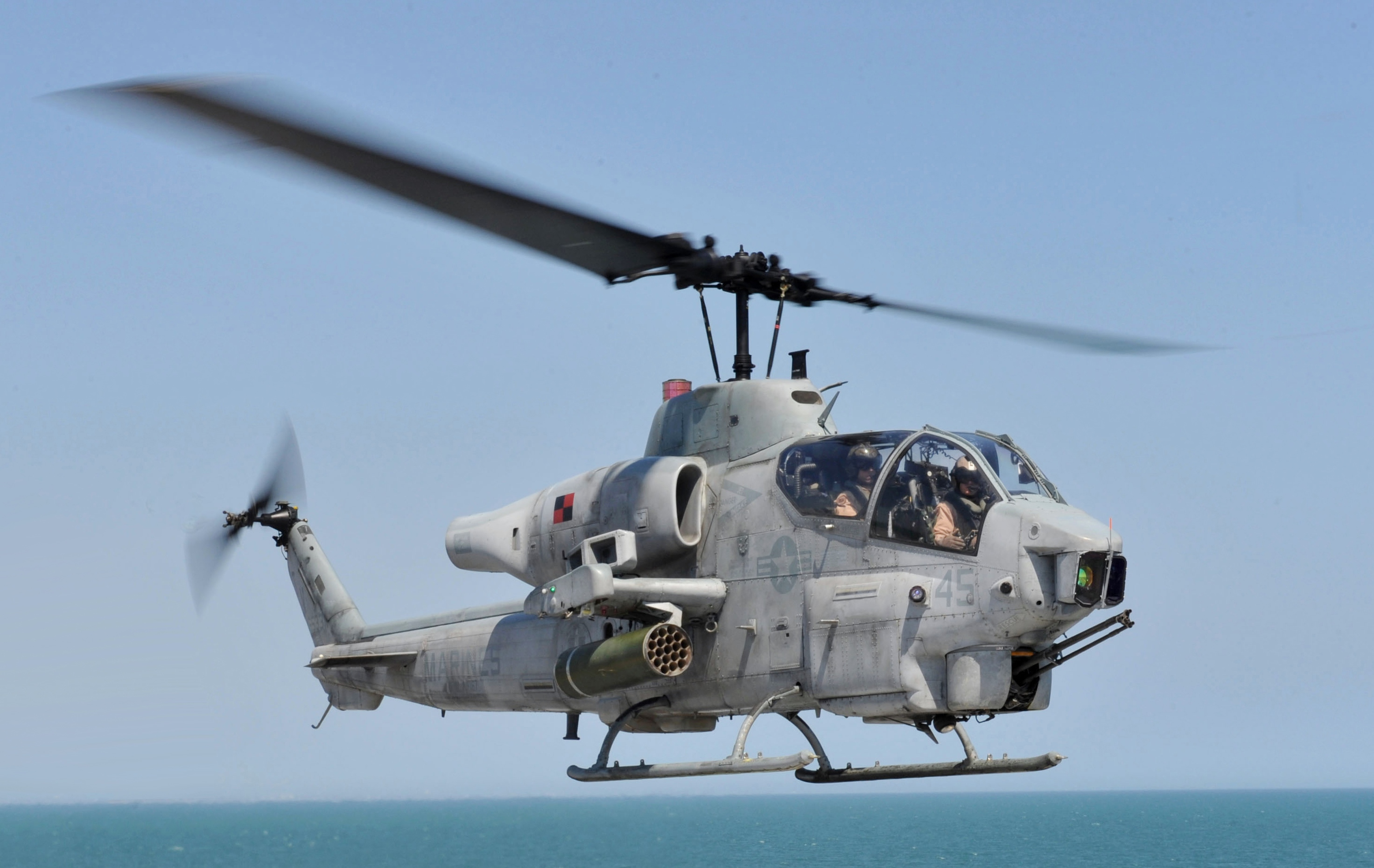
- An AH-1W SuperCobra of the U.S. Marine Corps
- Type: Bell AH-1W Super Cobra
- Operator: United States Marine Corps
- Occupants: 2
- Crew: 2
- Fatalities: 2
- Survivors: 0

The 2009 California mid-air collision occurred at sea, west of San Diego, on 29 October. It involved a Lockheed HC-130H Hercules of the United States Coast Guard and a Bell AH-1 SuperCobra of the U.S. Marine Corps. There were no survivors among the nine crewmates aboard either aircraft.

== Accident ==
At 19:10 local time on 29 October 2009 (02:10 on 30 October UTC), a Lockheed HC-130H Hercules aircraft of the United States Coast Guard and a Bell AH-1W Super Cobra helicopter of the United States Marine Corps collided in mid-air. The location of the accident was 24 kilometres (15 mi) east off San Clemente Island, California. The Hercules was carrying a crew of seven and the Cobra a crew of two people; there were no survivors. Eyewitnesses reported seeing a fireball in the sky. Debris from the collision was reported at the scene. The Hercules was on a Search and Rescue mission to search for an overdue john boat while the Super Cobra was on a training flight. Two Sikorsky CH-53E helicopters along with USCGC Edisto, USCGC Petrel and USCGC Blackfin were sent to search the area. USCGC Blacktip, USCGC George Cobb and USCGC Jarvis later joined the search.

The search for survivors was cancelled on 1 November 2009 after searching 644 square miles (486 sq nmi; 1,670 km^{2}) of ocean, including approximately 50 miles (80 km) of floating debris. The effort was converted to a recovery operation. All nine individuals in the accident, including seven aboard the Coast Guard plane and two aboard the Marine helicopter were presumed dead.

=== Crew Members ===
The Coast Guard plane included Lt. Cmdr. Che Barnes of Capay, CA, and his co-pilot, Lt. Adam Bryant of Crewe, VA. The other crew members were Chief Petty Officer John Seidman of Carmichael, CA, a flight engineer; Petty Officer Second Class Carl P. Grigonis of Mayfield Heights, OH, a navigator; Petty Officer Second Class Monica L. Beacham of Decaturville, TN, a radio operator; Petty Officer Second Class Jason S. Moletzsky of Norristown, PA; and Petty Officer Third Class Danny R. Kreder II, of Elm Mott, TX.

The crew members aboard the Marine helicopter were Maj. Samuel Leigh of Belgrade, ME, and First Lt. Thomas Claiborne of Douglas, CO.

== Aircraft ==
=== HC-130 Hercules ===
The HC-130H Hercules involved was serial number 1705. The aircraft was c/n 382-4993 and it had formerly served with the United States Air Force as 83–0007. It was based at the Coast Guard Air Station in Sacramento, California. It had been in service previously at Air Station Barber's Point, Hawaii.

=== AH-1W Super Cobra ===
The Super Cobra was operated by Marine Aircraft Group 39, based at Camp Pendleton. Personnel aboard the aircraft belonged to Marine Aircraft Group 39 and the 3rd Marine Aircraft Wing, based at Miramar.

== Investigation ==
A joint investigation by the United States Coast Guard and the U.S. Marine Corps was opened into the accident, headed by Rear Admiral Korn. The investigation concluded in mid-2010 and each agency released its own report of findings. Both agencies found that there was no single cause for the accident, and there was no misconduct on the part of any aircrew involved. However, both identified serious failings on the part of the U.S. Navy air traffic control center that had responsibility for the airspace within which the collision occurred.

== See also ==
- 2009 Hudson River mid-air collision
