= Santa Barbara Harbor =

Small-craft harbor in Santa Barbara, California

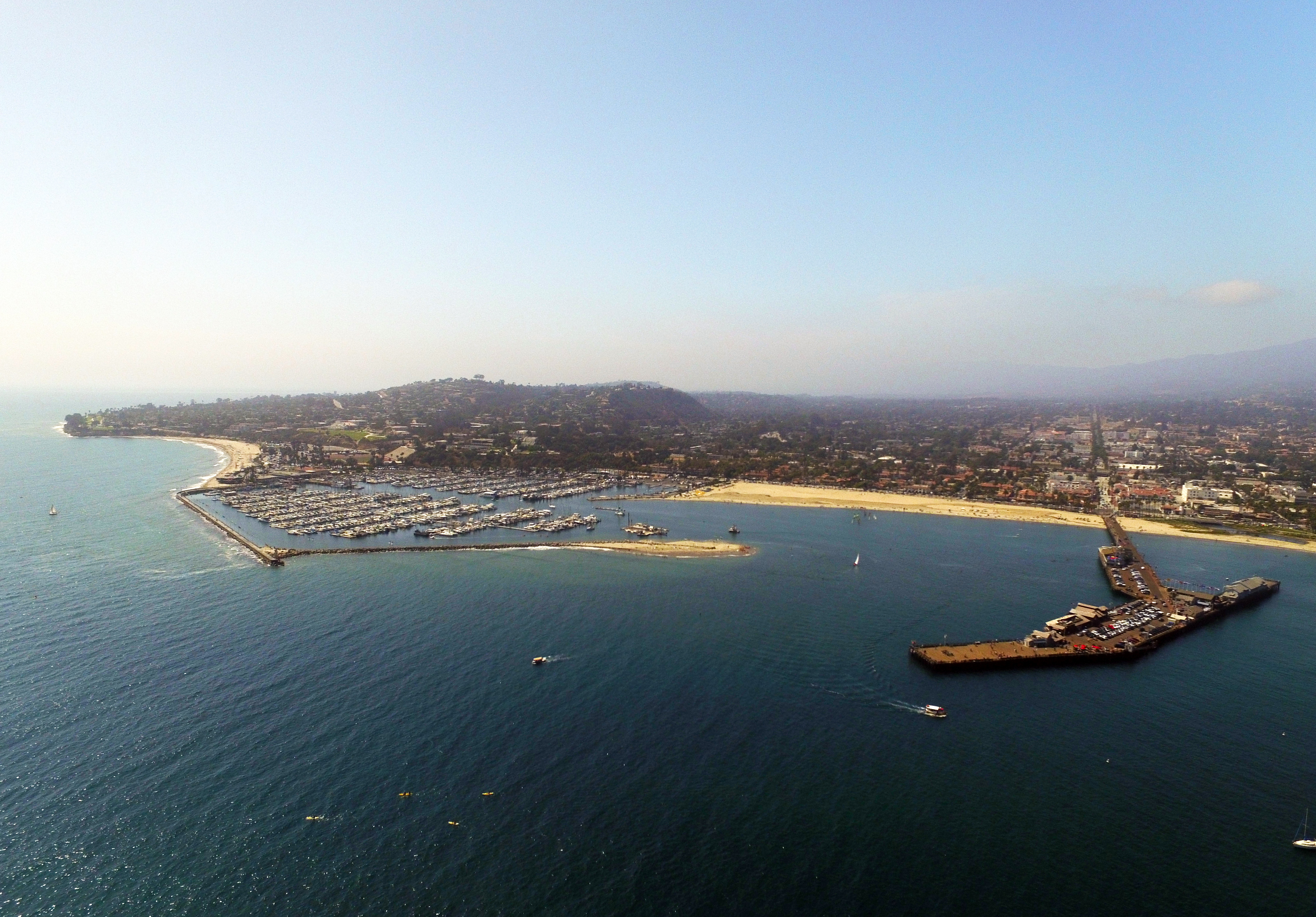
- The harbor with Stearns Wharf visible to the right and Leadbetter Beach on the left.
- Interactive map of Santa Barbara Harbor

Location
- Location: Santa Barbara, California
- Coordinates: 34.404°N 119.694°W

Details
- Opened: 1928–1930 (breakwater)
- Operated by: City of Santa Barbara Waterfront Department
- Owned by: City of Santa Barbara
- Type of Harbor: Small-craft harbor and marina
- No. of berths: About 1,140 slips

Statistics
- Website santabarbaraca.gov/node/2923

Santa Barbara Harbor is a small-craft harbor on the Santa Barbara Channel in Santa Barbara, California. It is sheltered by a breakwater built between 1927 and 1930, largely with money from the philanthropist Max Fleischmann. The harbor holds more than 1,100 boat slips, a commercial fishing fleet, the United States Coast Guard cutter Blackfin and is home to the Santa Barbara Maritime Museum. It is run by the city's Waterfront Department, which also manages Stearns Wharf and about 252 acres (102 ha) of tidelands. When created, the breakwater interrupted the natural flow of sand along the coast resulting in sand piling up west of it to form Leadbetter Beach. Over th years it kept filling the harbor entrance, so the United States Army Corps of Engineers dredges the channel twice a year.

== History ==
=== Before the harbor ===
Santa Barbara has no natural harbor. Ships visiting in the Mexican era anchored in the open roadstead off the beach and goods and passengers were carried through the surf in small boats. Richard Henry Dana Jr. described the anchorage during his visit in the 1830s in Two Years Before the Mast (1840). A short wharf was built at the foot of Chapala Street in 1868, but it could not reach deep water. Large ships still anchored half a mile or more offshore and paid to have cargo carried in by smaller craft. On September 16, 1872, the first ship docked at Stearns Wharf, built by lumberman John Peck Stearns at the foot of State Street. For decades it was the city's main landing for ships.

=== Breakwater (1927–1930) ===
In 1926 Max Fleischmann, heir to the Fleischmann's Yeast fortune, offered the city $200,000 ($3.6 million in 2025) toward a breakwater if the city matched it. He wanted a sheltered mooring for his yacht, the Haida. Construction began in 1927 on a detached breakwater of about 1,800 feet (550 m), set offshore with a gap between it and the beach. Soon after the completion, sand began to collect in the gap and in 1930 the breakwater was joined to the shore by an extension of about 600 feet (180 m). Fleischmann paid for the extension, and by one account his gifts to the project totaled $630,000 ($11.5 million in 2025). The completed breakwater is approximately 2,400 feet (730 m) long.

=== Sand and dredging ===
Sand on the Santa Barbara coast drifts from west to east. The breakwater trapped it and by 1931 sand was moving along the breakwater and into the navigation channel, threatening to close the harbor. Beaches east of the harbor lost their supply of sand and eroded leading to lawsuits against the city. West of the breakwater the trapped sand built up a wide new beach that became Leadbetter Beach. Coastal engineering texts use the harbor as an example of how a breakwater can block longshore drift.

The harbor is a federal navigation project. Congress authorized it in the Rivers and Harbors Act of 1935. The Army Corps of Engineers' Los Angeles District dredges the federal entrance channel, navigation channels and a sand trap twice a year, in spring and fall. A six-year program assessed in 2016 allowed for removing up to 600,000 cubic yards (460,000 m^{3}) a year. The dredged sand is pumped east to East Beach to replace the sand the harbor blocks.

Large swells can still close the entrance. On January 9, 2023, unusually high surf of 12 to 14 feet deposited about two years' worth of sand in the channel within 24 to 48 hours, effectively closing the harbor. The Corps' contractor began emergency dredging on January 25, and the dredge Sandpiper removed more than 30,000 cubic yards (23,000 m^{3}) of sand before the harbor reopened nearly three weeks later.

=== Navy era ===
In 1939 a Naval Reserve armory was built for the United States Navy at the harbor. During World War II the building became a Small Craft Training Center, where crews trained in minesweeping. In 1994, the Navy sold the Naval Reserve Center to the city for $2.4 million ($5.2 million in 2025). The building, now called the Waterfront Center, reopened on July 29, 2000, as the home of the Santa Barbara Maritime Museum. It also houses offices of the National Oceanic and Atmospheric Administration, a visitor center and multiple restaurants.

=== Later development ===
In 1998 the California Coastal Commission reviewed a city project to expand the marinas, including 67 to 69 new slips in Marina One. In 2026 the city began studying long-term responses to sea level rise on its waterfront. Options presented to the City Council on in March 2026, included raising or modifying the harbor breakwater and adding flood protection for the harbor's commercial area. Staff noted that the local sea level had risen 3 to 4 inches since 2000.

== Operations ==
The harbor is owned by the city and run by the Waterfront Department. A city Harbor Commission advises the City Council on harbor matters. The Santa Barbara Municipal Code sets the rules for slip permits, including slips the Waterfront Director reserves for qualified commercial fishermen. Approximately 1,140 slipts are available. Visiting boats that cannot get a slip may use an open anchorage east of Stearns Wharf and a water taxi runs between the harbor and the wharf.

The Waterfront Department's Harbor Patrol is the main emergency response agency for the harbor, marinas, city beaches and Stearns Wharf. Its primary duty is enforcing laws on land and water in the waterfront area. It also provides emergency medical care, ocean rescue, boating education and emergency fire response in partnership with the Santa Barbara City Fire Department. Its regular patrol area runs from Santa Barbara Point to Loon Point and up to 3 miles (4.8 km) offshore. Rescue and mutual aid calls take it as far as Coal Oil Point, Rincon Island and 12 miles (19 km) out into the Santa Barbara Channel. Harbor Patrol officers stopped carrying firearms in October 2024 after a change in state rules on weapons certification for law enforcement. Crimes that call for a penal code response are handled by the Santa Barbara Police Department.

The Harbor Patrol works closely with the Santa Barbara City Fire department on fires and rescues on the water. It coordinates with City Fire and Santa Barbara County Fire as well as the Coast Guard and other agencies. In September 2019, Harbor Patrol and City Fire personnel were among the first one scene of the MV Conception fire that killed 34 people in Platts Harbor on Santa Cruz Island.

In March 2025, the Harbor Patrol christened a new patrol, fire and rescue boat, an M2 catamaran built by Moose Boats of Vallejo, California. It is equipped for marine firefighting, law enforcement, emergency medical response, search and rescue and emergency towing and can be sent to mutual aid calls from partner agencies. It replaced Patrol Boat No. 3, which had served since 1999. The city paid for it from a vessel replacement fund the Waterfront Department had set up years earlier.

In addition to Harbo Patrol, the Coast Guard cutter Blackfin, a Marine Protector-class patrol boat, is based at the harbor and patrols the Southern California coast.

== Commercial fishing ==
The harbor is home to one of California's most valuable small fishing fleets. In 2020 its landings ranked first in the state by value, at $11.4 million. California spiny lobster is its most valuable catch. City figures for 2020 list 262,634 pounds of spiny lobster worth $4,909,680. Other local catches include crab, sea urchin and prawns.

Fishermen sell their catch directly to the public at the Saturday Fishermen's Market on the harbor's City Pier. Gordon Cota and Ricky Gutierrez started the market in the early 1980s after seeing a similar operation in the Pacific Northwest. Each October the Santa Barbara Harbor & Seafood Festival marks the opening of the commercial lobster season with fresh seafood and harbor activities.

== See also ==
- Stearns Wharf
- Leadbetter Beach
- West Beach
- Naval Reserve Center Santa Barbara
- Santa Barbara Channel
- Santa Barbara Light
