= Hudson River crash =

Hudson River crash could refer to:

- US Airways Flight 1549 - ditching of a flock-stroken Airbus in the river in 2009
- 2009 Hudson River mid-air collision of a small plane with a helicopter
- 2025 Hudson River helicopter crash - Bell 206 sightseeing helicopter lost control and hit the river
