= Julie Williams =

Julie Williams may refer to:

- Julie Williams (scientist) (born 1957), Welsh scientist and professor
- Julie Olson Williams, fictional character on the American television series Days of Our Lives
- Julie Yip-Williams (1976–2018), American lawyer and writer

== See also ==
- Julia Williams (disambiguation)
