= 2018 New York City helicopter crash =

Helicopter crash in New York

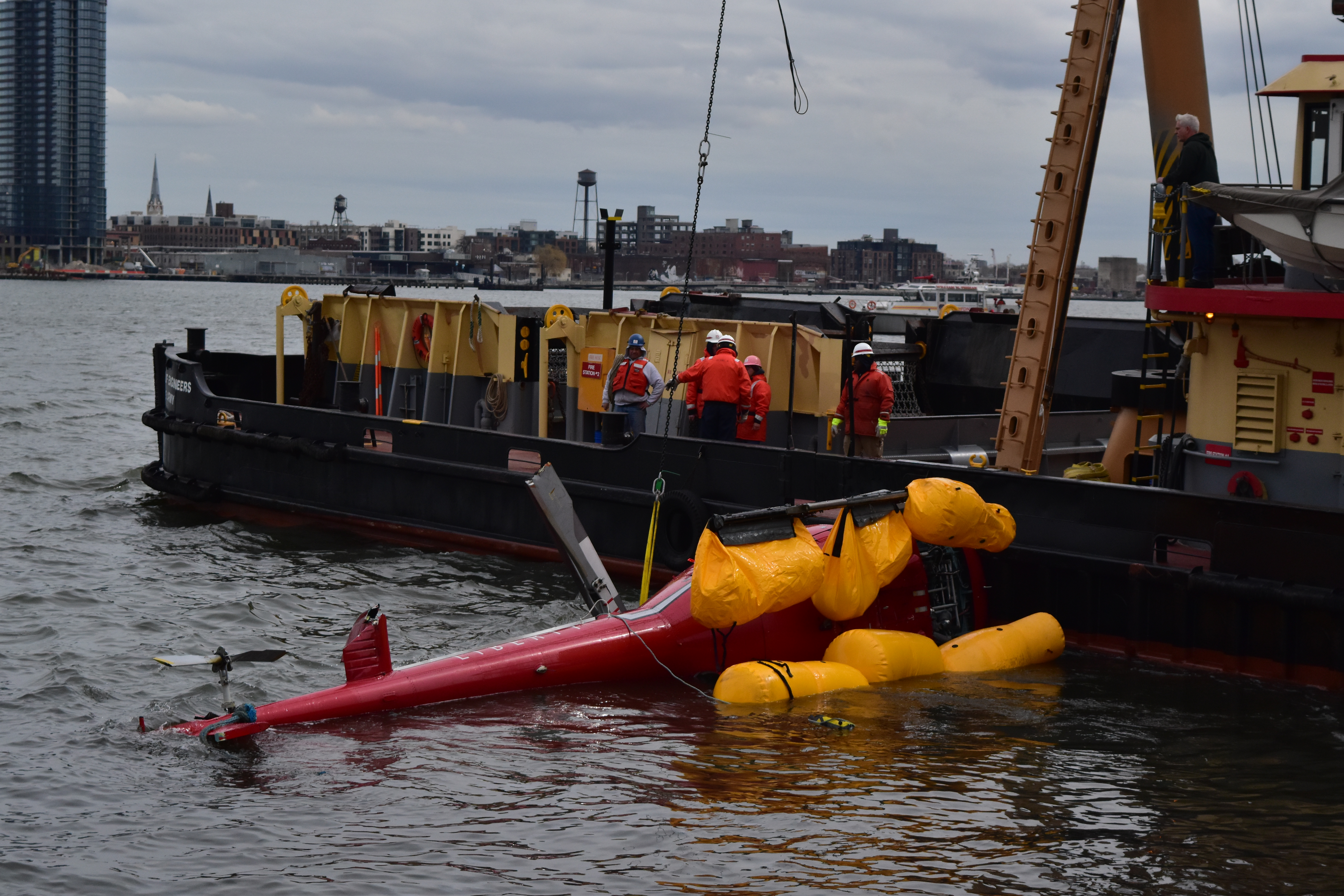
- N350LH being recovered from the East River on March 12, 2018

Accident
- Date: March 11, 2018
- Summary: Crashed into river following loss of engine power
- Site: East River, New York City, United States; 40.773611°N 73.939444°W

Aircraft
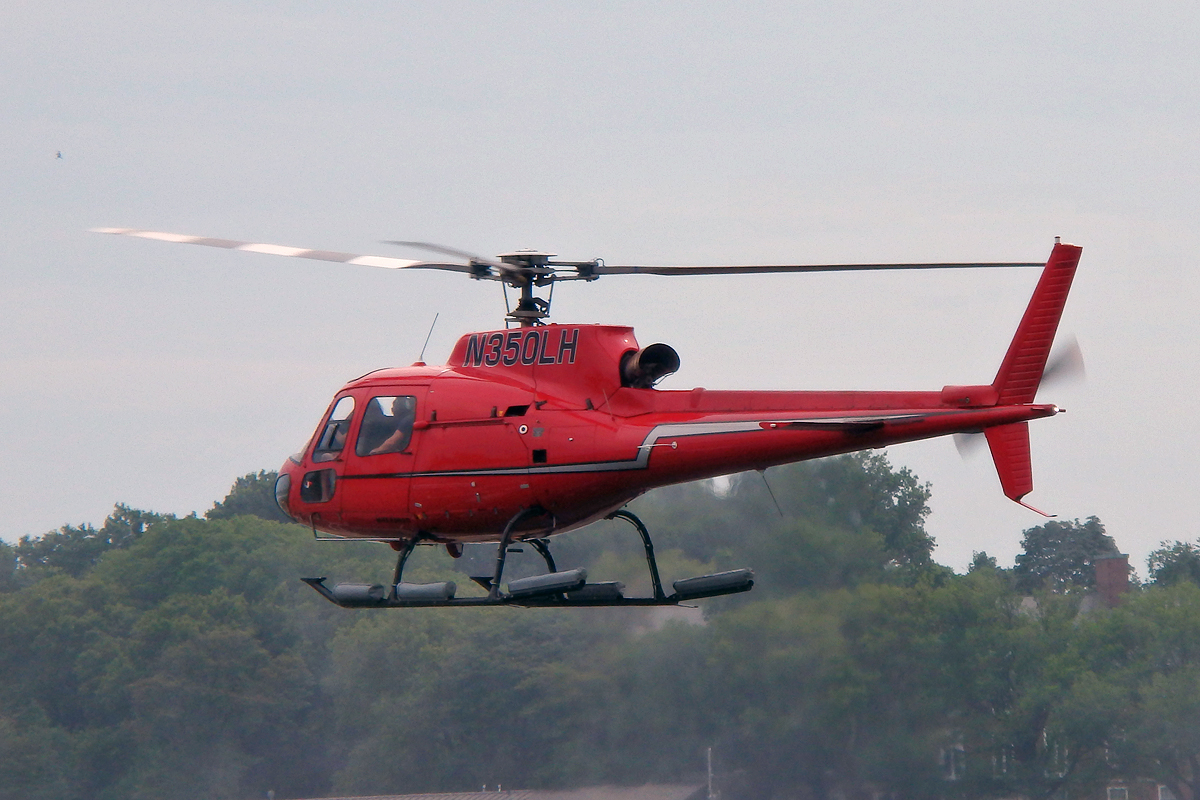
- N350LH, the helicopter involved, photographed in July 2014
- Aircraft type: Eurocopter AS350B2 Écureuil
- Operator: Liberty Helicopters
- Registration: N350LH
- Flight origin: Helo Kearny Heliport, New Jersey, United States
- Destination: Helo Kearny Heliport, New Jersey, United States
- Occupants: 6
- Passengers: 5
- Crew: 1
- Fatalities: 5
- Injuries: 1
- Survivors: 1

On March 11, 2018, a sightseeing Eurocopter AS350 Écureuil helicopter crashed into the East River off the Upper East Side of Manhattan, New York City, killing five people. Two passengers died at the scene, and three others were pronounced dead at the hospital. The pilot escaped the helicopter following the crash. The aircraft was operated by Liberty Helicopters for FlyNyon.

== Aircraft ==
The aircraft involved in the incident was a Eurocopter AS350B2 Écureuil, that had not been involved in any prior accidents. The tour company had two other crashes in the preceding 11 years. The helicopter flew with open doors, and passengers were required to wear both the helicopter's primary restraints (seatbelts) along with a supplemental harness (provided by NYONair), designed to keep them inside the helicopter; the supplemental harnesses underwent scrutiny as a potential cause of fatality due to the difficulty of releasing the harness.

The helicopter was equipped with primary restraints for the pilot and each passenger provided by the manufacturer compliant with 14 CFR 27.785. Each passenger was also equipped with a supplemental harness system which allowed them to move within the cabin and sit in the door sill while airborne. The center passengers in the four-abreast rear bench seat were allowed to remove their primary restraints, leave their seat, and sit on the sills; they were prevented from falling out of the helicopter by the supplemental harnesses. The passengers on the outboard ends of the rear seat and front passenger seat were allowed to rotate outboard, but their primary restraints were not intended to be released. The supplemental harness was an off-the-shelf nylon fall arrest device which anchored each passenger to the helicopter; ground crew were responsible for attaching and detaching a locking carabiner to the back of each passenger's supplemental harness at the start and end of each flight. Each carabiner was at the end of a tether attached in the helicopter's cabin. The supplemental harnesses were provided by FlyNYON, the vendor which had sold the passenger tickets.

The flight was being conducted by the operator Liberty Helicopters under 14 CFR 91 rules as an air tour for aerial photography for FlyNYON under 14 CFR 136 rules. According to a 2014 study, the crash rate of Part 91 air tours is 3.5 per 100,000 hours flown, "similar to the reported crash rates in categories considered to be 'high hazard' commercial aviation" such as medevac and off-shore drilling transport. Liberty Helicopters spent $120,000 lobbying the mayor's office and the Economic Development Corporation in 2015, according to an article about the curtailment of tourist flights from the Downtown Manhattan Heliport in 2016. Liberty and FlyNYON stated the flights met exemption criteria under 14 CFR 119.1(e)(4)(iii) for aerial photography.

== Accident ==
The flight originated from Helo Kearny Heliport (FAA LID: 65NJ) at approximately 1900 EDT on March 11, 2018. The pilot had been flying passengers for FlyNYON on flights lasting 15 to 30 minutes since 11:00 that day, although he could not recall how many flights he had completed. When the van carrying the passengers arrived, the pilot checked each passenger's harness and put their life vests on. After seating the passengers in the helicopter, he locked their harness tethers to the helicopter and provided safety instructions, including where the cutting tool was on their harness and how to use it.

The pilot, following the passengers' requests for sights, flew toward the Statue of Liberty at an altitude ranging from 300–500 ft (91–152 m) above ground level (agl), then proceeded to the Brooklyn Bridge and Central Park. After contacting the tower at LaGuardia Airport to request entry into its controlled airspace, the pilot started to climb to approximately 2,000 ft (610 m) agl. During the climb, he noticed the front passenger had removed his primary restraint, and reminded the passenger to keep the restraint fastened, as the passengers in the left front, left rear, and right rear seats were supposed to stay restrained while the inboard passengers in the center rear seats were allowed to unclip their primary restraints and sit on the floor with their feet on the skids.

Onboard video reviewed after the crash showed the front passenger turned in his seat so he was facing outboard with his legs outside the helicopter. While taking several photographs between 19:00 and 19:05, he leaned backward and his supplemental harness tether hung down loosely near the helicopter's floor-mounted controls. At 19:05:51, when he sat up again, video showed the tail of the tether became taut, then suddenly released; this was followed two seconds later by decreased engine noises. Radar showed the helicopter began to descend at 19:06:11.

According to several witnesses, the helicopter suddenly descended near the northern end of Roosevelt Island and then plummeted into the river. The helicopter was described to be autorotating at low altitudes immediately prior to its crash. The pilot stated, in a post-crash interview with the National Transportation Safety Board (NTSB), that a low rotor rpm alarm began to sound and warning lights came on, indicating low engine and fuel pressure. At that point, he believed the engine had failed and considered landing at Central Park, but thought there were too many people present to attempt a landing, and directed the helicopter towards the East River instead, starting the turn at 19:06:30. The pilot radioed a mayday call to LaGuardia at 19:06:58.

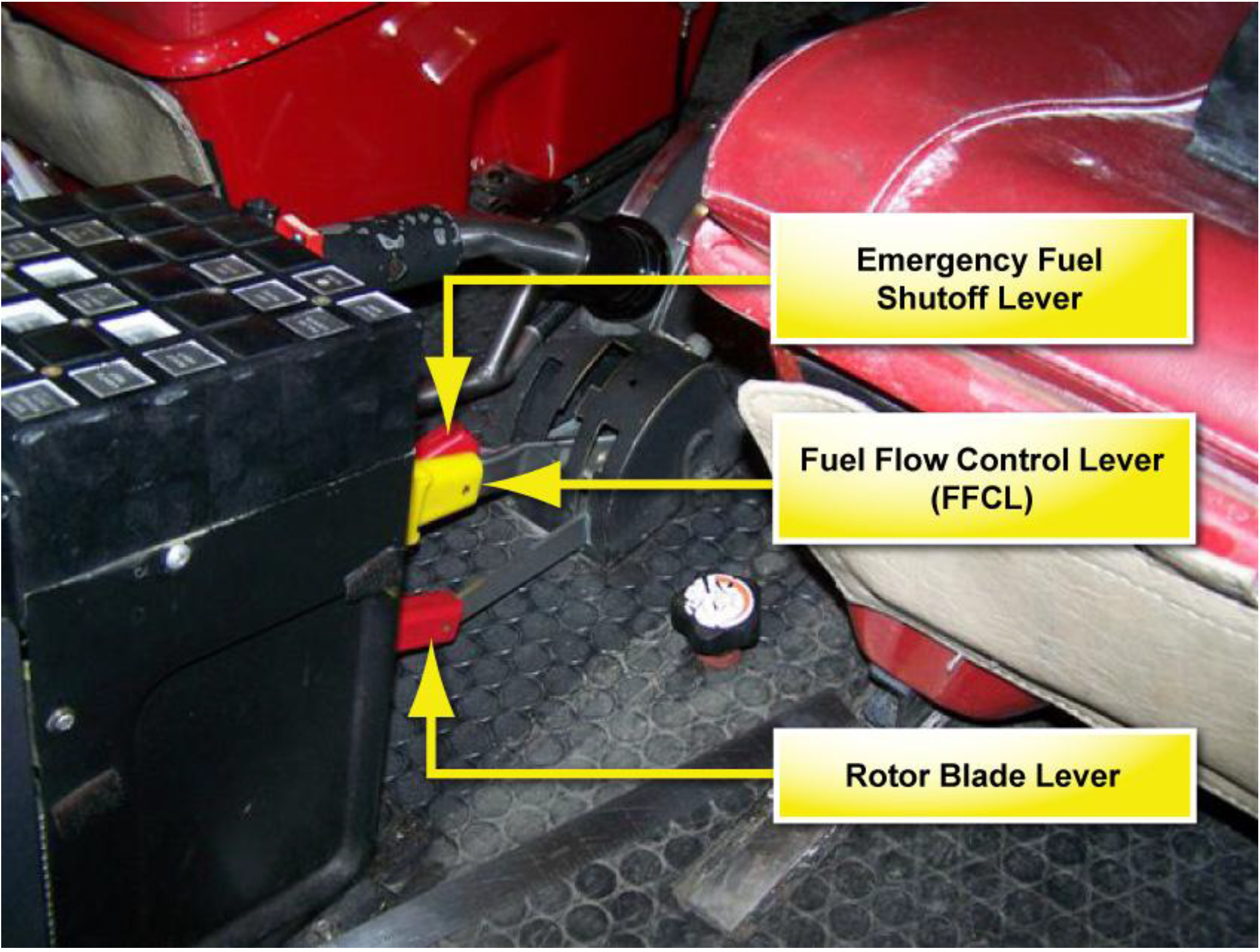
Diagram showing the positions of fuel flow control lever and emergency fuel shutoff lever on the console of a Eurocopter AS350 B2

During the descent, the pilot attempted to restart the engine at least twice, and then he confirmed the fuel flow control lever was still positioned for normal operation. After he was sure the helicopter could reach the river, the pilot activated the skid-mounted floats at 19:07:02, 800 ft (240 m) agl. When he reached to engage the emergency fuel shutoff lever in preparation for a hard landing, he realized it had already been activated, and that part of a passenger's fall protection tether was underneath the fuel shutoff lever. When he disengaged the fuel shutoff lever, he was able to restart the engine, but at that point, the helicopter had already descended past 300 ft (91 m) agl and the engine "wasn't spooling up fast enough" to avoid a crash landing. He put the helicopter in a nose-up flare before it hit the water.

With the doors off, the cabin began to fill with water, first on the pilot's side (right side) of the cabin. The pilot stated he started to unlock the carabiner securing the front passenger's tether to the helicopter, but had gotten no more than two or three rotations before the helicopter began to sink, rolling past a 45° list. Subsequent review of a video showing the descent (recorded by a witness using a cellphone) led aviation experts to believe the passengers would have survived had the helicopter not turned over and sunk. The aircraft sank 11 seconds after touching down on the water, at approximately 19:07:26, when the onboard video camera's lens became submerged.

The pilot, who was not attached to the aircraft by a supplemental harness, unbuckled his manufacturer-provided primary restraint after the helicopter was submerged and escaped. All five passengers drowned after the helicopter rolled over into the water as they were trapped by their supplemental harnesses. To leave the aircraft, a passenger would have had to either reach behind them and unscrew the locking carabiner (or assist another passenger with their carabiner), or use a cutting tool (provided by FlyNYON and attached to each harness) to sever the tether. A passing tugboat heard the mayday call from the pilot and tied up to the helicopter to keep it from sinking further. Rescue divers responded seven minutes after the first 911 call. The passengers were cut out of the wreck by emergency responders, some after having been dragged for 50 blocks south in the upside-down helicopter: a 3-knot (5.6 km/h; 3.5 mph) current pulled the helicopter from 86th to 34th during the rescue. The pilot was taken to the hospital for observation.

== Investigation ==
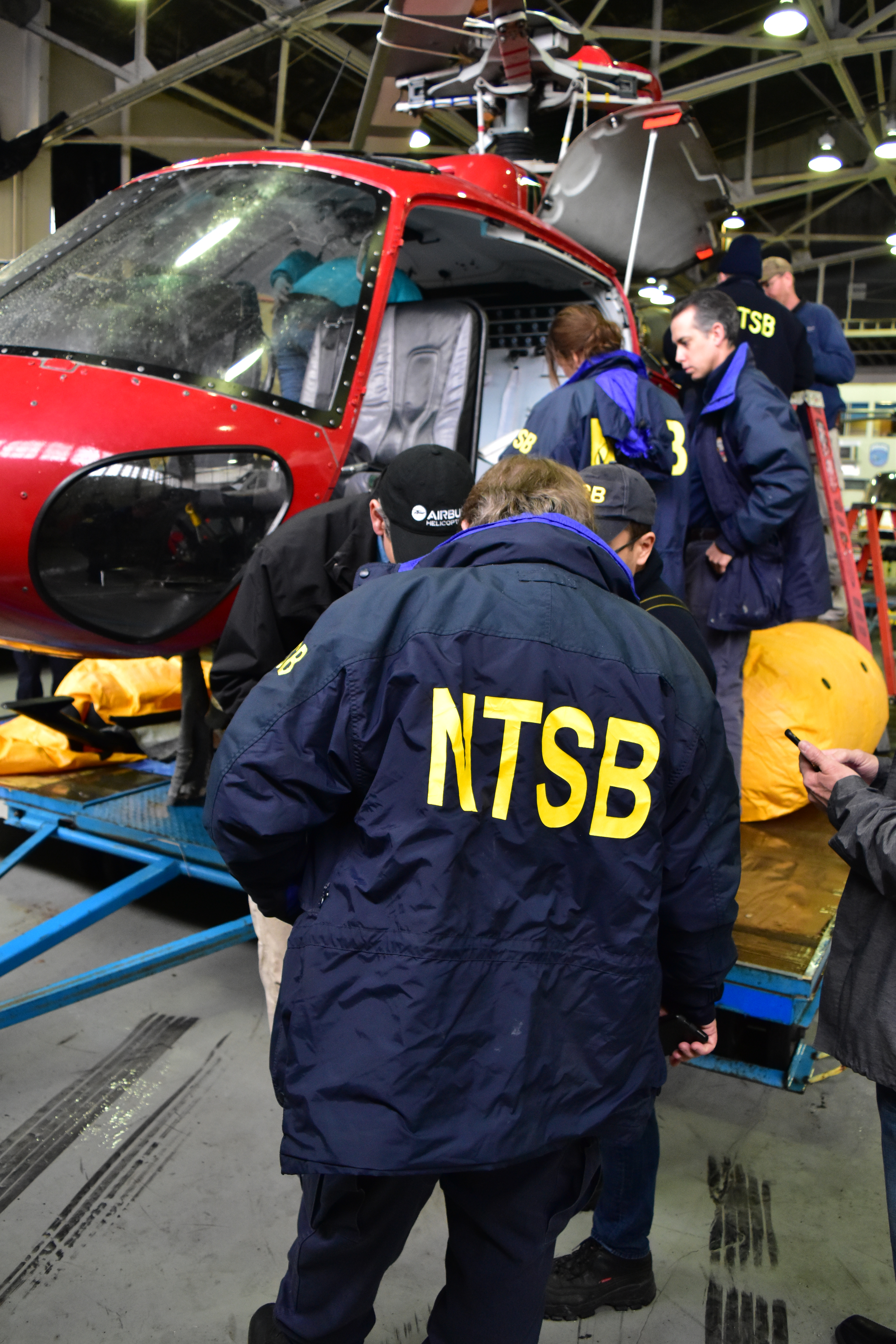
NTSB investigators examine the recovered wreckage of N350LH on March 13, 2018

The NTSB opened an investigation immediately following the incident.

=== Supplemental harness ===
Almost immediately, passengers on previous flights pointed out the "complicated system of straps, carabiners and an emergency blade for cutting [the proprietary eight-point Safety Harness System] off in case of trouble" and inadequate training as probable causes for the passengers' deaths in a March 12 New York Times article about the crash. Several internal documents showed that pilots for Liberty and FlyNYON had requested better-fitting supplemental passenger harnesses as well as better tools that would make it easier for passengers to free themselves for up to two months preceding the fatal flight. The supplemental harnesses used in most flights were yellow nylon harnesses designed as fall protection for construction workers, and the pilots stated they preferred a more expensive blue harness which was more adjustable, had been certified by the FAA for helicopter operations (under technical standard order C167), and had more attachment points, some of which were more accessible to passengers. Patrick Day, CEO of FlyNYON, stated to the New York Times that on October 31, 2017, "inspectors observed the harness and tethering process [at FlyNYON's facility] and continued to permit their use on Liberty and FlyNYON operated flights without issue". A spokesman for the FAA stated that supplemental harnesses are not subject to inspection. FlyNYON staff were instructed to use zip ties to modify the harnesses to fit smaller passengers, and applied masking tape, which FlyNYON called "NYON blue safety tape", to prevent inadvertent release of harnesses and restraints.

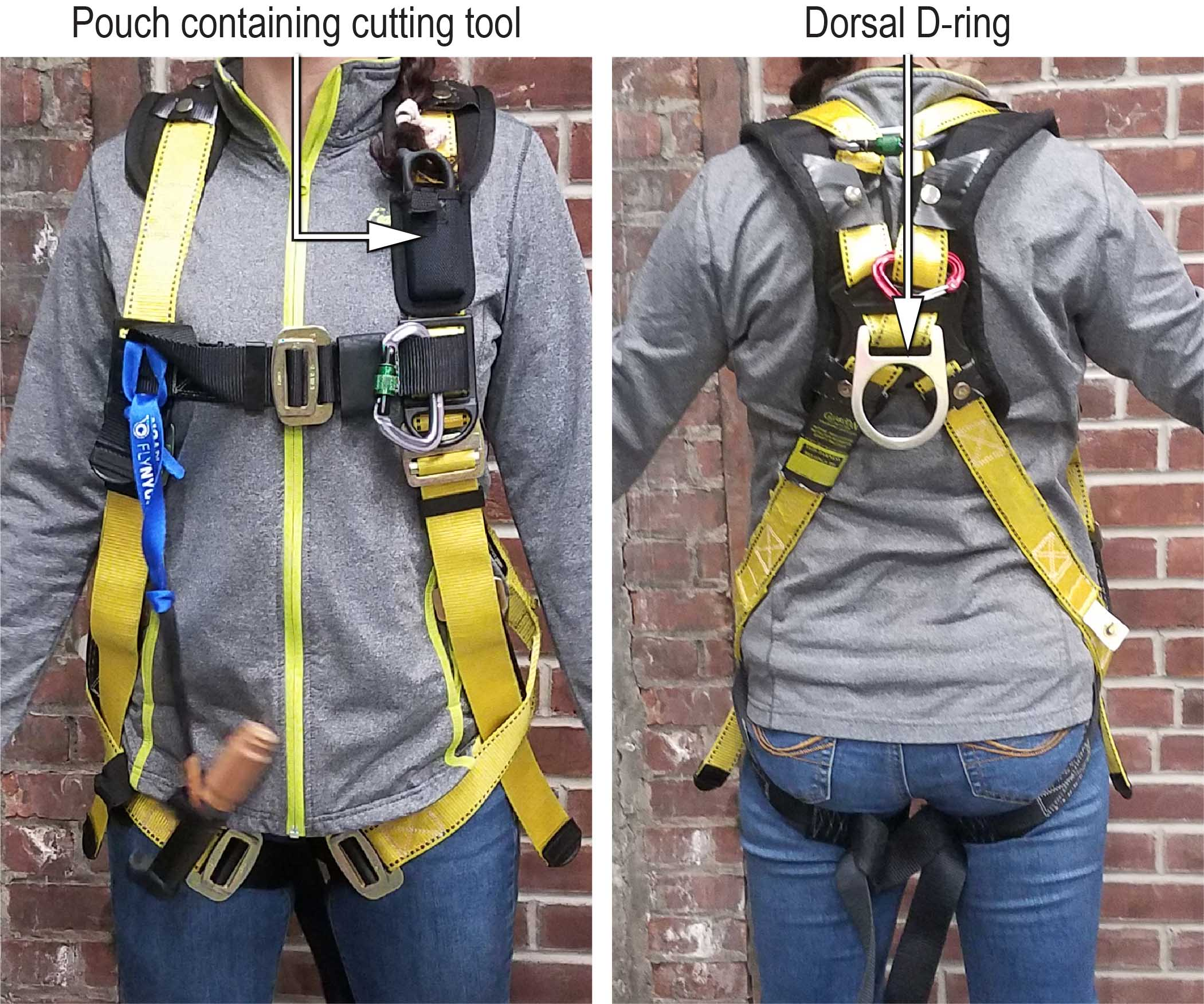
Exemplar NYONair yellow nylon supplemental harness; cutting tool is secured in a pouch on a shoulder strap, and the restraint tether is attached to the dorsal d-ring.

Passengers were provided with a hook-shaped seat belt cutter to sever the restraint tether in case of an emergency, but internal testing in November 2017 demonstrated how difficult it was to use that tool on the restraint tethers used in flight, which were made using the ultra-high-molecular-weight polyethylene branded Dyneema. In February, a pilot for Liberty identified a different knife and tether that could be cut "very easily" as well as a supplier that had more than fifty of each in stock, but social media postings by FlyNYON passengers showed the older tethers and cutters were still in use up to the fatal flight. When discussing the restraint system used on the accident flight, NTSB Chairman Robert Sumwalt said: "The contraption that FlyNYON rigged up turned a perfectly good helicopter into a death trap."

=== Skid floats ===
Although the Airbus AS350 B2 helicopter is not certified for ditching in water, it can be equipped with an emergency flotation system; in this case, the helicopter was equipped with a system manufactured by Dart Aerospace, type certificate SR00470LA. To prevent inadvertent activation, a shear pin is designed to break under 12 pounds-force (53 N) of force; the activator is installed on the cyclic control lever. The flotation system was installed by EuroTec Canada in 2013.

Subsequent evaluation of the wreck showed the right-side floats for the emergency flotation system were not as inflated as the left-side floats. The float system must operate flawlessly according to specification and certification. The post-crash examination of N350LH showed the left skid emergency float's pressurized gas cylinder gauge indicated about 0 psi (0 kPa) while the right skid's pressurized gas cylinder gauge indicated about 4,000 psi (28,000 kPa), implying the right side had failed to fully inflate. According to the NTSB report: "The trigger mechanism was smooth with no evidence of binding. Continuity of the float system control was established between the trigger, dual cable block, and the activation cable clevis connection. When the trigger was released, the dual cable block returned to its normal position (via spring within the junction box) but the upper and lower turnbuckles remained in their actuated positions."

=== FlyNYON and Liberty ===
FlyNYON is a spinoff of NY On Air (NYONair), which was founded by Patrick Day Jr. in 2012 to coordinate aerial photography flights for professional and corporate photographers. FlyNYON sold single-seat tickets for aerial photography flights, reducing the per-passenger cost to facilitate access to doors-off photography flights for tourists. FlyNYON marketed its services via social media by encouraging passengers to post pictures with the hashtag #ShoeSelfie, where the photographer's shoes could be seen in an aerial photograph. Day is the son of the director of operations for Liberty Helicopters. Patrick Day Sr. simultaneously held the director of operations position for FlyNYON, and Patrick Jr. was listed as the VP of charter and aircraft management for Liberty.

A safety video was shown to the passengers, which included a segment on how to release the supplemental harness in case of an emergency. The video demonstrated one passenger helping another passenger to disengage the locking carabiner and also stated that a cutting tool was secured to a chest strap and could be used to cut the tether if necessary; the video showed the passenger cutting the tether with a single stroke. Pilots were concerned about the adequacy of the cutting tools, and in one test, took more than 30 seconds to cut through a tether with the tools available to passengers.

NYONair performed an independent investigation and made the following recommendations:

For FAA

1. The FAA should require Airbus Helicopters to mandate the installation of a collective guard on all AS350B2 helicopters to protect against the possibility of inadvertent fuel control activation.
2. The FAA should issue an immediate Airworthiness Directive to Dart to address and correct the known design deficiencies in the STC 0045LA emergency flotation system.
3. The FAA should perform new certification testing for STC SR0047LA to determine whether it meets the relevant provisions of 14 CFR 27 and ensure that the system is capable of providing sufficient inflation for safe evacuation in the event that one of the two reservoir assemblies fails to activate.
4. The FAA should review the certification testing for STC SR00831LA to determine whether it meets the relevant provisions of 14 CFR 27 and ensure that the system is capable of providing sufficient inflation for safe evacuation in the event that one of the two reservoir assemblies fails to activate.

For Dart Aerospace

1. Redesign and recertify STC SR0047LA to ensure that (a) both reservoirs activate in tandem, and (b) all flotation bags inflate symmetrically and with sufficient pressure to ensure buoyancy stability.
2. Provide adequate warnings to operators/pilots of aircraft that incorporate STC SR0047LA that (a) it is necessary to pull the float actuation handle to its full travel to ensure that both reservoir assemblies have been actuated, and (b) that if only a single reservoir assembly is actuated for any reason that the cross-feed hose will not prevent asymmetrical inflation of the floats that will result in inadequate stability to allow for the safe egress of the aircraft.

== Aftermath ==
The family of one victim sued FlyNYON and Liberty Helicopters on March 14, alleging that it was impossible for passengers to free themselves from their harnesses during an emergency. The lawsuit was later amended to add Airbus as a defendant. In September 2024, a jury awarded $116 million to the victim's family, apportioning the liability as follows: 42% with FlyNYON, 38% with Liberty Helicopters, and 20% to Dart Aerospace.

According to NTSB safety recommendations A-10-129 and -130, issued on October 20, 2010, the design of the emergency fuel shutoff lever in the Eurocopter AS350 cockpit "allows for easy access to and inadvertent movement of (the lever), which could cause a serious or catastrophic accident if the movement occurs at a critical point during flight or on the ground." Airbus (then Eurocopter) had previously reviewed the design of the fuel cutoff lever prior to the safety recommendation and developed a new design, but the FAA did not require a retrofit of the new design.

On March 19, NTSB issued Aviation Safety Recommendation ASR-18-02 to the Federal Aviation Administration (FAA). ASR-18-02 recommends the prohibition of all open-door passenger flights that use additional passenger harness systems, unless the harness system is designed to allow passengers to "rapidly release the harness with minimal difficulty and without having to cut or forcefully remove the harness." The FAA released a statement on March 20 saying they intended to impose a ban on open-door passenger flights that use harnesses which could not be released quickly. Emergency Order of Prohibition 8900.456 (FAA-2018-0243; 83 FR 12856) was issued by the FAA on March 23, effective for one year, prohibiting "doors-off" flights with supplemental passenger restraint systems unless those systems have FAA approval through Form 337. 8900.456 was superseded by 8900.457 in April 2018; 8900.457 in turn was superseded by 8900.506, which renewed the ban on doors-off flights for another year starting in April 2019.

The NTSB adopted Aircraft Accident Report (AAR) 19–04 on December 10, 2019. AAR 19-04 concluded the pilot had successfully ditched the helicopter into the water in a survivable manner using an autorotative descent; however, the supplemental restraints provided by NYONair prevented the passengers from exiting the helicopter after it turned over and sank, causing them to drown. In addition, the supplemental restraint was the immediate cause of the accident; one restraint caught on and caused an inadvertent activation of the fuel shutoff lever, resulting in a loss of power.

== See also ==
- 2009 Hudson River mid-air collision
- 2025 Hudson River helicopter crash
