= Julia Williams =

Julia Williams may refer to:

- Julia Williams (abolitionist) (1811–1870), American abolitionist
- Julia Frances Curry Williams (1826–1911), lighthouse keeper in California
- Julia Williams, poet 2004 in poetry
- Julia Williams, nurse and candidate in the United States House of Representatives elections in Michigan, 2010
