= Leadbetter Beach =

Beach in Santa Barbara, California, U.S.

- Beach / Sand spit
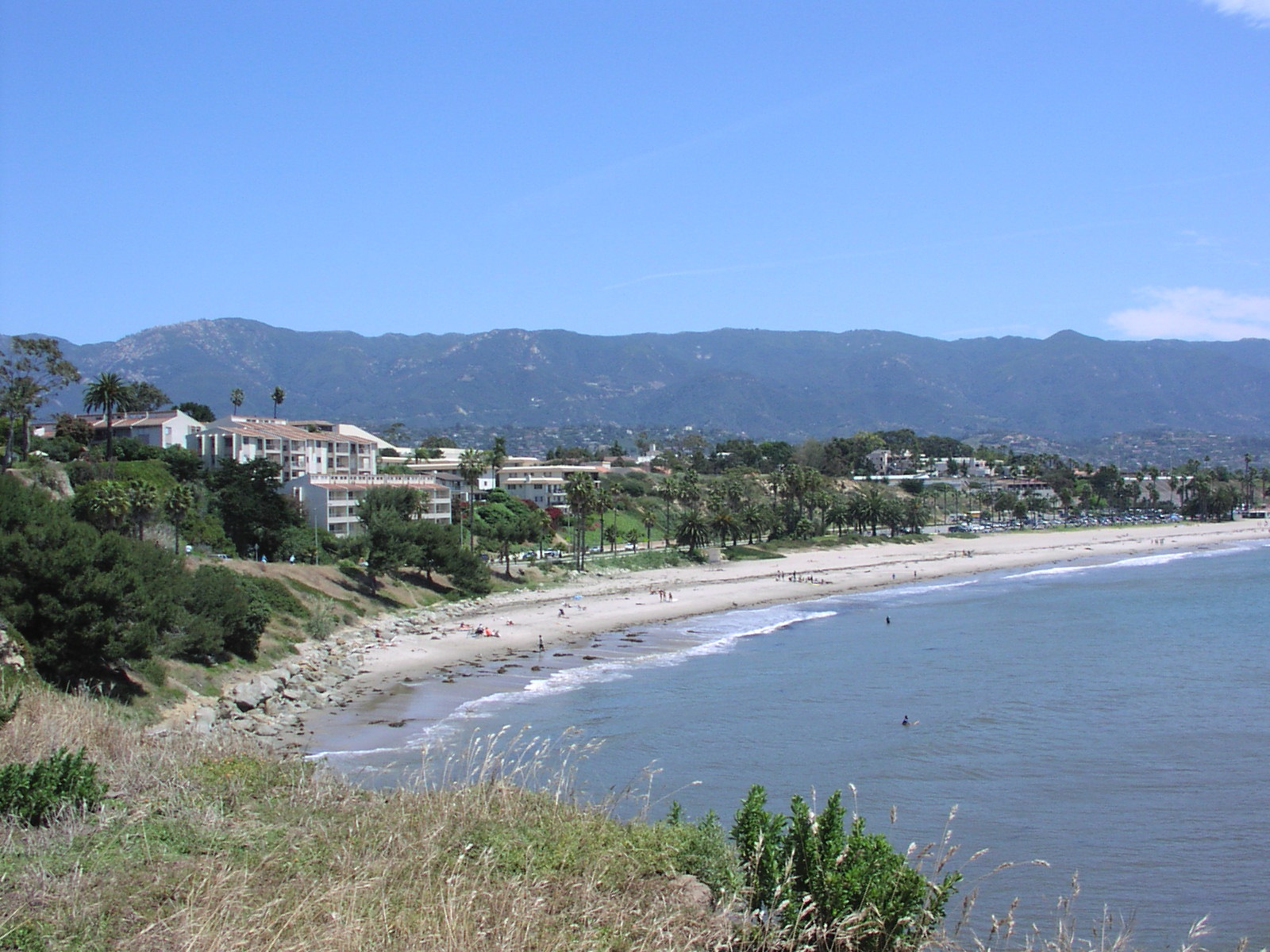
- Leadbetter Beach from Shoreline Park, Santa Barbara, California
- Interactive map of Leadbetter Beach
- Coordinates: 34°24′09″N 119°41′46″W
- Location: Santa Barbara, California, U.S.
- Water bodies: Santa Barbara Channel / Pacific Ocean
- Formed by: Interruption of littoral drift by the construction of the Santa Barbara Harbor
- Operator: City of Santa Barbara Parks and Recreation Department

Dimensions
  - Length: 0.5–0.75 miles (0.80–1.21 km)

Leadbetter Beach (also Ledbetter Beach) is a popular beach in Santa Barbara, California, situated below Leadbetter Hill.

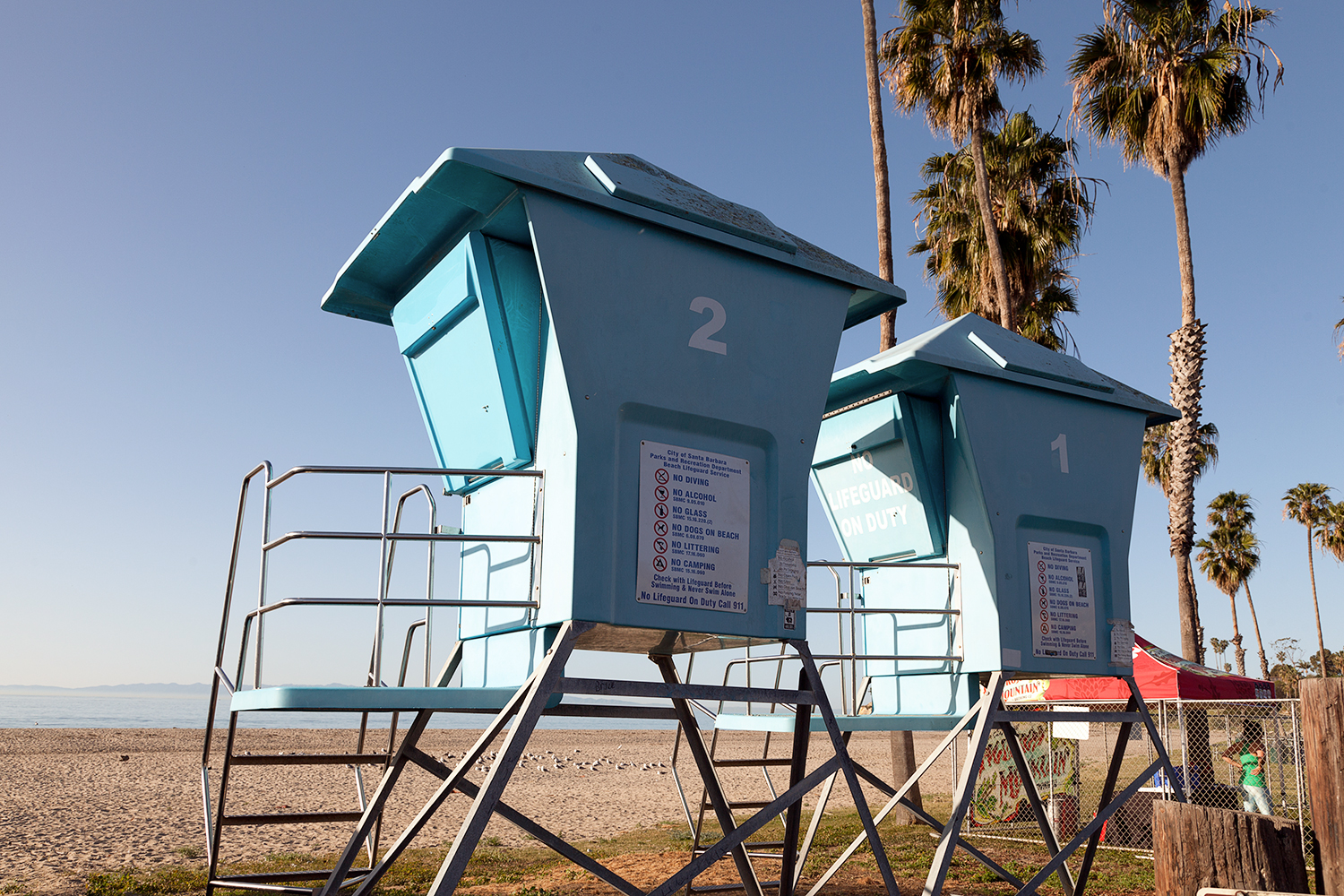
Lifeguard Towers on Leadbetter Beach

It is easily accessible from the Santa Barbara City College (SBCC) and the marina, and has light surf which is acceptable for learners. Because of the small surf and consistent winds, it is also a popular location for kitesurfers and windsurfers during the summer, when the wind is consistent. Of all the beaches in the city, this is one of the most frequently visited.

"Leadbetter is an artificial beach, built by accident. When Santa Barbara Harbor was built, it blocked the downshore current, holding up the natural sand flow. The college is built on the original coastline's front cliffs, now about 30 yards off-shore; the original beach front lies where the current SBCC football field is located. The blocking of sand from downshore cities prompted several lawsuits against Santa Barbara."
