= Naval Reserve Center Santa Barbara =

Coordinates: 34.40396°N 119.69420°W

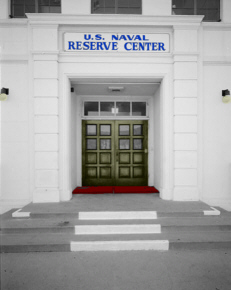

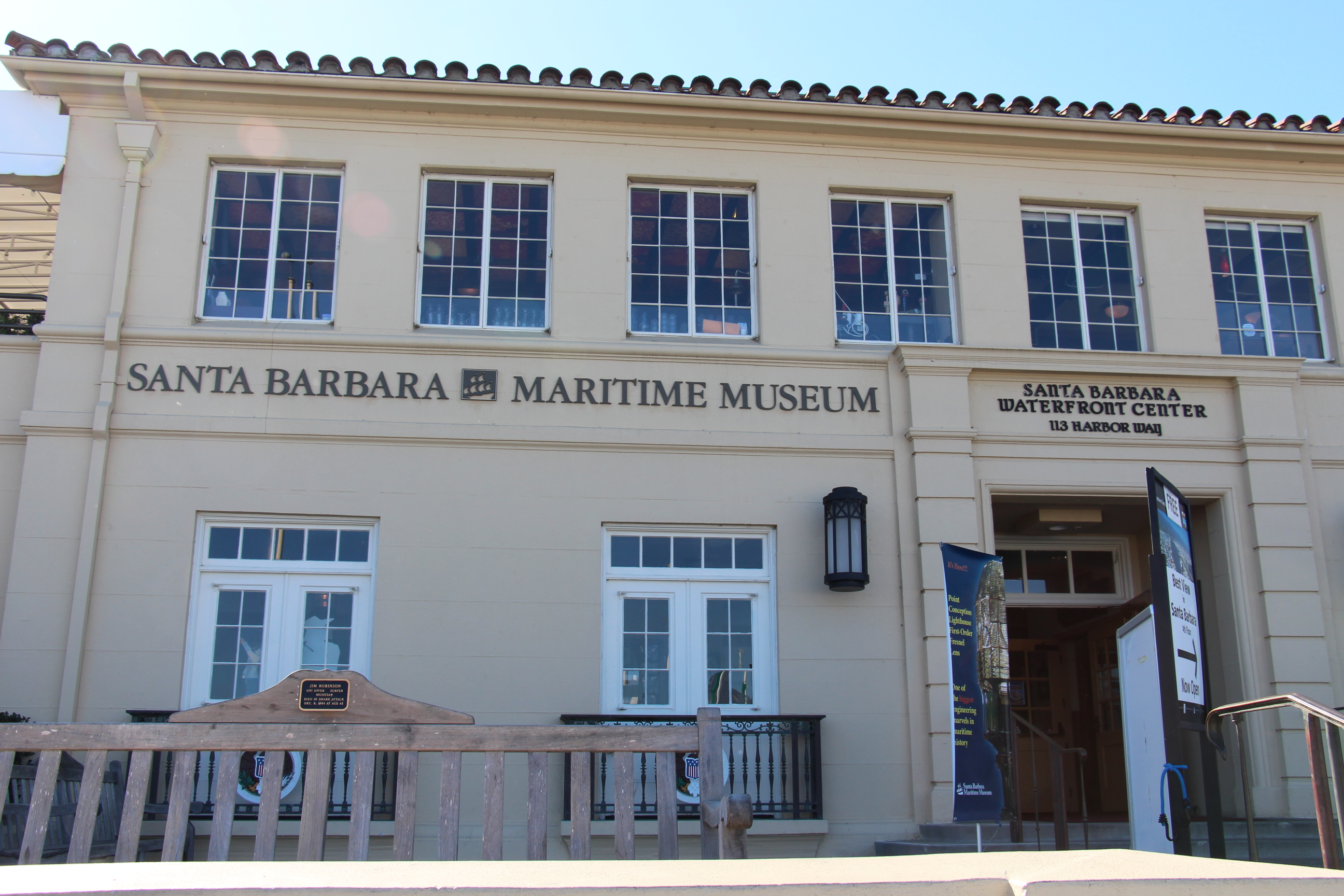
Santa Barbara Maritime Museum

The Naval Reserve Center building in Santa Barbara, California is the location of the Santa Barbara Maritime Museum along with other uses.

== History ==
In 1897, a small group of Santa Barbara, California citizens organized the Sixth Division of the California Naval militia to provide coastal defense for the central coast area. In those days, the Division conducted drills, knotting and splicing exercises, and honed their gunnery skills aboard visiting US Navy ships. During this period the division continued to expand, and, when called to active duty in World War I, it consisted of 123 enlisted and four officers.

In November, 1941, the Sixth Division was called to active duty during World War II. Reporting aboard the USS Mount Vernon, a troop transport, they completed more than a dozen trips around the world, from the US to New Zealand, Singapore, and other ports until the War's end.

Located in the Santa Barbara waterfront area at 113 Harbor Way, the Naval Reserve Center Santa Barbara, originally known as the Naval Reserve Armory, was built for the Navy by the Federal Government's Works Project Administration (WPA). In 1939 the City of Santa Barbara had deeded the land to the Navy with the customary $1.00 payment to make the contract legal. The City transferred the land to the Navy because city leaders and many others in the community felt strongly that a Naval Reserve Armory would be beneficial to Santa Barbara. Local Reservists had already used their Navy training to help their community in many ways - from aiding in recovery efforts following a disastrous earthquake, to participating in neighborhood improvement efforts and a variety of other community activities.

The City Fathers also believed that the building itself, with its large assembly hall and classrooms, could be of benefit to the community. This proved to be true; in 1958 the Center's commanding officer reported "In a disaster the Naval Reserve Center is equipped to aid in civil defense. It has a stand-by generator capable of supplying sufficient power to operate its shop, radio station, and the Reserve Center itself, if the shore power should be cut off. A dispensary and a large area where cots can be place for disaster victims is available." Over the years facilities at the Naval Reserve Center were used by Santa Barbara City College, UC Santa Barbara, youth groups, a high-level scientific conference, and for numerous other activities of benefit to the community. It was also the home of Santa Barbara's first maritime museum, the Santa Barbara Naval and Maritime Museum, founded in 1982 by Lieutenant Commander Douglas Stouffer, commanding officer of the Naval Reserve Center.

The Armory was about 90% complete at the entry of the US into World War II. All construction was abandoned and the building - without windows or plumbing - was boarded up. In 1942, the City of Santa Barbara leased 0.9 acres of the harbor to the Federal Government for the construction of a Navy wharf used in conjunction with a degaussing range offshore. The following year several Naval Reservists were ordered to active duty to put the Armory building in shape, and the facility was designated Small Craft Training Center, Santa Barbara and used for a minesweeping school. Photos from the period show a number of destroyers and sub-chasers tied up to Navy Pier. (Note: In 1959 the Federal Government transferred Navy Pier to the City of Santa Barbara.) Members of the Sixth Division moved from the basement of the Santa Barbara County Courthouse to the Naval Armory. They were again called for duty during the Korean and Vietnam Wars.

In 1945 the Small Craft Training Center was decommissioned, and the building was designated as United States Naval Reserve Armory, Santa Barbara. By 1948 the major work in the building had shifted from armory activities to the training of the reserves, so the facility was upgraded to Naval Reserve Training Center. For many years, local Naval Reservists - men and (after 1957) women, served there. Their training and service in the Naval Reserve benefited their communities as well as their country.

In the mid-1990s - after lengthy negotiations - the Navy sold the Reserve Center to the City of Santa Barbara for $2.4 million. A celebration was held on December 2, 1994, in which the city commemorated the closing of the center by staging a party with a World War II theme. Actress (and local resident) Jane Russell was among the 500 guests. In January 1995 the Navy ended its tenure at the Naval Reserve Center with a decommissioning ceremony. The command moved to a new facility on the Seabee base at Port Hueneme (which – along with the Navy base at Point Mugu – is now known as Naval Base Ventura County). The former Naval Reserve Center building now houses the Santa Barbara Maritime Museum, a restaurant, and offices.

== Santa Barbara Maritime Museum ==
The Santa Barbara Maritime Museum focuses on the discovery and exploration of the Santa Barbara Channel and the area's maritime heritage. Exhibits include area lighthouses and artifacts, including the Point Conception Lighthouse Fresnel lens, area fishing and diving industries, surfing, the Honda Point disaster in WW II, marine safety agencies, ranching on Santa Cruz, Santa Rosa and San Miguel Islands, and shipwrecks.
