= Santa Barbara Light =

Lighthouse in California, United States

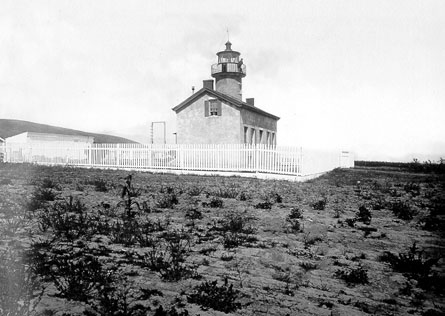
- The first Light by U.S. Coast Guard Archive
- Location: Santa Barbara; California; United States
- Coordinates: 34.396320°N 119.722625°W

Tower
- Constructed: 1856 (firsti)
- Construction: metal tower
- Height: 24 feet (7.3 m)
- Shape: square tower with beacon and no lantern
- Markings: white tower
- Operator: United States Coast Guard

Light
- First lit: 1935 (current)
- Deactivated: 1925 (first)
- Focal height: 142 feet (43 m)
- Lens: Fourth order Fresnel lens
- Characteristic: Fl W 10s

Santa Barbara Lighthouse was a lighthouse in California, United States, on the Santa Barbara Harbor, California.

== History ==
When Santa Barbara Lighthouse was established on December 1, 1856, it was typical of the other pioneer West Coast lights, with the tower rising through the center of the dwelling. The builder was George D. Nagle of San Francisco who received $8,000 for his efforts. The tower lantern was fitted with a fourth order lens and originally displayed a fixed red light, which in later years was changed to fixed white.

- Historical Information by United States Coast Guard:

Women lighthouse keepers were not uncommon in early American lighthouses. Santa Barbara is a premier example. When the lighthouse was officially established in 1856, Albert Johnson Williams was appointed as the initial keeper. After nine years of operating the facility he grew tired of his routine chores and handed over the duties to his wife. She proved so adept at keeping a good house that the government made it official on June 5, 1865, with the appointment receiving a great amount of publicity in the locality. Taking great pride in her work, Mrs. Julia F. Williams kept at her duties for more than 40 years during which time she was only away from the lighthouse on two nights. During her faithful vigil only one shipwreck of consequence was recorded, the cause of which was carelessness on the part of the skipper who allowed his vessel to drift on the rocks. Julia Williams was a descendant of a Maine family and she had come to California with her husband during the gold rush era. She raised three boys and two girls at the lighthouse. In 1905, her vigil finally ended when she fell from a couch and broke her hip. She was 81 years old when she was relieved by another woman, a Mrs. Jones.

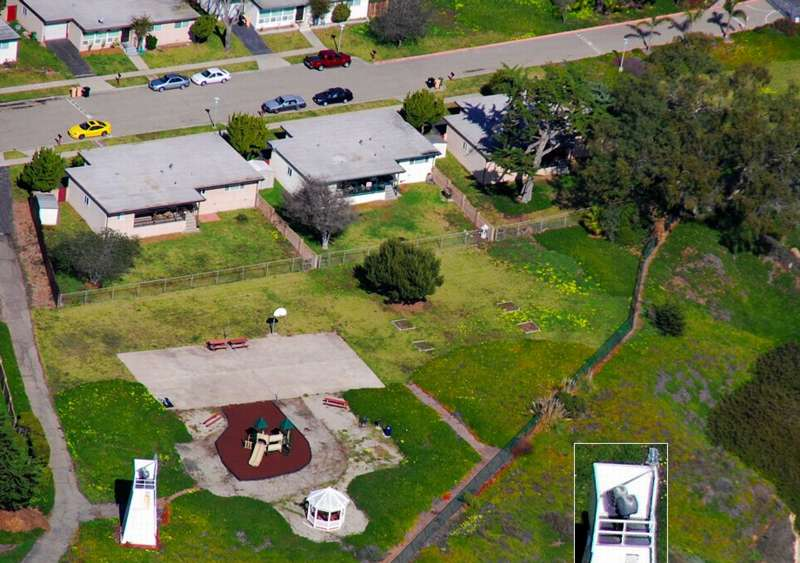
2009 aerial photo

On June 29, 1925, a severe earthquake jolted the area and the aging lighthouse was unable to stand against it. It was 6:45 a.m. and keeper Weeks was asleep at the time. Suddenly and rudely awakened, he rushed from the dwelling, then hurried back inside to rescue his mother, sister, and brother. When the cloud of dust had settled, little was left of the old structure. A temporary frame tower was erected until a new lighthouse could be built.

The current light is on a bluff at 34.396320°N 119.722625°W, inside a fenced Coast Guard compound with housing and a playground. It is visible from Shoreline Drive and the La Mesa Park pedestrian bridge.

== Keepers ==
- Albert J. Williams (1856 – 1860)
- Rafiel Guirado (1860)
- Charles Talma (1860 – 1861)
- Samuel Robert J. Sturgeon (1861 – 1865)
- Julia Frances Curry Williams (1865 – 1905)
- Caroline Morse (1905 – 1911)
- George A. Hussey (1911 – 1913)
- Harley Alonzo Weeks (1913 – 1925)
- Caroline Weeks (1925)
- Raymond H. Weeks (1925 – 1943)

== See also ==
- List of lighthouses in the United States
