= 2025 Hudson River helicopter crash =

Helicopter accident in New Jersey

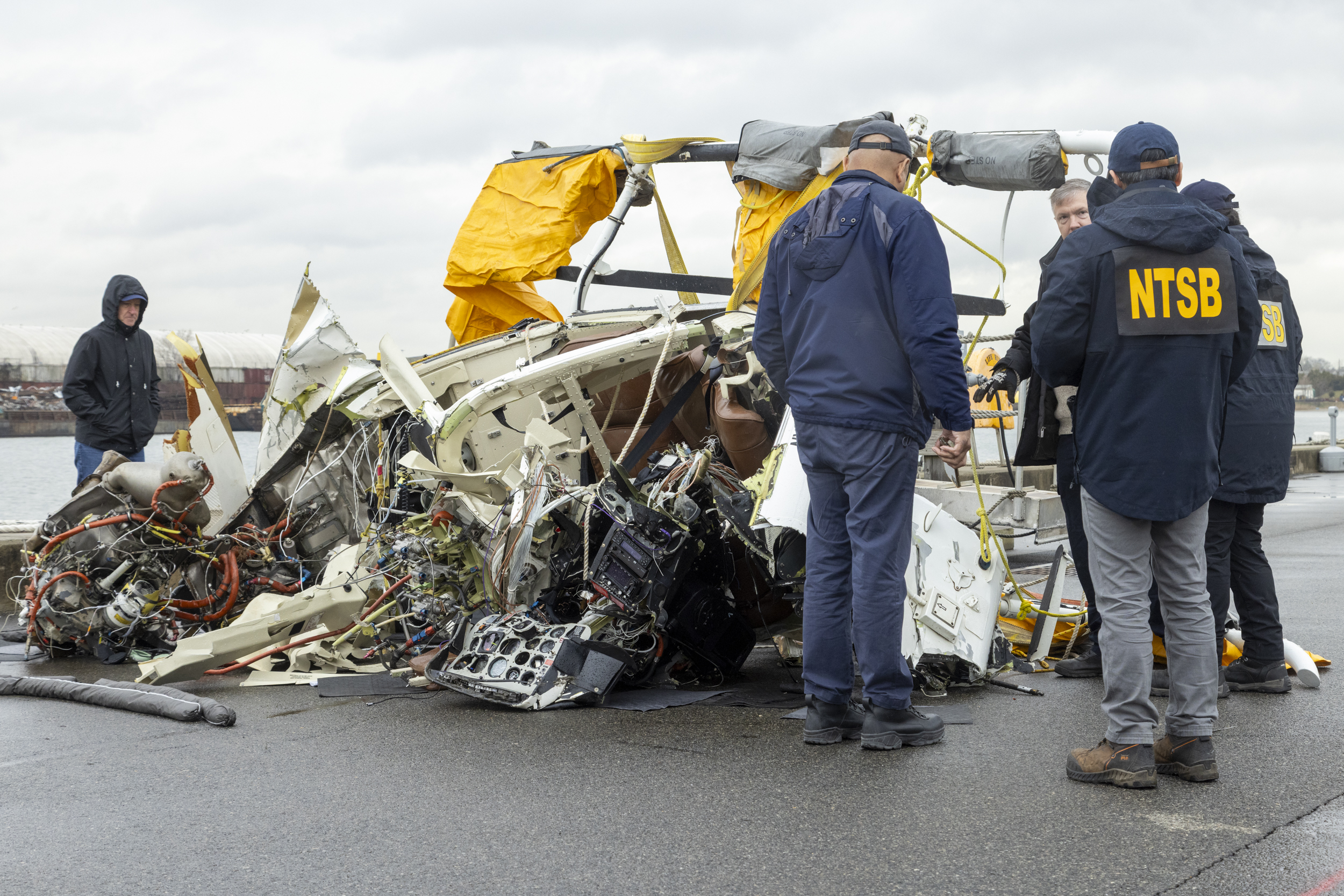
- NTSB investigators surveying wreckage of the helicopter

Accident
- Date: April 10, 2025
- Summary: In-flight breakup; under investigation
- Site: Jersey City, New Jersey, U.S.; 40°43′45″N 74°1′38″W

Aircraft
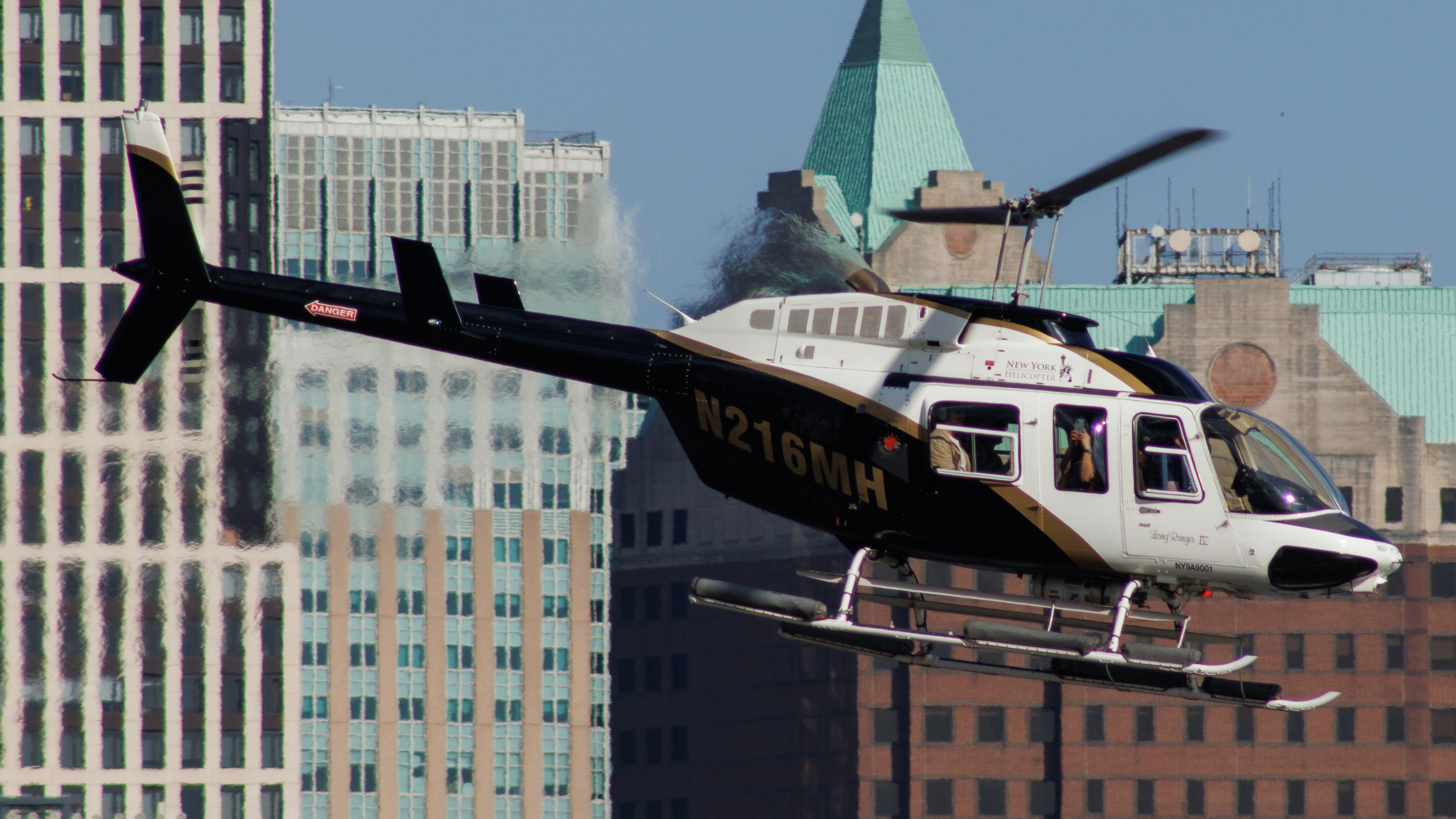
- N216MH, the helicopter involved in the accident, pictured in 2024
- Aircraft type: Bell 206 LongRanger IV
- Operator: New York Helicopter
- IATA flight No.: NY39
- ICAO flight No.: NYH39
- Call sign: NEW YORK 39
- Registration: N216MH
- Flight origin: Downtown Manhattan Heliport, New York City, U.S.
- Destination: Downtown Manhattan Heliport
- Occupants: 6
- Passengers: 5
- Crew: 1
- Fatalities: 6
- Survivors: 0

On April 10, 2025, a Bell 206 helicopter on an afternoon sightseeing tour crashed into the Hudson River near Jersey City, New Jersey, United States, across the river from New York City. All six onboard—a family of five and the pilot—were killed. Operated by New York Helicopter, the aircraft was on its eighth flight of the day when its tail boom failed and initiated a mid-air breakup at 3:15 p.m. In July 2026, investigators reported that multiple geese struck the helicopter; the investigation was continuing.

== Background ==
=== Aircraft ===
The aircraft involved in the accident was a Bell 206 LongRanger IV (L-4). Local excursion company New York Helicopter Charter Inc. was leasing the aircraft from Louisiana company Meridian Helicopters. According to Federal Aviation Administration (FAA) records, it was built in 2004 and had an airworthiness certificate issued in 2016 that was valid until 2029. The helicopter's last major inspection was on March 1, 2025. The Bell 206 L-4 model is powered by the Rolls-Royce Model 250-C30P turboshaft engine.

=== Passengers and crew ===
Six people were on board the helicopter. The passengers were a family of five from Barcelona, Catalonia, Spain, consisting of Agustín Escobar, Global CEO of Rail Infrastructure at Siemens Mobility, and Mercè Camprubí Montal, Global Head of Siemens Energy Digital Commercialization, and their three children, Agustín, Mercè and Victor (aged 10, 8, and 4). The pilot was 36-year-old Navy veteran Seankese Johnson.

=== Weather ===
According to a weather station around the time of the crash, winds were 9 to 12 mph (14 to 19 km/h) from the south and southeast, with occasional gusts up to 21 mph (34 km/h). Visibility at the surface was good for up to 10 mi (16 km) but it was cloudy as a low-pressure system moved into the region, bringing light rain in the afternoon and evening.

=== Operator ===
The operator of the helicopter was local excursion company New York Helicopter, which has also been known as New York Helicopter Charter Inc. and New York Helicopter Tours LLC. The company was founded in the 1990s by Michael Roth. New York Helicopter had prior flight accidents from mechanical failures in 2013 and 2015, without serious injuries. Over the last eight years, "the company has been through a bankruptcy and faces ongoing lawsuits over alleged debts", according to the Associated Press. In January, the company was sued for over US$1.4 million for non-payment of a helicopter lease. Another lender sued in February, saying the company "had blocked repayments on a weeks-old loan and owed over $83,000." At the time of the April crash, New York Helicopter had not filed a response in either case.

== Accident ==
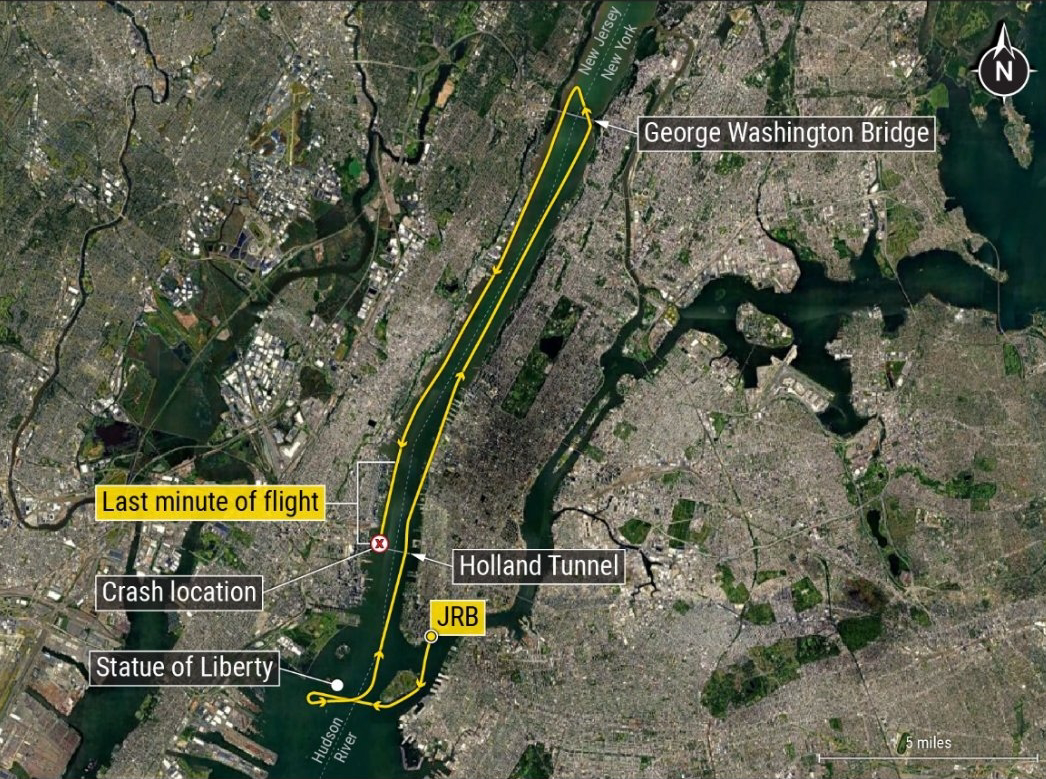
Flight path before the crash (NTSB)

At 2:59 p.m. EDT (UTC−04:00), the helicopter took off from the Downtown Manhattan Heliport (officially renamed "Downtown Skyport" days earlier, identifier JRB) on its eighth flight of the day. It traveled along the southern part of Manhattan (Governors Island) and circled near the Statue of Liberty before flying up the Hudson River along the western side of Manhattan. At 3:08 p.m., the helicopter turned around near the George Washington Bridge before flying south along the New Jersey shoreline. The pilot radioed to say that he was returning to the heliport to refuel.

About 16 minutes into the flight at 3:15 p.m., the helicopter experienced an in-flight breakup. The main rotor broke off, causing the fuselage to fall and crash upside-down into the river near the Newport neighborhood of Jersey City, New Jersey, opposite Manhattan's Pier 40 and just north of the Holland Tunnel. The fuselage landed in 5-foot (1.5 m) deep waters, while other pieces landed in 75-foot (23 m) deep waters.

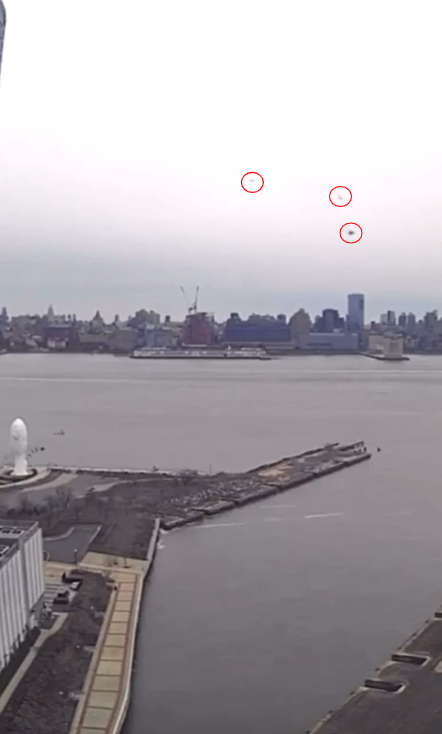
A CCTV still of the helicopter broken into three pieces, with Jersey City's Newport Pier in the foreground, Manhattan's Pier 40 in the background

Witnesses described hearing loud noises before seeing the helicopter break apart mid-air and fall into the river. Emergency responders arrived to find the helicopter submerged. The water temperature was 50 °F (10 °C). All six victims of the crash were quickly recovered. Four were pronounced dead at the scene, while two others succumbed to their injuries at Jersey City Medical Center.

== Investigation ==
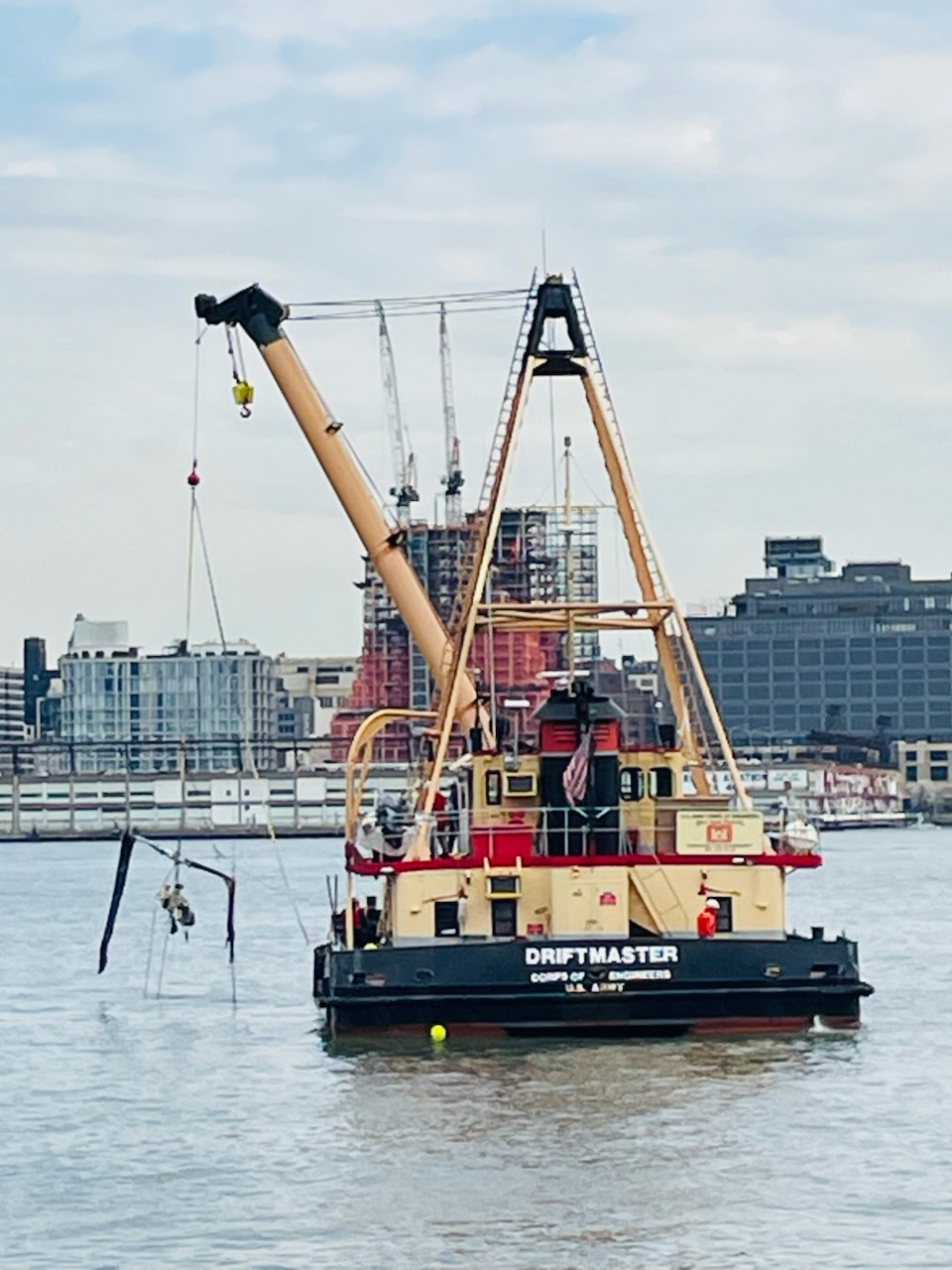
Helicopter recovery by the U.S. Army Corps of Engineers

The FAA immediately began investigating the crash along with the NTSB, Bell Textron and Rolls-Royce. The NTSB chair and investigators traveled to the site of the crash the same night and held their first media briefing the following day.

The main fuselage with the cockpit and cabin, the forward portion of the tail boom, the horizontal stabilizer finlets and the vertical fin, were recovered on April 11, the day after the crash. Recovery efforts concluded on April 14 after divers using side-scanning sonar recovered the helicopter's main rotor, main gear box, tail rotor and a large portion of the tail boom. Some of the recovered parts were sent to the NTSB laboratories in Washington for closer inspection.

The helicopter was not equipped with any flight recorders. No onboard video recorders or camera recorders were recovered and none of the helicopter avionics onboard recorded information that could be used for the investigation.

NTSB investigators met with representatives from the helicopter's operator, New York Helicopter, to review operational records, policies and procedures, safety management systems and the pilot's experience. Investigators also examined two exemplar helicopters.

On May 7, 2025, the NTSB issued a preliminary report that included a description of how the helicopter started breaking up at approximately 675 feet (210 m), based primarily on surveillance video: "Beginning of failure. Fuselage yaws severely with simultaneous tail boom failure."

On July 16, 2026, investigators reported that the remains of multiple geese were found on the helicopter's wreckage, suggesting that bird strikes contributed to the accident. The NTSB expected to make a final determination by year-end 2026.

== Aftermath ==
The FAA temporarily prohibited drone pilots from flying near the crash site unless they had specific authorization.

The CEO of New York Helicopter, Michael Roth, fired his director of operations, minutes after the director agreed to comply voluntarily with an FAA request to suspend operations while the crash was under investigation. Citing the apparent retaliatory action against the director, the FAA issued an emergency suspension of the company's air-carrier certificate. The FAA also announced an immediate review of the company's safety record and license, hours after New York senator Chuck Schumer called for the agency to rescind the license.

== Reactions ==
=== International ===
Spain's prime minister Pedro Sánchez called the incident "an unimaginable tragedy" in a post on X.

=== Domestic ===
President Donald Trump offered condolences to the families and friends of the victims in the helicopter crash, which he described as "terrible" in a message on Truth Social. He also said that transportation secretary Sean Duffy and his staff were investigating and that "announcements as to exactly what took place, and how, will be made shortly".

New York City mayor Eric Adams said "Our hearts go out to the families of those who were onboard".

CEO Roth said "we are devastated" over the crash. He explained that the company has a director of maintenance who would have overseen the condition of the helicopter.

In August 2025, New Jersey governor Phil Murphy asked the FAA to "prohibit or sharply reduce" non-essential helicopter flights over the state, after one heliport promised local officials to reduce flights. When the victims' relatives visited the crash site for the one-year anniversary in April 2026, New York congressional representatives led by Jerrold Nadler introduced a bipartisan federal "Helicopter Safety Parity Act" that would hold passenger helicopters to safety standards comparable to commercial airlines.

== See also ==
- 2009 Hudson River mid-air collision
- 2018 New York City helicopter crash
