= Emergency flotation system =

Emergency Flotation Systems (EFS) are emergency systems installed on larger commercial and military helicopters in order to prevent the airframe sinking in the event of a crash landing on water. The floats may be packed within spaces inside the airframe or as externally mounted packs on the helicopter skids. The floats are inflated using gas stored in pressurised cylinders carried on board the helicopter.

== History ==
During normal H-46 operations, hatches and windows are open and upon hard landings the lower plexiglass bubbles in the nose section frequently break. Watertight hull integrity is usually rapidly lost followed by or concurrent with the aircraft rolling over. The H-46 has very little buoyancy in the forward end which is an additional hazard when the aircraft rolls over and rapidly fills with water because the nose sinks first trapping personnel in the aft cabin. Under these conditions of the aircraft rolling over, rapidly filling with water and sinking nosedown, expecially [sic] at night it is nearly impossible for occupants to detach themselves from seat belts and walk-around harness, swim down to the forward escape hatches and push them outward against inrushing water and egress successfully. The design criteria for an emergency flotation system must take into account all of these factors.

— M.J. Reilly, Lightweight Emergency Flotation System for the CH-46 Helicopter (Technical Report NADC-79169-60, Feb 1981)

By 1979, United States Navy and Marine Corps Boeing Vertol CH-46 Sea Knight helicopters had been involved in 64 emergency landings in water. Of the 64, 47 helicopters sunk after landing, killing 75. A study estimated 50% of those fatalities could have been prevented had the helicopters been equipped with adequate emergency flotation. Because helicopters tend to have a high center of gravity due to the high-mounted engine and transmission, even if they are naturally buoyant in the water with hatches secured, they will tend to overturn in heavy sea conditions.

== Regulation ==
In the United States, regulations for ditching aircraft are included in Federal Aviation Regulations Parts 27 (14 CFR 27) and 29 (14 CFR 29), and specific guidance is provided in Advisory circulars 27-1B and 29-2C.

== Design ==
The most rapid inflation is provided by pressurised helium although some float systems use helium blended with other gases such as nitrogen to slow down the inflation rate.
