= Julia Frances Curry Williams =

Lighthouse keeper at Santa Barbara for 40 years

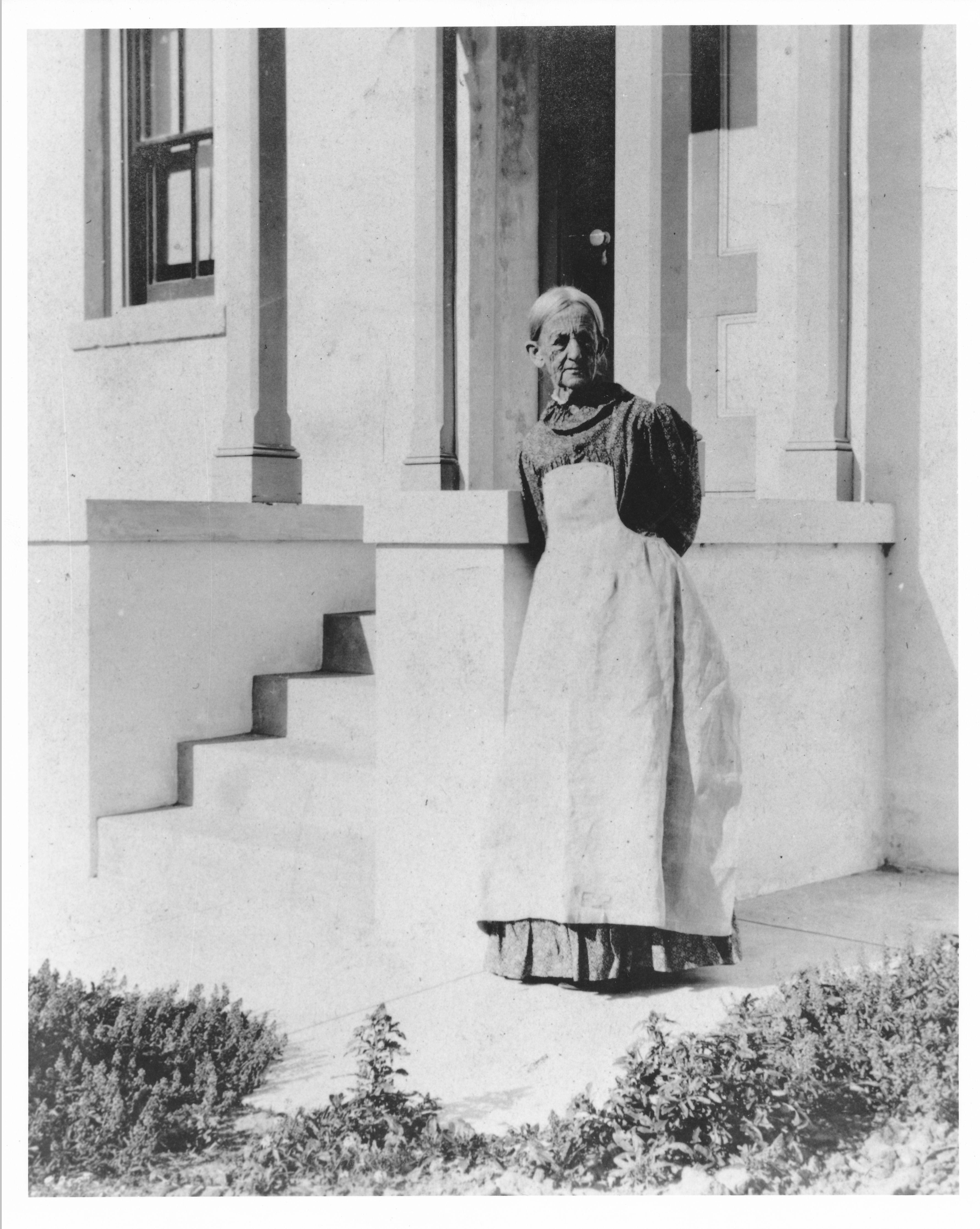
- Julia F. Williams at the Santa Barbara Light
- Born: July 12, 1826; Campobello Island, Canada
- Died: June 30, 1911 (aged 84); Santa Barbara, California
- Resting place: Santa Barbara Cemetery
- Occupation: Lighthouse keeper (1865-1905)
- Children: 6

Julia Frances Curry Williams (1826–1911) was one of the first female lighthouse keepers in California. She served for 40 years at the Santa Barbara Light from 1865 to 1905.

== Early life ==
She was born Julia Frances Curry on Campobello Island, Canada on July 12, 1826, and spent her childhood in Eastport, Maine. In 1848, she married Albert Johnson Williams. The next year, Albert moved to San Francisco during the Gold Rush, and left Julia and their baby behind. In 1853, Julia and her four-year-old daughter sailed to Panama, traveled across the Isthmus on a donkey, and sailed up to San Francisco to reunite with her husband.

== Her lighthouse years ==
In 1856, the Williams family moved to Santa Barbara where Albert was offered the position of keeper for the newly built lighthouse. He only served as keeper for a few years, and after a couple of other keepers came and went, Julia was offered the position in 1865. Her husband moved to the city. There was no well at the lighthouse so, in addition to caring for her six children, Julia had to walk a mile to a spring with her children and a horse, to bring home cans of water. This trip was repeated to obtain firewood. Each night, "she climbed the three flights of stairs at sunset and lighted the lamp. Every night at midnight, the lamp was trimmed or changed for a fresh one, and every morning as the sun touched the mountain tops, the same hand extinguished the light and drew the curtain across the lens and she went about her household duties.” She recorded the amount of oil used for the lamp, how many hours the lamp burned, and the condition of the weather. She also had to wipe all the steps leading up to the light to avoid getting dust on the lenses. Julia treated her position as a calling as well as a job. "When a storm is raging, and a lonely ship is struggling along, aided by my light, I fancy that it is like a soul in the sea of life, buffeted but guided by the light of the sea of Bethlehem."

There was only one shipwreck on the Santa Barbara coast during her tenure as keeper. On a calm moonlit night, a ship captain allowed his vessel to drift too near the shore, and ended up on the rocks.

In 1905, Julia fell and broke her hip. She spent her remaining years in the Cottage Hospital in Santa Barbara. She died on June 30, 1911, and is buried in the Santa Barbara Cemetery.
