= USCGC Blackfin =

United States Coast Guard patrol boat

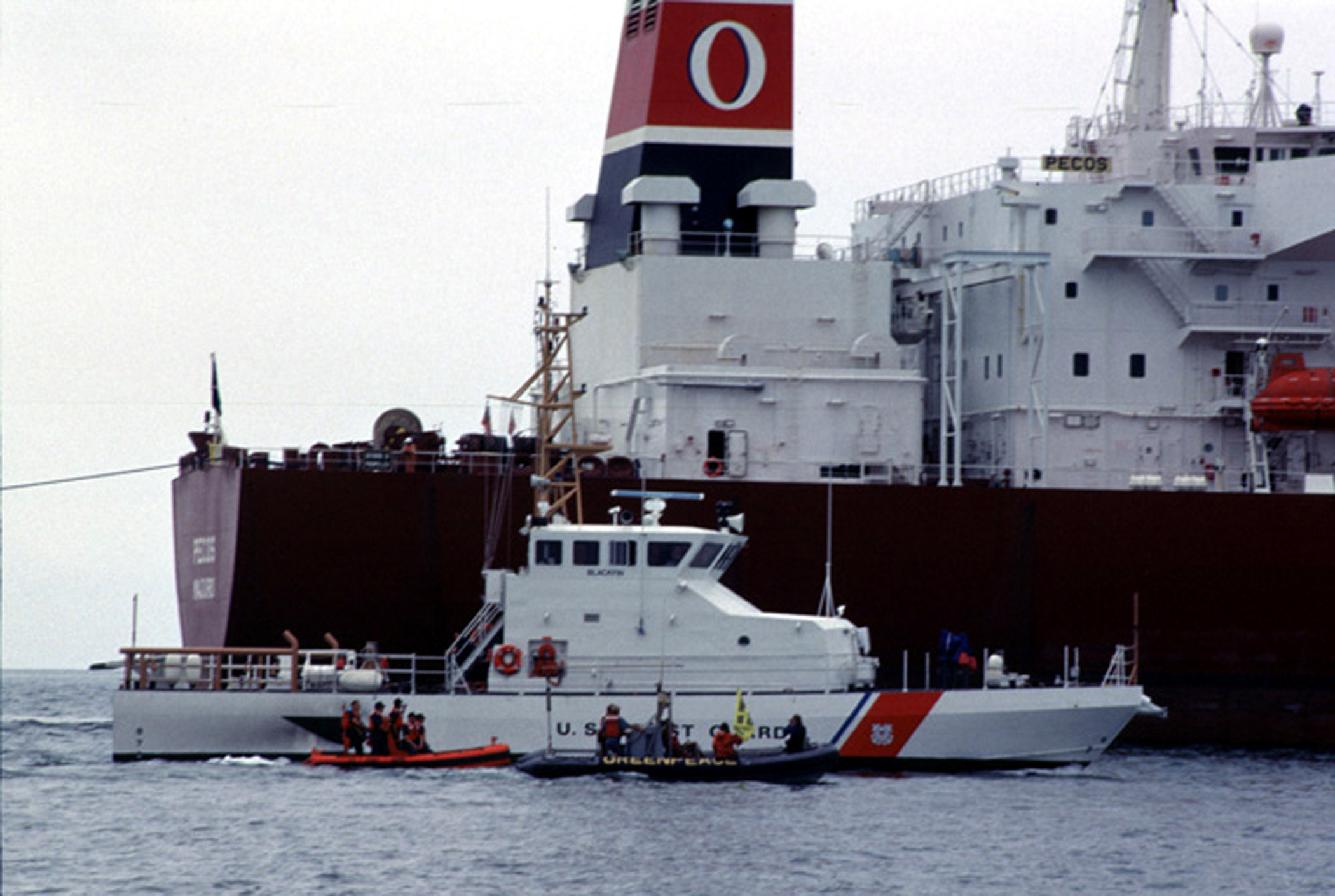
- Blackfin provides a blockage against Greenpeace activists protesting off the coast of Long Beach, California in September 2000.

History

United States
- Name: Blackfin
- Operator: United States Coast Guard
- Builder: Bollinger Shipyards, Lockport, Louisiana
- Commissioned: 2000
- Home port: Santa Barbara Harbor, Santa Barbara, California
- Identification: Hull number: WPB-87317
- Status: In active service
- Badge

General characteristics
- Class & type: Marine Protector-class patrol boat
- Displacement: 100 long tons (100 t)
- Length: 87 ft (27 m)
- Beam: 19.5 ft (5.9 m)
- Speed: 25 knots (46 km/h; 29 mph)
- Range: 900 nautical miles (1,700 km; 1,000 mi)

USCGC Blackfin (WPB-87317) is an 87-foot (27 m) Marine Protector-class patrol boat of the United States Coast Guard. Commissioned in 2000, it is based at Santa Barbara Harbor in Santa Barbara, California and patrols the northern coast of Southern California from Cambria to Malibu, including the Channel Islands. Its work includes search and rescue, law enforcement and migrant interdiction.

== Design ==
The Marine Protector class was built by Bollinger Shipyards of Lockport, Louisiana, under a contract awarded in 1996. As with all boats in the class, the Blackfin is 87 feet (27 m) long and 19.5 feet (5.9 m) wide, with a displacement of 100 long tons, a top speed of 25 knots and a range of 900 nautical miles.

== Service history ==
The crew of Blackfin conducting training during August 2026.

=== Background ===
Santa Barbara has long been a base for small Coast Guard patrol boats. Before Blackfin, the 82-foot Point-class cutter Point Judith was based there from 1973 until it was decommissioned in 1992.

=== Migrant interdictions ===
In March 2012 Blackfin left Santa Barbara Harbor after an anonymous report of a panga adrift. It intercepted the boat with 14 suspected migrants aboard about 10 miles (16 km) west of Point Conception, and the passengers were handed over to the Department of Homeland Security. In February 2015 the Coast Guard and the National Park Service found 15 suspected migrants who had been dropped off on Santa Cruz Island. All 15 were taken aboard Blackfin and carried to Santa Barbara.

=== Central American deployment ===
In 2024 Blackfin and the Sentinel-class cutter Forrest Rednour, based in San Pedro, completed a 49-day deployment in the Eastern Pacific. During it Blackfin led a search and rescue exercise in Manzanillo, Mexico, and its crew met with the Costa Rican Coast Guard in Golfito. The two cutters also held a passing exercise with the Mexican Navy patrol vessel ARM Palenque. Blackfin covered more than 8,300 miles (13,400 km) and logged 800 operational hours. The Coast Guard announced the cutters' return on June 10, 2024.

=== Search and rescue ===
In August 2024 Blackfin joined a boat crew from Coast Guard Station Channel Islands and an MH-60 Jayhawk helicopter from Air Station San Diego in searching for a man who had gone overboard near the Channel Islands. A good Samaritan vessel found him after about 45 minutes in the water.

=== Commanding officers ===
Blackfin is commanded by a junior officer. On June 22, 2023, Lieutenant (junior grade) James Morrison III relieved Lieutenant Christina Sandstedt in a ceremony in Santa Barbara. Morrison came to Blackfin from the cutter Kimball in Honolulu, where he had served as a deck watch officer. In another change of command announced by the Coast Guard, Lieutenant (junior grade) Samuel Severson took command of the cutter. A further change of command took place at the Santa Barbara Yacht Club in June 2025, with Lieutenant (junior grade) Samuel Kim of Sector Los Angeles-Long Beach presiding.

=== Recent operations ===
In September 2025 Coast Guard photographs showed Blackfin leaving Santa Barbara Harbor to patrol the Southern California coast and train its crew, and returning to its homeport afterward. The cutter has also been opened for public tours during the Santa Barbara Harbor & Seafood Festival.

== See also ==
- Santa Barbara Harbor
- List of United States Coast Guard cutters
