= 2009 Hudson River mid-air collision =

Fatal aviation accident

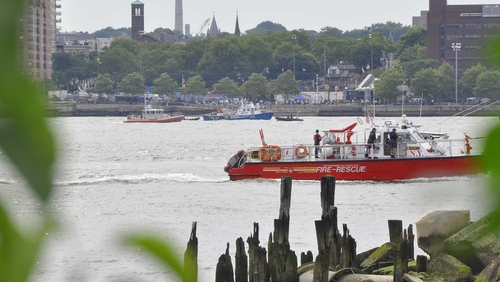
- Agencies searching for the bodies and debris from the collision.

Accident
- Date: August 8, 2009
- Summary: Mid-air collision
- Site: Hudson River; near Hoboken, N.J., across from Manhattan; 40°44′32″N 74°01′21″W
- Total fatalities: 9
- Total survivors: 0

First aircraft
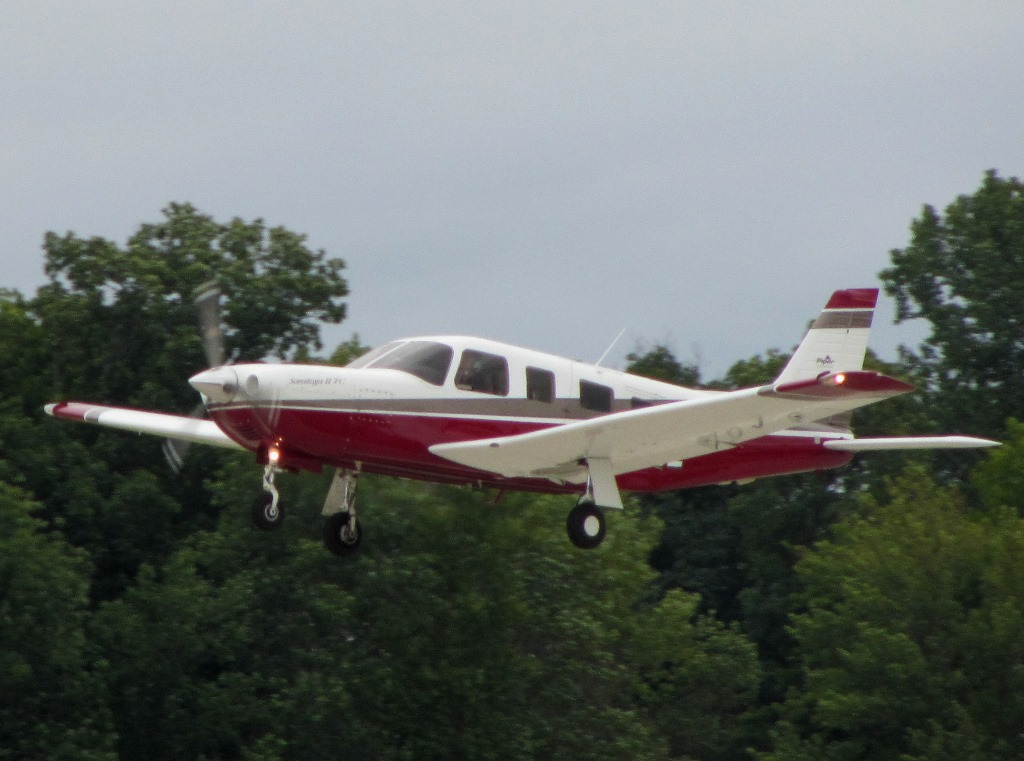
- A Piper PA-32R similar to the one involved in the incident
- Type: Piper PA-32R
- Operator: Private Operator
- Registration: N71MC
- Flight origin: Teterboro Airport, New Jersey, United States
- Destination: Ocean City Municipal Airport, New Jersey, United States
- Occupants: 3
- Passengers: 2
- Crew: 1
- Fatalities: 3
- Survivors: 0

Second aircraft
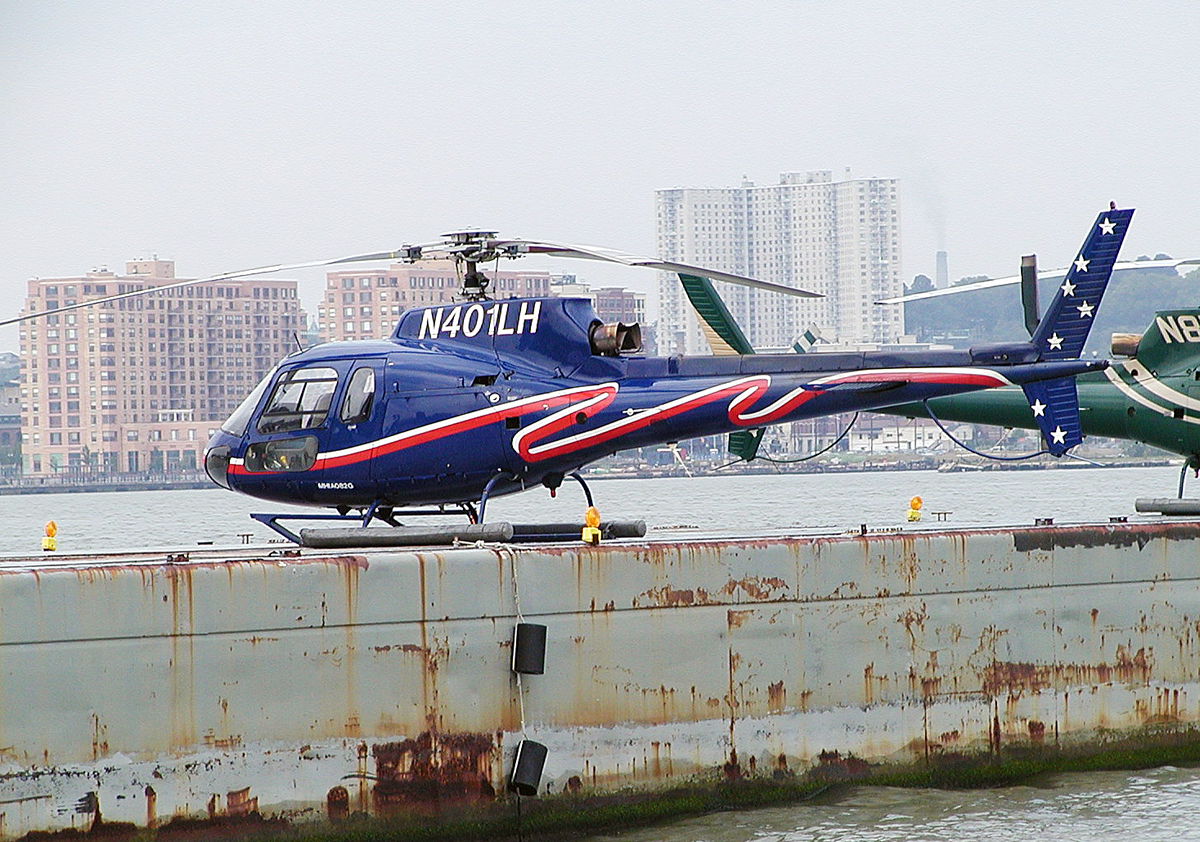
- N401LH, the Eurocopter AS350 involved in the accident in a previous livery in 2002
- Type: Eurocopter AS350
- Operator: Liberty Helicopter Sightseeing Tours
- Registration: N401LH
- Flight origin: West 30th Street Heliport, New York, United States
- Destination: West 30th Street Heliport, New York, United States
- Occupants: 6
- Passengers: 5
- Crew: 1
- Fatalities: 6
- Survivors: 0

On August 8, 2009, at 11:53 a.m. (15:53 UTC), nine people died when a tour Eurocopter AS350 Écureuil helicopter and a small private Piper PA-32R airplane collided over the Hudson River near Frank Sinatra Park in Hoboken, New Jersey, United States. The aircraft were in an area known as the "Hudson River VFR Corridor", which extends from the surface of the river to altitudes of 800 to 1,500 ft (240 to 460 m) at various locations along the Hudson River in the immediate area of New York City. Within this corridor, aircraft operate under visual flight rules (VFR), under which the responsibility to see and avoid other air traffic rests with the individual pilots rather than with the air traffic controller (ATC).

Because of the heavy commercial air traffic into Newark, LaGuardia, and Kennedy airports, an air traffic control clearance is required to operate in much of the airspace around the city. Since ATC is often unwilling to grant this discretionary VFR clearance because of traffic volume, many airplanes that need to transit the New York metro area use the VFR corridor as an alternative to going east of the city (over water) or west (toward Pennsylvania). The corridor is also heavily used by helicopter tour companies, which take passengers on sight-seeing tours of the New York skyline.

== Background ==
Visual flight rules on the river corridors by Manhattan had been subject to considerable debate since the 2006 crash in which New York Yankees pitcher Cory Lidle crashed into an apartment building while flying using visual flight rules on the East River. This was the first aircraft collision over the Hudson River since 1976.

The collision, which occurred opposite 14th Street in Manhattan, was about 2 mi (3.2 km) south of where US Airways Flight 1549 ditched in the Hudson River on January 15, 2009, with no loss of life, after the plane suffered a complete loss of thrust following a bird strike.

== Collision ==
A frame of video taken immediately before the collision

The light aircraft was a 6-seat Piper PA-32R-300 Cherokee Lance built in 1976 and piloted by Steven Altman with two passengers. Altman was given clearance from the tower at Teterboro Airport in Teterboro, New Jersey, at 11:48 a.m. to take off. It departed at 11:49 a.m. and was headed for Ocean City, New Jersey.

The helicopter, a Eurocopter AS350 built in 1997 carrying five Italian tourists and its pilot, took off from the West 30th Street Heliport at 11:52 am. At about the same time, Teterboro tower radioed Altman in the Piper at take-off requesting him to pick his flight path towards Ocean City, and indicate whether he wished to head there via the Hudson River, or take a southwest tack. Altman replied "Either". "Let me know" was the response from the tower, with Altman answering "OK, tell you what, I will take down the river."

Altman was then instructed to contact Newark Liberty International Airport, a directive he agreed to. However, he did not contact the tower at Newark. It later transpired that, in acknowledging the instruction to contact Newark, Altman had read back the wrong frequency (127.8 MHz instead of 127.85), an error that the controller did not correct. Soon after, a controller at Newark who was concerned about aircraft in the Piper's path contacted the Teterboro controller and asked him to attempt to re-establish contact. All attempts to contact Altman and change his aircraft's heading were unsuccessful. After the failure to contact Altman, a radar alert about a possible collision occurred in both the Newark and Teterboro towers. However, the two controllers did not remember seeing or hearing this alert.

While heading south down river, the airplane was seen to be behind the sightseeing helicopter, which was going about half the speed of the airplane. The pilot of another helicopter (who was refueling at the heliport) saw the impending accident, and attempted to warn both the airborne helicopter and the plane by radio, but received no response. At 11:53:14 am, the Piper's left wing crashed into the Eurocopter, severing the left wing of the airplane and rotor blades from the helicopter. Most witnesses reported the plane entering a nose dive while spiraling into the river, while the helicopter dropped into the water. The collision occurred at approximately 1,100 ft (340 m) MSL altitude and was caught on tape by an Italian tourist. Less than a minute after the collision occurred, the Teterboro controller contacted the Newark tower to inquire about the airplane, and was told that the airplane had not contacted Newark.

Nine people died in the collision. All recovered victims died from blunt trauma to the head, torso and extremities, according to the NYC medical examiner's office.

National Weather Service weather conditions at noon in New York City stations on the day of the collision were described as "sunny" or "partly sunny" with a temperature of between 73 and 75 °F (23 and 24 °C) and variable wind speed of 3–10 mph (5–16 km/h; 3–9 kn).

Authorities said the Piper's "low wing" design made it difficult to see below the aircraft and the helicopter's rotors make it difficult to see above. In addition, neither small aircraft was required to have a flight data recorder or cockpit voice recorder.

== Emergency response ==
=== Rescue ===
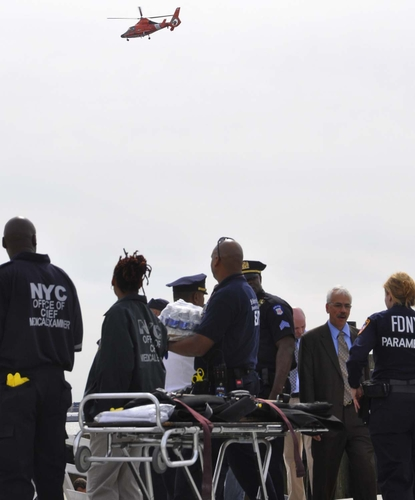
Emergency services stand by after the mid-air collision

Immediately following the accident, the Coast Guard had reported that the New York City Fire Department (FDNY) had rescued one survivor from the Hudson River; however, this report was shown to be incorrect. In addition to FDNY, six rescue boat crews from Coast Guard Station New York, a Coast Guard rescue helicopter crew from Coast Guard Air Station Atlantic City, several Coast Guard Auxiliary assets, the New York City Police Department (NYPD), New Jersey State Police, and local emergency services all participated in the rescue effort. The Red Cross and the New York Harbor Police also assisted in the efforts. At about 3:00 pm, Michael Bloomberg, the mayor of New York, addressed questions in a press conference. Calling the crash "an accident which we do not believe was survivable," Bloomberg announced that the mission was no longer a rescue mission, but rather a recovery mission.

On the night of August 8, 2009, the US Coast Guard maintained a 2-mile (3 km) safety zone from the Holland Tunnel to the Lincoln Tunnel, requiring vessels to move slowly and stay within 400 yards (400 m) of the Manhattan side while passing through the area. The safety zone was maintained by the Coast Guard cutter Penobscot Bay.

=== Recovery ===
On the afternoon of the crash, divers had recovered two bodies from the water. By the next morning, a total of four bodies had been found, while the other five victims were presumed dead. Meanwhile, the helicopter's wreckage was found in about 30 ft (10 m) of water, far from the wreckage fields of the plane. Aided by a sonar, investigators attempted to discover the plane's debris in deeper water near the mid-channel point of the Hudson. Their efforts were hindered, however, by poor visibility underwater and a storm on August 9.

The efforts succeeded on August 10, when the plane's wreckage was discovered in approximately 60 ft (20 m) of water, and was recovered from the river on the afternoon of August 11. Additionally, the last few bodies were found in the wreckage of the plane, ending the search for bodies. The recovery effort was led by the United States Army Corps of Engineers with the aid of NYPD boats, New Jersey State Police divers, and the FDNY.

== Investigation ==
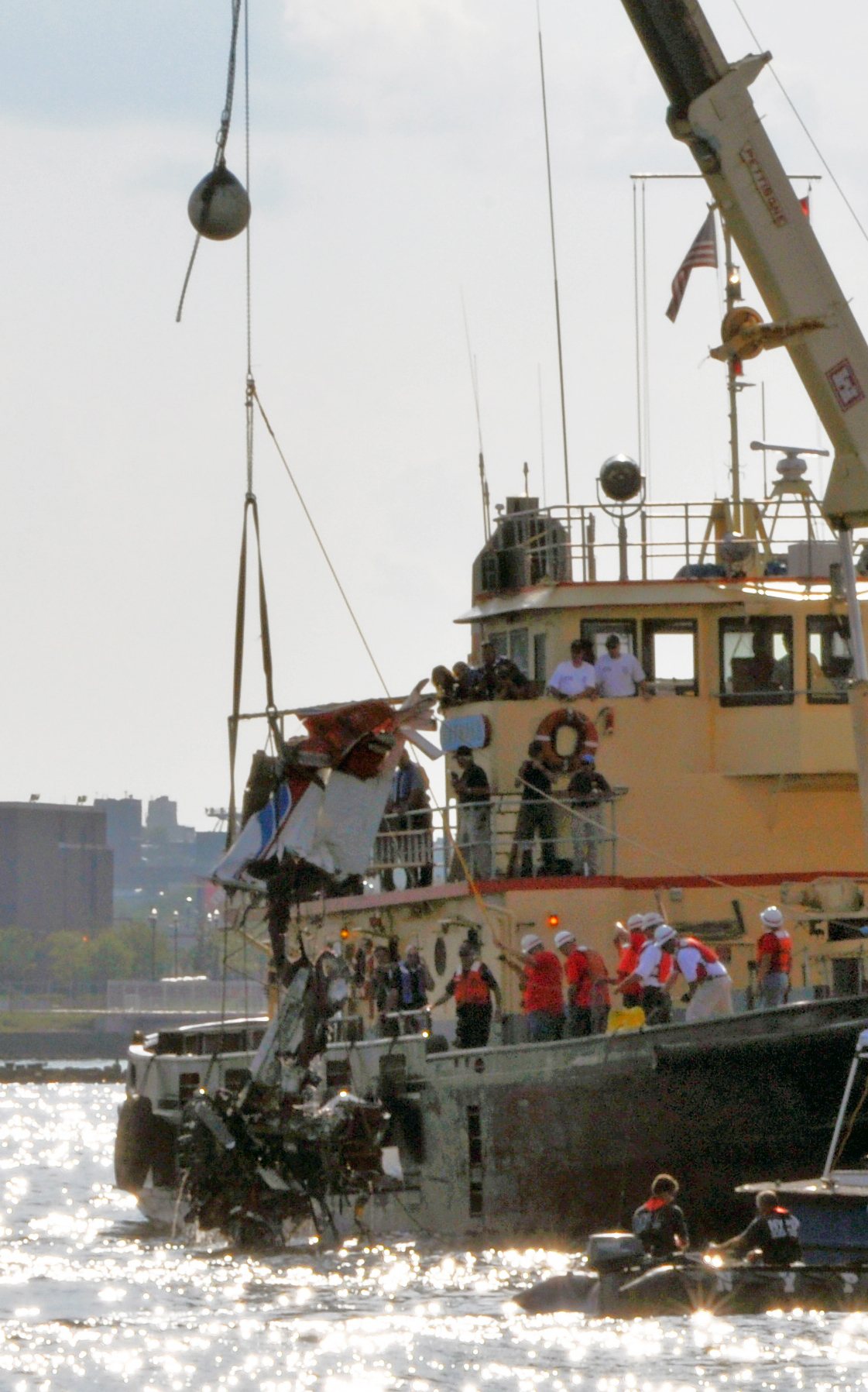
Wreckage of the plane being recovered on August 11

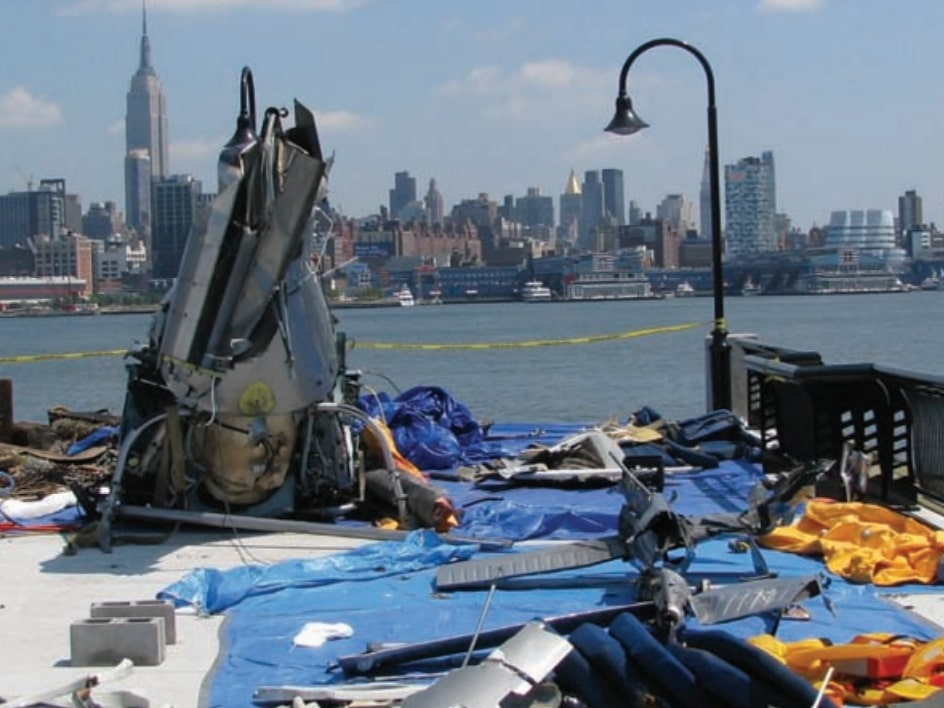
Wreckage of the Eurocopter AS350 with Manhattan and the Empire State Building at the background

On August 14, 2009, the National Transportation Safety Board released a report regarding the incident. The report discussed several aspects of the collision, including locations of origin of the aircraft, planned destination, and air traffic control communications. In addition, the report discussed how one of the controllers at Teterboro Airport was on a phone call and did not warn the airplane pilot of the potential conflict. The National Air Traffic Controller's Union (NATCA) then issued their own press release disputing some of the phrasing in the NTSB's report. The NTSB then retracted some of its statements regarding the controller's part in the crash, saying that the controller could not have warned the plane about the tour helicopter because the tour helicopter was not on the controller's radar. The NTSB also removed NATCA as a party to the investigation as a result of NATCA's press release, as parties to NTSB investigations agree to let the NTSB control publicity during the investigation. NATCA could still submit information to the board regarding the accident, but they would no longer hold a seat on the investigation board.

Due to the accident, the FAA put the Teterboro controller and his supervisor on leave and commented that the phone call was inappropriate but didn't appear to contribute to the accident. However, the NTSB rebuked the FAA for doing so, stating that only the NTSB has the authority to determine the controller's contribution to the incident.

On September 14, 2010, the NTSB released its final report on the incident. The report cited two primary causes of the accident: (1) the "inherent limitations" of the see-and-avoid concept, which meant that from the airplane pilot's point of view, the helicopter would have appeared as a small, stationary object against a backdrop of the New York City skyline until the final seconds before the collision; and (2) the Teterboro controller's personal phone call, which distracted him from his air traffic control duties and prevented him from correcting the airplane pilot's incorrect readback of the Newark control tower's radio frequency.

== Aftermath ==
=== Reaction ===
Reaction from government officials, aviation industry groups, and individuals was widespread. The FAA convened a "New York Airspace Working Group" on August 14, 2009. The group was to solicit comments from helicopter and aircraft operators, and review the operating procedures of the Hudson and East River VFR corridors. They were required to report to FAA administrator Babbitt by August 28. A NOTAM issued on August 11, 2009, advised pilots flying in the area to turn on their lights, use the designated self-announce radio frequencies, and fly at a speed of 140 knots or less.

Fifteen members of Congress, led by Representative Jerrold Nadler (D-New York), sent a letter to FAA administrator J. Randolph Babbitt calling for "immediate action to provide greater oversight of small aircraft operations".

In a press conference on August 8, 2009, New York City Mayor Michael Bloomberg (an airplane and helicopter pilot himself) stated that "Until the National Transportation Safety Board makes a determination, nothing is a fact", and stressed that the investigation could take weeks or months before those facts were known. Representatives from the Aircraft Owners and Pilots Association (AOPA), including AOPA President Craig Fuller, appeared on news programs and collaborated with news sources to explain the workings of the Hudson River VFR corridor and the safety record of flights in that area.

=== NTSB recommendations ===
The NTSB issued a "Safety Recommendation" to the FAA on August 27, 2009. Because of the accident airplane's intended flight path, the NTSB believes that the pilot may have wanted to climb out of the uncontrolled VFR corridor into the controlled Class B airspace above. However, for reasons unknown as yet, he was not in communication with any air traffic controllers after he switched frequencies from Teterboro tower. He also apparently was not communicating on the Corridor's self-announce frequency.

The NTSB recommended that the FAA revise the procedures for ATC facilities in the area to facilitate the process for VFR traffic that wishes to transit Class B airspace. This included establishing procedures to coordinate such requests between facilities; requiring controllers to instruct pilots to self-announce on the VFR corridor frequency if they are unable to immediately enter Class B airspace; adding information to area Automatic Terminal Information Service (ATIS) broadcasts reminding pilots to use the self-announce frequency; and ensuring that pilots are provided with traffic advisories if they are in contact with a controller.

Additionally, the NTSB recommended that ATC controllers and supervisors be briefed in the circumstances of this accident; that a Special Flight Rules Area (SFRA) be established for the location requiring special training for pilots transiting the area; and that helicopters be required to operate at lower altitudes than airplanes in the corridor to minimize the speed differences.

=== FAA changes ===
On September 2, 2009, the FAA announced a plan to improve safety of flights in the corridor. The proposed changes include standardizing the height of the VFR corridor to 1,300 ft (400 m). In addition, many existing procedures that have been treated as "Suggested" items for flying the corridor will now be mandatory, including operating landing lights; maintaining a speed of 140 kn (160 mph) or less while flying in the corridor; monitoring and announcing on the area Common Traffic Advisory Frequency; and travelling along the west shore when southbound and along the east shore when northbound. Pilots will be required to have appropriate charts available, and to familiarize themselves with the applicable rules before flying in the corridor. Additionally, pilot training courses for both transient pilots and charter helicopter pilots will be developed. An implementation timeline was not initially announced.

The FAA instituted new rules for the Hudson River corridor beginning November 19, 2009, establishing three air traffic zones. Under 1,000 ft (300 m), planes and helicopters for sightseeing and lingering would be allowed. From 1,000 to 1,300 ft (300 to 400 m), aircraft would be allowed to fly without air traffic control handling. Above 1,300 ft (400 m), aircraft would be allowed to traverse the corridor under the handling of air traffic control.

== See also ==
- List of civilian mid-air collisions
- 2019 Alaska mid-air collision – another mid-air collision involving commercial VFR sightseeing flights
