= US Navy Small Craft Training Center =

World War II Naval Training Bases

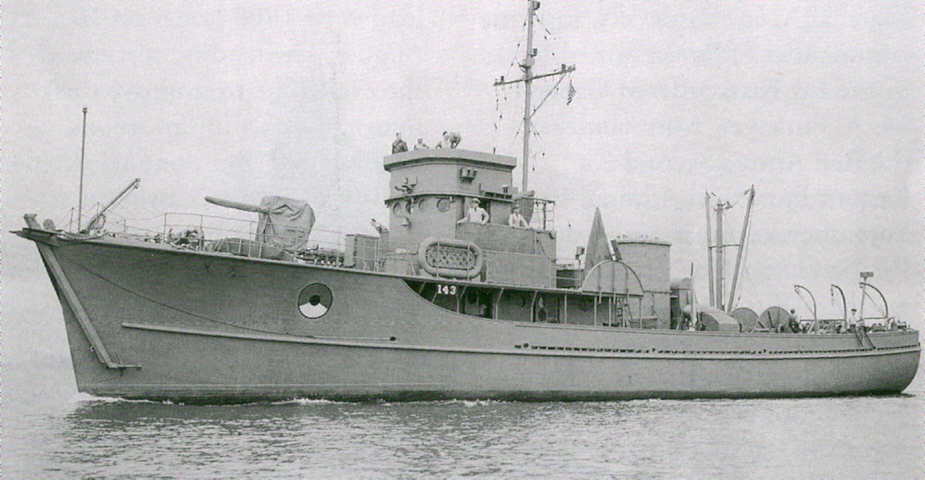
USS YMS-143 Minesweeper

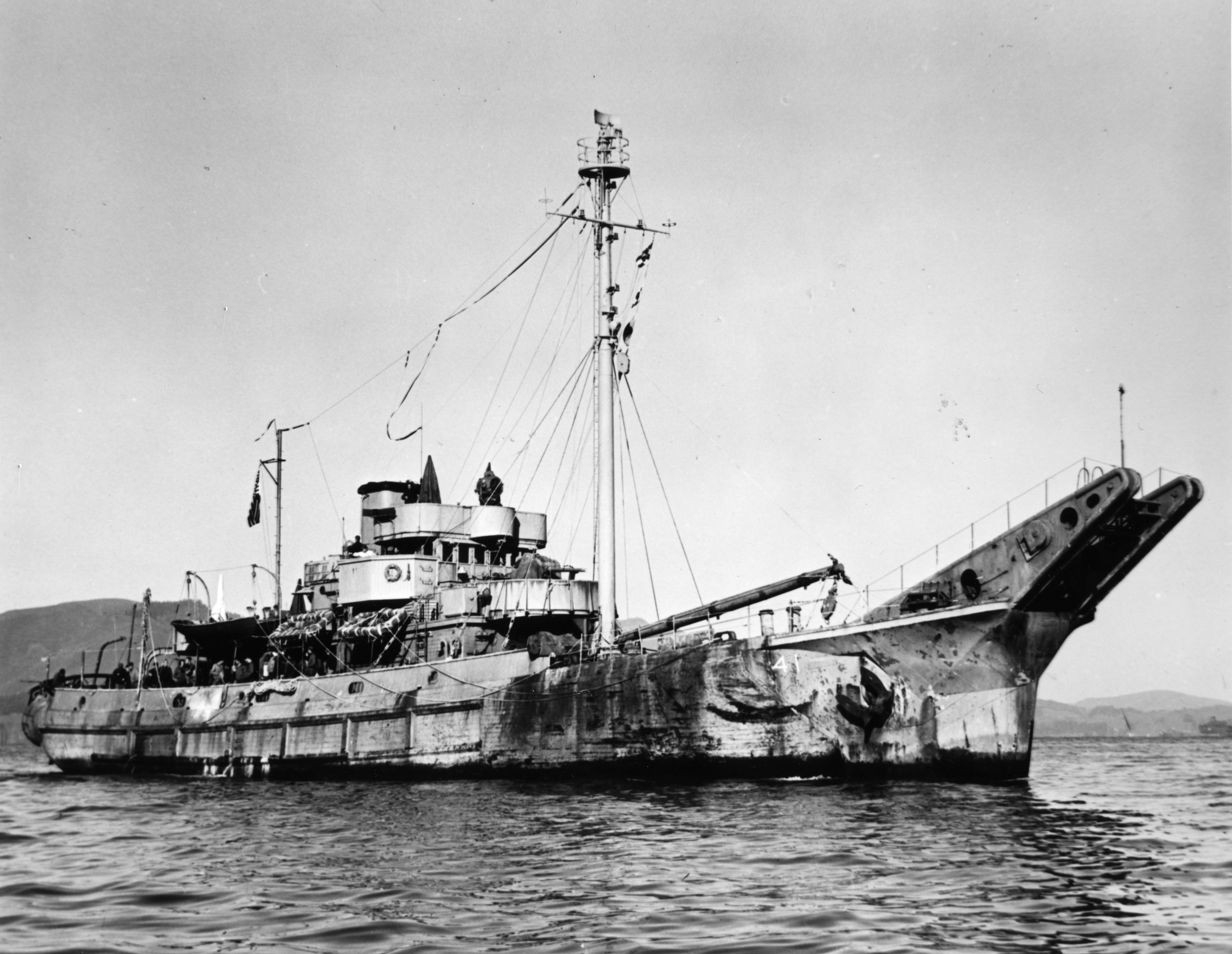
USS Baretta (AN-41) Net layer

US Navy Small Craft Training Centers (SCTC) were United States Navy training bases used to train sailors in the operation of the many small wooden crafts used in World War II. These crafts were given the nickname Splinter Fleet. There was a shortage of steel and steel shipyards during World War II, so there was a need for a vast wooden fleet of crafts. The Small Craft Training Centers had classrooms and crafts for training. The bases had barrack housing and mess halls. To get the men and crafts out into the field quickly, at many of the bases men trained on new ships. The new ships were at the center for about 4 weeks as part of the vessel's sea trial. Tugboats, Minesweepers, Net laying ships, Crash boats, PT boats and other crafts built near the center were taken to the Small Craft Training Centers for testing. Crafts built at Lynch Shipbuilding in San Diego, California were taken to the Small Craft Training Center at Terminal Island, San Pedro, California for their sea trial. Lynch Shipbuilding built tugboats, and minesweepers. Some of the craft at the Terminal Island school were: USS Density (AM-218), USS Waxsaw (AN-91), and USS Climax (AM-161), USS Wateree (ATF-117), USS Quest (AM-281), USS Snowbell (AN-52). The US Navy also had Small Craft Training Centers in Miami, Florida, Santa Barbara, California, New Orleans, Louisiana and other sites.

== US Navy Small Craft Training Centers ==
World War II Small Craft Training Centers:

- Small Craft Training Center at Terminal Island , San Pedro, California
- Small Craft Training Center at Santa Barbara, California with a minesweeping School
- Small Craft Training Center at Opa-locka, Florida near Miami, Florida
- Small Craft Training Center at Key West, Florida
- Small Craft Training Center at New Orleans, Louisiana
- Small Craft Training Center at Norfolk, Virginia

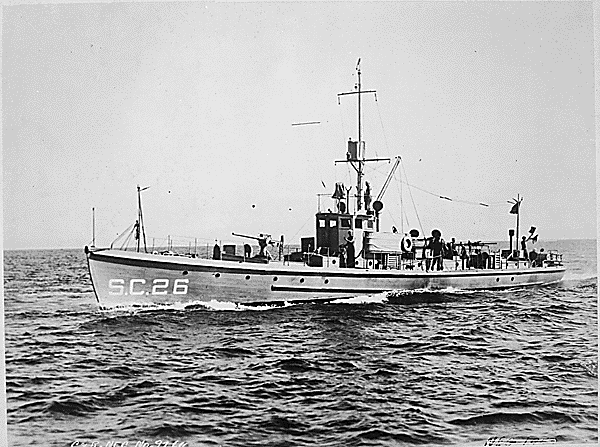
Submarine chaser USS SC-26

== Submarine Chaser Training Center ==
Submarine Chaser Training Center (SCTC) was a US Navy School for training seamen in the use and care for Submarine chasers (PC & SC), used in World War II to hunt Nazi Germany naval submarines, U-boats. Submarine Chaser Training Center was founded in March 1942. The Chaser Training Center was stationed at the old Port of Miami at Pier 2, near downtown on Biscayne Boulevard. Most sub chasers had a crew of 3 officers and 24 enlisted men. Crews had 60 days of training at the center after completing 90 days of basic training. Swim test and Swim training was done at Miami Beach, Florida. Sub chasers were also used in the Pacific War in anti-submarine warfare . Due to the small crafts and large task, some gave the Submarine chasers the nickname Donald Duck Navy. The former Submarine Chaser Training Center is located near the current Museum Park. A few of the craft that were used for training and sea trails at the center were: USS PGM-3, USS PC-1137, USS PC-1264, and USS SC-1470

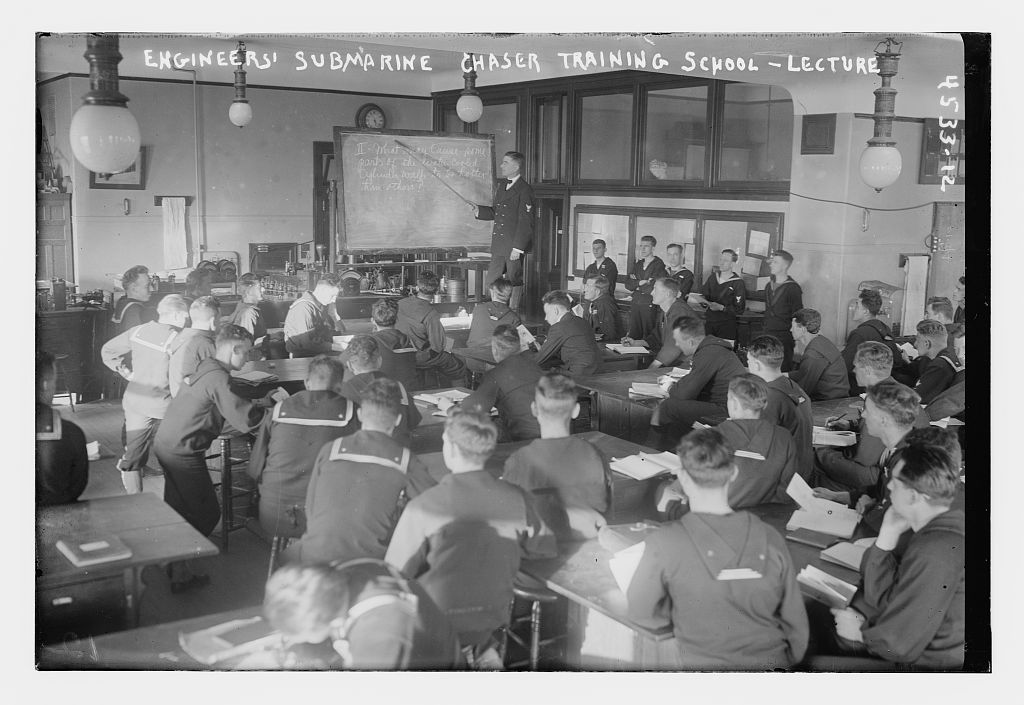
Engineers at the Submarine Chaser Training School

=== Submarine Chaser Training School ===
Submarine Chaser Training School (SCTS) was a US Navy School at Columbia University in City of New York. Training was for work on destroyers to hunt U-boats. The destroyer USS Andres was stationed at the Submarine Chaser Training School.

== Naval Small Craft Instruction and Technical Training School ==
In June 1969 the Navy opened Naval Small Craft Instruction and Technical Training School that currently is headquartered at John C. Stennis Space Center, Mississippi. The School has classes in: Patrol Craft Operations, Patrol Craft Propulsion Systems Overhaul, Patrol Craft Hull Maintenance, Outboard Motor Maintenance and Overhaul, Patrol Craft Weapons Maintenance, Instructor Development Course, and Rule of Law and Disciplined Military Operations.

== See also ==
- Melville Motor Torpedo Boat Squadrons Training Center
- 22nd Crash Rescue Boat Squadron
- Dumbo (air-sea rescue)
- For Those in Peril (1944 film)
- United States Nasty-class patrol boat 1962–1968
- Mark VI patrol boat (2015–2017)
- Motor Launch
