= Capwell =

Capwell is a surname. Notable people with the surname include:

- George Capwell (1902–1970), American manager of the Empresa Eléctrica del Ecuador
- Tobias Capwell (born c. 1973), American curator, military historian and jouster

== Fictional characters ==
- C.C. Capwell, a character on the American soap opera Santa Barbara
- Gina DeMott Capwell a character on the American soap opera Santa Barbara
- Julia Wainwright Capwell, a character on the American soap opera Santa Barbara
- Kelly Capwell, a character on the American soap opera Santa Barbara
- Sophia Wayne Capwell a character on the American soap opera Santa Barbara
- Ted Capwell, a character on the American soap opera Santa Barbara
- Eden Capwell and Cruz Castillo, characters and a supercouple from the American daytime drama Santa Barbara
- Pamela Capwell Conrad, a character on the American soap opera Santa Barbara

== See also ==
- Cork Capwell railway station, on the Cork and Macroom Direct Railway in County Cork, Ireland
- Emporium Capwell, former mid-line department store chain headquartered in San Francisco, California
- Estadio George Capwell, multi-purpose stadium in Guayaquil, Ecuador
- Capel (disambiguation)
- Capell
- Capewell
