= Capel =

Capel may refer to:

== People ==
- Capell, surname, includes a list of people with the surnames Capel and Capell
- Capel (given name), includes a list of people with the given name Capel

== Places ==
=== England ===
- Capel, Kent, a village and civil parish near Tunbridge Wells
- Capel, Surrey, a village and civil parish
- Capel-le-Ferne, Kent
- Capel St Andrew, Suffolk
- Capel St Mary, Suffolk
  - Capel railway station, located at Capel St Mary before it closed
- RNAS Capel, a First World War airship station near Folkestone, Kent

=== Australia ===
- Capel, Western Australia
- Shire of Capel, Western Australia
- Electoral district of Capel, Western Australia, a Legislative Assembly electorate from 2005 to 2008
- Capel River, Western Australia
- Capel River, Western Australia, a locality in the Shire of Capel

== Other uses ==
- HMS Capel, two Royal Navy ships
- Cooperativa Agrícola Pisquera Elqui Limitada, the trademark of a Chilean spirits company, that produces pisco and wine

== See also ==
- Capels, West Virginia, an unincorporated community
- Upper Capel (disambiguation)
