= Cappell =

Cappell is a surname. Notable people with the surname include:

- Daniel Fowler Cappell (1900–1976), Scottish physician and pathologist
- Sylvain Cappell (born 1946), American mathematician

== See also ==
- Capell
- Cappel (disambiguation)
