= SCTC =

SCTC may refer to

- Space Colonization Technical Committee, American Institute of Aeronautics and Astronautics
- Specific Claims Tribunal Canada
- Submarine Chaser Training Center, Miami
- Sunshine Coast Theological College, Queensland, Australia
- Systems & Computer Technology Corp., which was acquired by SunGard
- Maquehue Airport, Temuco, Chile
