= Frank R. Walker =

Frank Robinson Walker
- Born: July 11, 1899; Florence, Alabama
- Died: December 25, 1976 (aged 76)
- Military career
- Allegiance: United States
- Branch: United States Navy
- Service years: 1922–1952
- Rank: Rear Admiral
- Commands: Patterson (DD-392); Destroyer Division 8 Destroyer Squadron 4 La Grange (APA-124); Astoria (CL-90)
- Conflicts: World War II
- Awards: Navy Cross

Frank Robinson Walker (July 11, 1899 – December 25, 1976) was an officer in the United States Navy during World War II, most notably during the Solomon Islands campaign between 1942 and 1943.

Walker became acquainted with Doris Adele Carpenter through her brother-in-law Russell Groesbeck Sturges who was a Naval Academy classmate of his. Doris was the daughter of Cyrus Clay Carpenter II, a prominent California attorney. Doris and Frank were married on December 13, 1925. The couple had one child Franklin Robinson Walker, Jr. who was born in San Diego.

== Biography ==
Born in Florence, Alabama, Walker entered the United States Naval Academy, graduating in 1922. Serving in various positions throughout the 1920s and 1930s, Walker distinguished himself during the attack on Pearl Harbor when, commanding the destroyer Patterson (DD-392), he was one of the few captains to escape the harbor during the raid. In early 1942, Walker was assigned command of Destroyer Division 8 in the Southwest Pacific area, later leading screening and reconnaissance operation shortly before the landings at Guadalcanal and Tulagi on August 7, 1942. Walker would take part in the Battle of Savo Island during the night of August 8–9, where Japanese naval forces sank one Australian and three American cruisers suffering minimal casualties.

While commanding Destroyer Squadron 4 during the Solomon Islands campaign, Walker failed to prevent a Japanese naval force consisting of nine destroyers and twelve various other ships from evacuating the 600-man garrison during the Battle of Vella Lavella on October 6–7, 1943. He was subsequently relieved of his combat command and appointed commander of Roosevelt Base and Small Craft Training Center at San Pedro (now part of Los Angeles, California) the following year.

Walker was given command of the attack transport La Grange (APA-124) and departed San Diego, 1 January 1945. La Grange participated in the largest amphibious assault in the Pacific—the invasion of Okinawa. On 13 August, while still at anchor at Buckner Bay, La Grange came under attack by five Kamikaze planes—one of the last such attacks of the war. Gunners were able to destroy all but one, which struck the superstructure carrying a 500-pound bomb. It exploded in the sick bay, killing all wounded. Casualties were 21 dead and 89 wounded. Six more died later of their wounds.

In 1946, Walker was given command of the light cruiser Astoria (CL-90), until appointed to the Ships' Organization Board, and later the Navy Department's Navy Regulation Board the following year. Walker would eventually leave military service in 1952 and lived in retirement until his death in 1976.
