= Naval Operating Base Terminal Island =

World War II Naval Base in Los Angeles

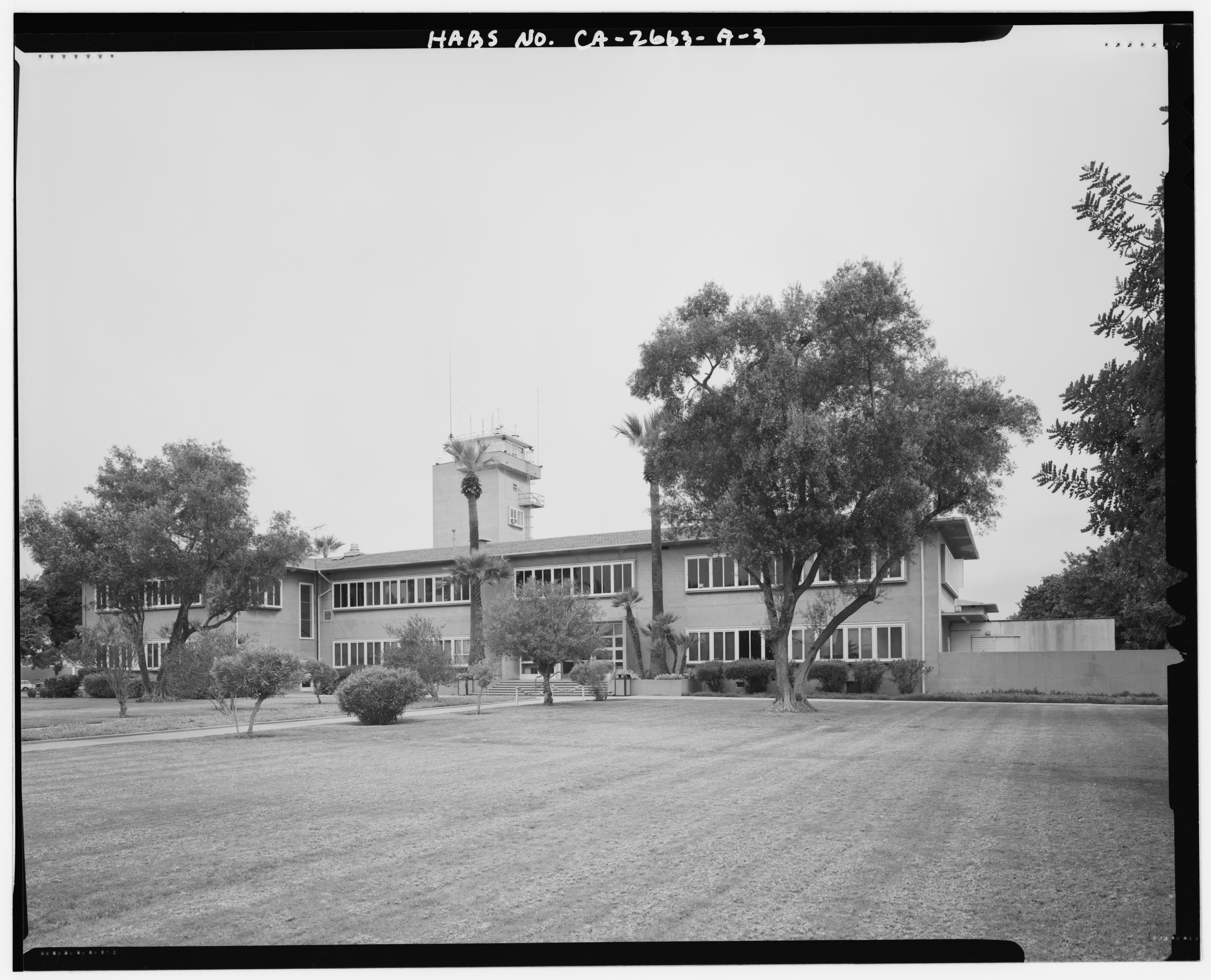
- Roosevelt Base, Administration and Brig Building

- Location within the Los Angeles metropolitan area
- 33°45′25″N 118°14′53″W
- Location: San Pedro, California

History
- Built: Founded 1941

Site notes
- Architect: US Navy

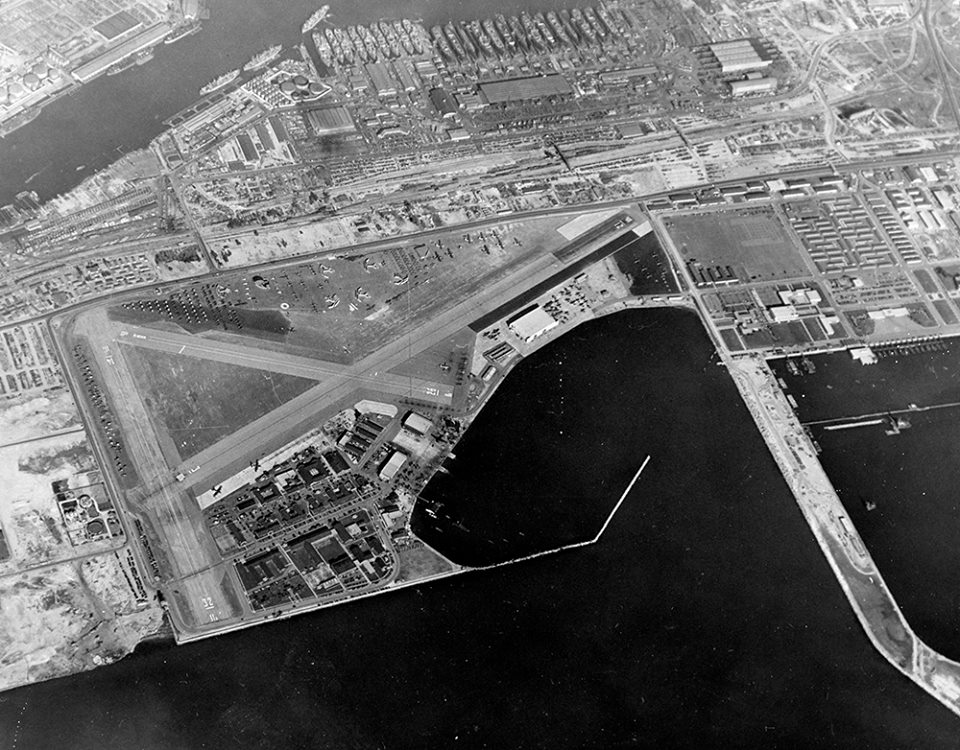
Naval Air Base San Pedro, part of Naval Operating Base Terminal Island on Terminal Island

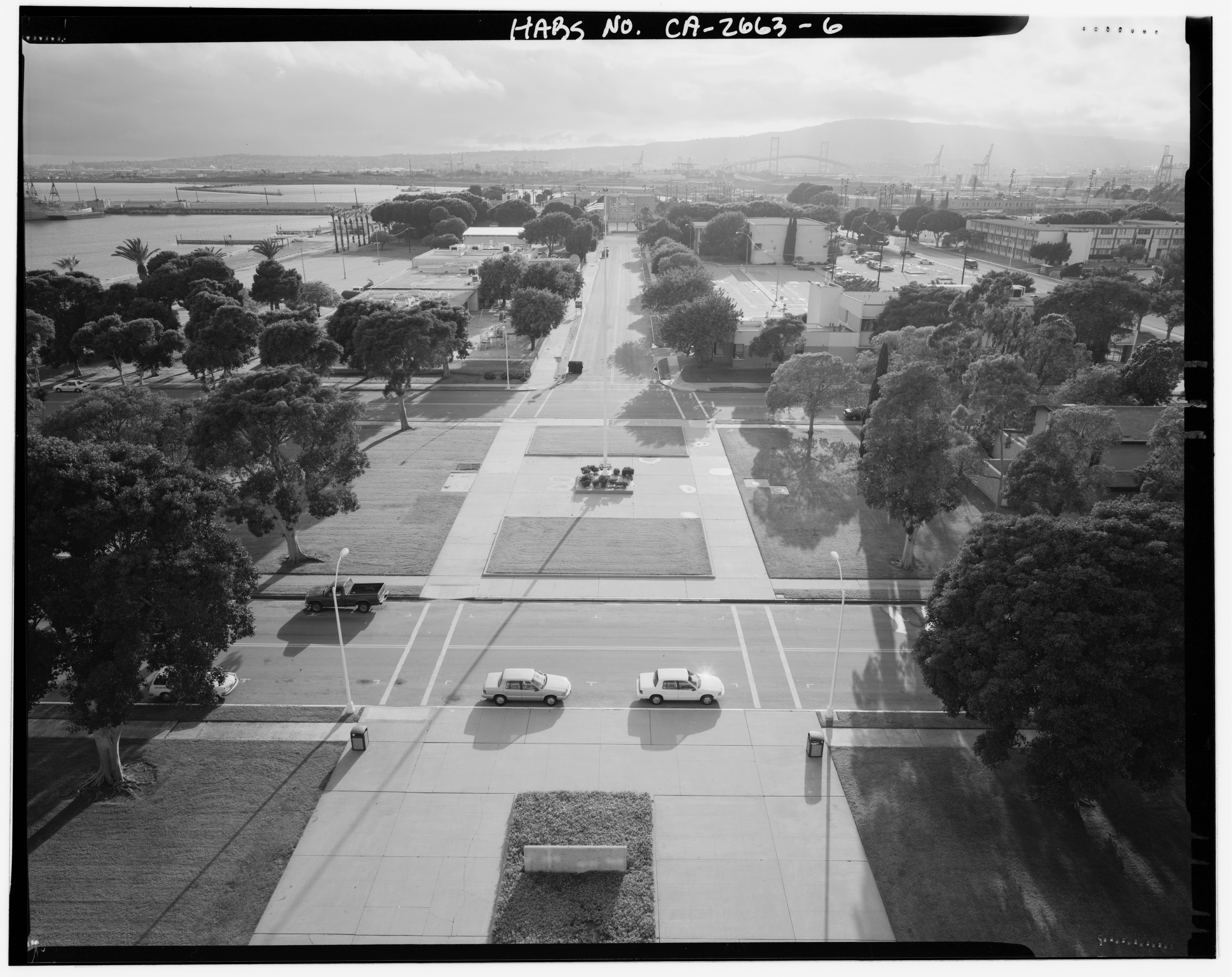
Roosevelt Base

Naval Operating Base Terminal Island, (NOB Terminal Island) was United States Navy base founded on 25 September 1941 to support the World War II efforts in the Pacific War. Naval Operating Base Terminal Island was founded by combining Naval Facilities in cities of San Pedro, Long Beach and Wilmington, California under one command. Much of the base was on the man-made Terminal Island, and harbor in San Pedro Bay. The harbor was made through the construction of a large breakwater system.

== Naval Operating Base Terminal Island Facilities ==
Naval facilities were combined under one Naval command by The US Navy Department General Order No. 154. At the end of the war, the facilities were renamed to be US Naval Bases.

Naval Facilities that made up Naval Operating Base Terminal Island:

- Roosevelt Base Terminal Island
- Naval Air Base San Pedro, Reeves Field, Terminal Island (1927–1947)
- Naval Net Depot, San Pedro
- Naval Hospital Long Beach (1941–1950), now VA Long Beach Healthcare System
- Naval Dispensaries
- Naval Reserve Aviation Base Long Beach, NRAB Long Beach, at Daugherty Field now Long Beach Airport (1928–1947)
- Naval Disbursing and Transportation Officer, San Pedro
- Small Craft Training Center (SCTC) was on Roosevelt Base, but operated independently.

== Roosevelt Base Terminal Island ==
Roosevelt Base Terminal Island shipyard was founded in September 1942 as a ship repair facility. Construction started in 1939. Roosevelt Base also was the administrative and 40 acre recreational center for the Naval facilities on Terminal Island. Roosevelt Base Terminal Island was renamed Naval Station Long Beach on 15 November 1946. The Roosevelt Base had: shipyards, a Marine barracks, fuel tank foram, net depot, ammunition depot, hospital, prison, degaussing range, radio station, mess halls and recreational center, schools, and Navy barracks. The expansion of the harbor breakwater and dredging to make more land was included in the Roosevelt Base plan. The Navy contractors that oversaw the construction were the Guy F. Atkinson Construction Company of San Francisco and the George Pollock Company of Sacramento, with Allied Engineers of as architects and civil engineers. Roosevelt Base Terminal Island was boarded by Ocean Boulevard, Pennsylvania Avenue, Richardson Avenue and Idaho Street, on Naval Station Long Beach. Construction started in 1940 on one large drydock and two small docks. The complete construction of base was completed in 1943. The 11 buildings on the base were built in the Mediterranean Revival architecture. Roosevelt Base Terminal Island shipyard was named the Terminal Island Naval Dry Docks in June 1940. In August 1940 on one. In April 1942 piers were completed. On 9 February 1943 the named of the shipyard change again to US Naval Dry Docks, Roosevelt Base, California. With so much activity in the peak of World War II, in 1944 a pontoon bridge was built to Terminal Island. The pontoon bridge was removed after the completion of the Gerald Desmond Bridge in 1968. With the end of World War II the shipyard was again renamed on 30 November 1945 to Terminal Island Naval Shipyard and in March 1948 renamed to Long Beach Naval Shipyard (NSY) On 15 November 1946, the adjoining Naval Station Long Beach was established.

=== Small Craft Training Center ===
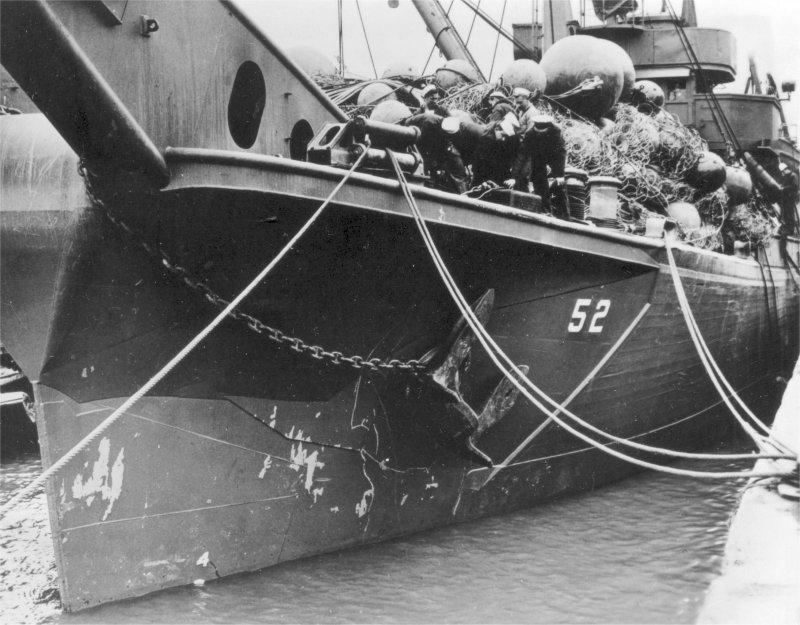
USS Snowbell minesweeper used for training

Small Craft Training Center was located on Roosevelt Base, but operated independently. Many small wooden crafts were used in World War II. These crafts were given the nickname Splinter Fleet. There was a shortage of steel and steel shipyards during World War II, so there was a need for a vast wooden fleet of crafts. The Small Craft Training Center Terminal Island housed 7,500 troops. The Small Craft Training Center had classrooms and crafts for training. To get men and craft out into the field quickly, the crafts the men training on were new ships. The new ships were at the center for about 4 weeks as part of the vessel's sea trial. tugboats, minesweepers, Net laying ships and other crafts built in California were taken to the center for testing. Crafts built at Lynch Shipbuilding in San Diego, California, were taken to the center for their sea trial. Lynch Shipbuilding built tugboats and minesweepers. Some of the craft at the school were: USS Density (AM-218), USS Waxsaw (AN-91), USS Climax (AM-161), USS Wateree (ATF-117), USS Quest (AM-281), and USS Snowbell (AN-52). Other local craft builders were: Harbor Boat Building Company, Fellows & Stewart, Hodgson-Greene-Haldeman Shipbuilders, Peyton Company, Wilmington Boat Works, Al Larson Boat Shop, Garbutt-Walsh Inc., South Coast Shipyard, United Concrete Pipe Corporation, and San Pedro Boatworks The US Navy also had Small Craft Training Centers in Miami, Florida, Santa Barbara, California and other sites.

== Terminal Island Facilities ==
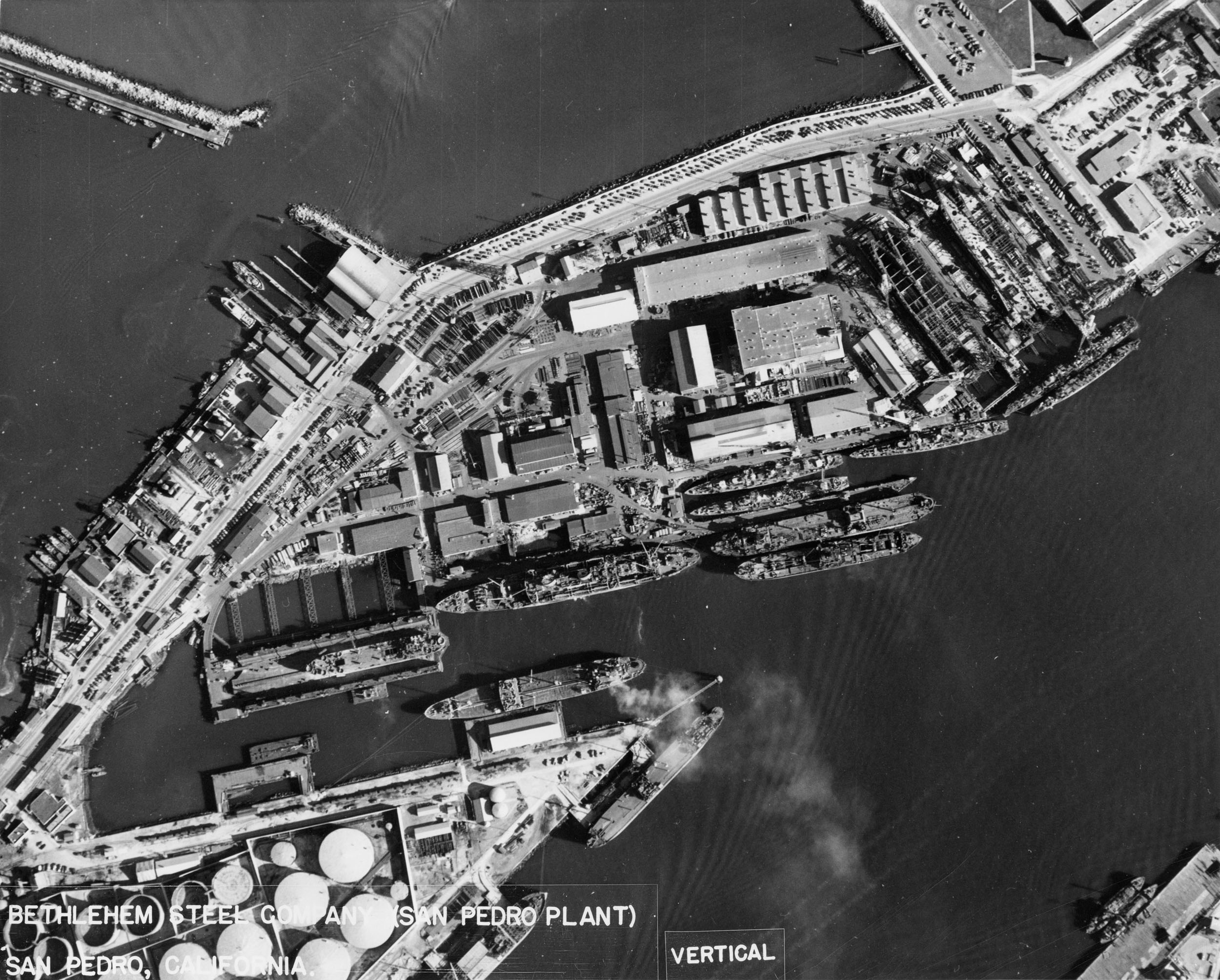
Bethlehem Shipbuilding San Pedro shipyard in 1944, with Naval Operating Base Terminal Island tank farm in lower left

The Navy operated a number of Facilities on Terminal Island:

- Naval Air Base San Pedro
  - Combat Aircrew Refresher Training Unit. (A46474)
  - Navy Ferry Control Liaison Officer.
- Roosevelt Base
  - Naval Drydocks (12236), Moreell Drydock, Drydock No. 1 (April 1942 – 1997) (Called US Naval Dry Docks Roosevelt Base 9 February 1943)
  - Naval Operating Base
  - Harbor Craft Base (2977)
  - Navy Accounting Office
  - Small Craft Training Center (SCTC) (7636) with housing for 7,500 troops.
  - Assistant Supervisor of Shipbuilding, Bethlehem Shipbuilding San Pedro
  - Officer in Charge of Construction of "Civil Works" Contracts, Office of Supervisor of Shipbuilding, Bethlehem Steel Co.
- Naval Disciplinary Barracks (2815)
- Naval Radio Station (40773A)
- Naval Receiving Station
- Naval Dispensary
- Naval Fire Fighters School
- Receiving Station School for Transient Personnel, Receiving Station, Terminal Island.
- Navy Cost Inspector, Bethlehem Steel and Shipbuilding Company

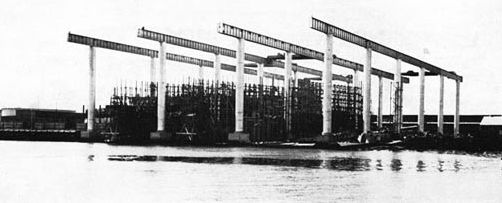
Los Angeles Shipbuilding and Drydock Company Plant, San Pedro, California on March 23, 1942.

- Navy Cost Inspector, Los Angeles Shipbuilding and Drydock Company
- Navy Operating Plant, Los Angeles Shipbuilding & DryDock Co.
- Naval Inspector of Ordnance, Los Angeles Shipbuilding & Drydock Co. (29861)
- Supervisor of Shipbuilding, Los Angeles Shipbuilding & Drydock Co.
- Navy Cost Inspector, Western Pipe and Steel Company
- Naval Training School (Harbor Defense)
- Officer in Charge of Construction of "Civil Works" Contracts
  - Mine Force Pacific Fleet (MINEPAC)
- Officer in Charge of Construction of Contract No. 6096
- Shore Patrol, Military Police

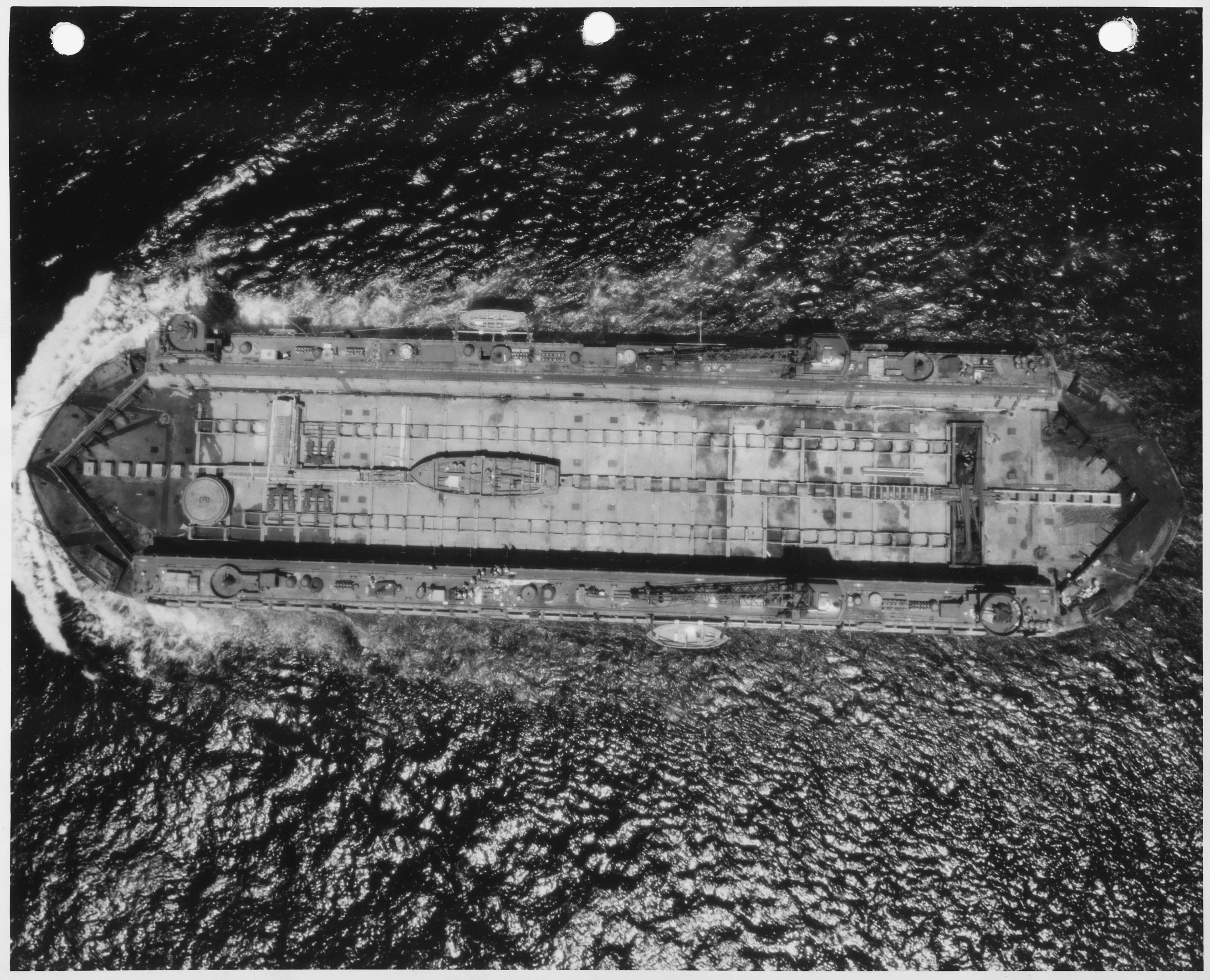
ARDC-8 a Concrete Floating Drydocks being towed at Naval Operating Base Terminal Island

- Naval Inspector Concrete Floating Drydocks (9119), five ARDC Floating Drydocks were built in San Pedro
- Recreational center
  - Gym
  - Auditorium
  - Swimming pools
  - Clubhouse, Allen Center for Captain Ezra G. Allen
  - Tennis courts
  - Lounge
  - Bowling alley
- Field house
- Athletic fields Stark Field for Admiral Harold Rainsford Stark
  - Officers' recreation building
  - Mess halls
  - Classrooms
  - Chapel

== San Pedro Facilities ==
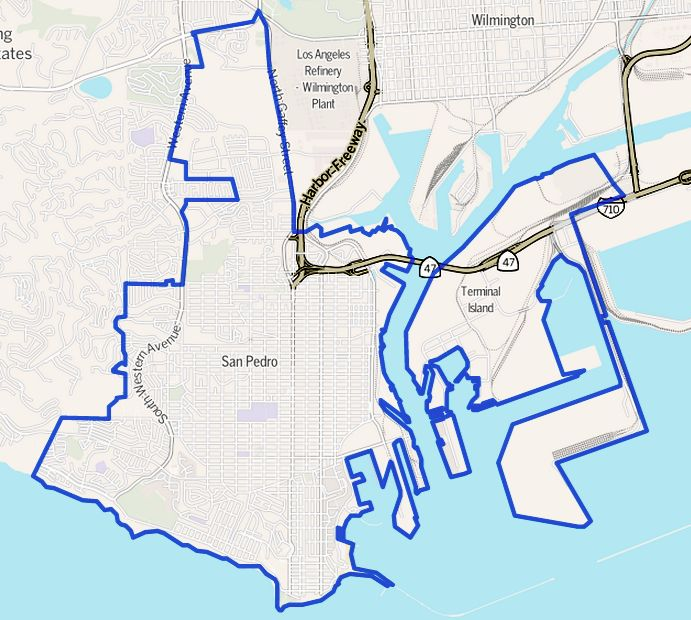
Map of the City of San Pedro, part on the southern part of Palos Verdes Peninsula and part on Terminal Island. The City of Wilmington is to the north of San Pedro with three docks that were part of Naval Operating Base Terminal Island

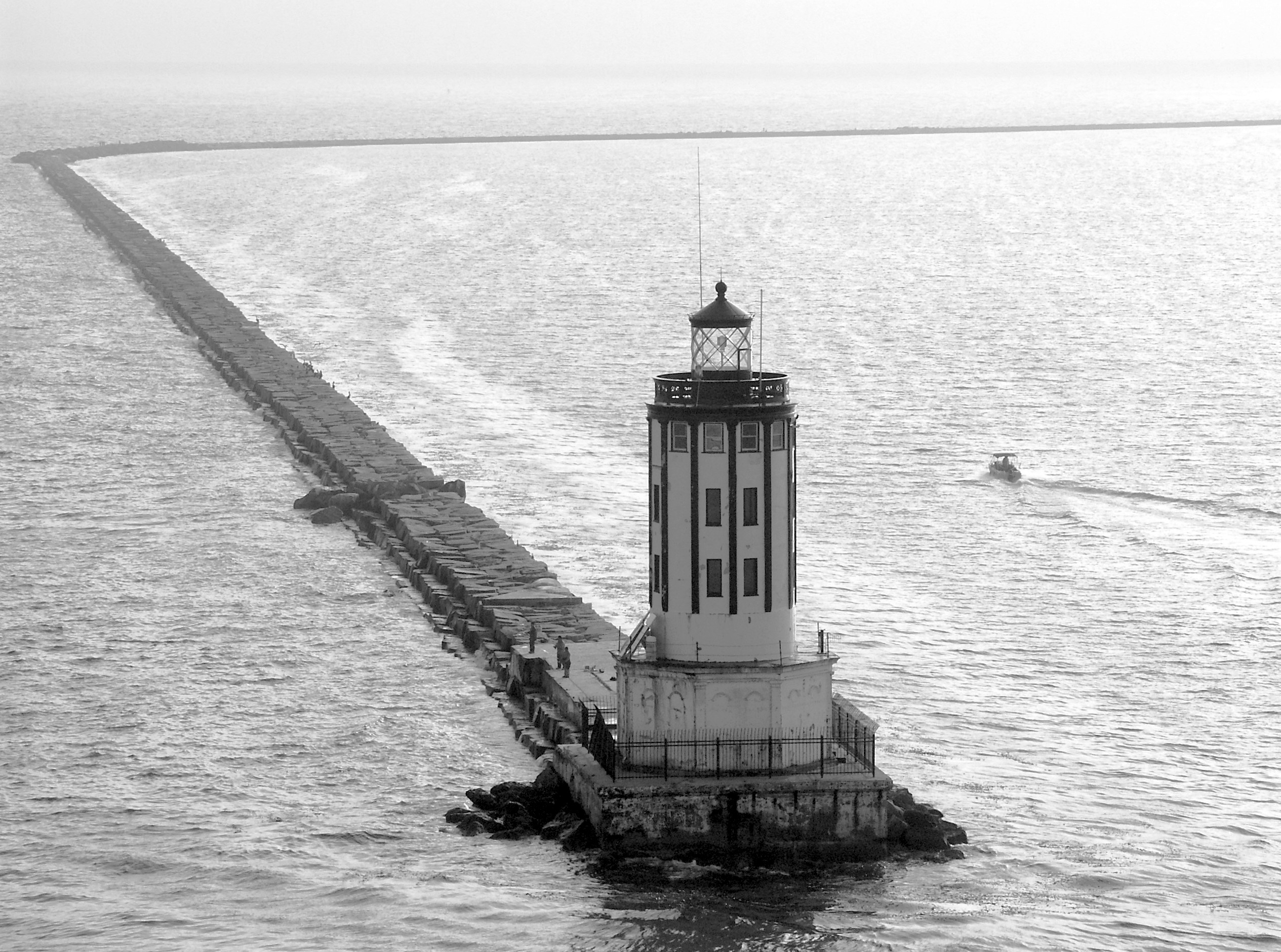
Los Angeles Harbor Light built in 1913, on the 2.11-mile San Pedro breakwater was completed in 1911, part of Naval Operating Base Terminal Island in World War II

Naval Base San Pedro at Pier No. 1:

- A/S Attack Teacher Training Unit, Frontier Base. (46476)
- Area Public Relations Office
- Assistant District Material Officer
- Assistant District Ordnance & Engineering Office. (34163A)
- Assistant Industrial Manager (1470)
- Branch Hydrographic Office
- Branch Intelligence Office
- Branch Public Relations Office (35805A)
- Degaussing Office
- Target Repair Base
- Degaussing Range (36727)
- ECM Repair Facility NOB, electronic countermeasure
- Fire Fighters' School (48471)
- Fleet Post Office (35216a)
- Harbor Entrance Control Post
- Maintenance Branch Office, Training Command, Amphibious Forces, Pacific Fleet (located at San Pedro). (31444A-1)
- Maintenance Office, San Pedro Area (31444A-1)
- Maintenance Office, Training Command, Amphibious Forces, Pacific Fleet (31444A)
- Naval Frontier Base (3332)
- Naval Fuel Depot
- Naval Hydrographic Distributing Office
- Naval Medical Storehouse
- Naval Operating Base
- Naval Dispensary
- Naval Supply Depot
- Central Navy Disbursing Office (11829)
- Naval Fuel Annex
- Port Director, Naval Transportation Service
- Port Director. (35098)
- San Pedro Section, Inshore Patrol
- San Pedro Section (36949)
- Ship's Control Office
- Sub-Issuing Officer
- Navy Routing Office (36885E)
- Assistant Industrial Manager. (14783A)
- Maritime Service Graduate Station
- Office of the Industrial Manager, 11th Naval District. (14783)
- Naval Operating Base
- Marine Barracks
- Naval Disciplinary Barracks (2805)
- Navy Accounting Office
- Registered Publication Sub-Issuing Office. (35665A)
- Wartime Merchant Ship Communications School. (48469)
- Receiving Station

== Long Beach Facilities ==
Long Beach Facilities:

- Resident Inspector of Naval Material.
- Naval Dispensary
- Naval Hospital
- Epidemiological Unit
- Chaplain's Office (7873)
- Senior Patrol Officer
- Navy Relief Office
- Officer in Charge Construction, Naval Ammunition Magazine & Net Depot
- Navy First Aid and Prophylaxis Station, Long Beach

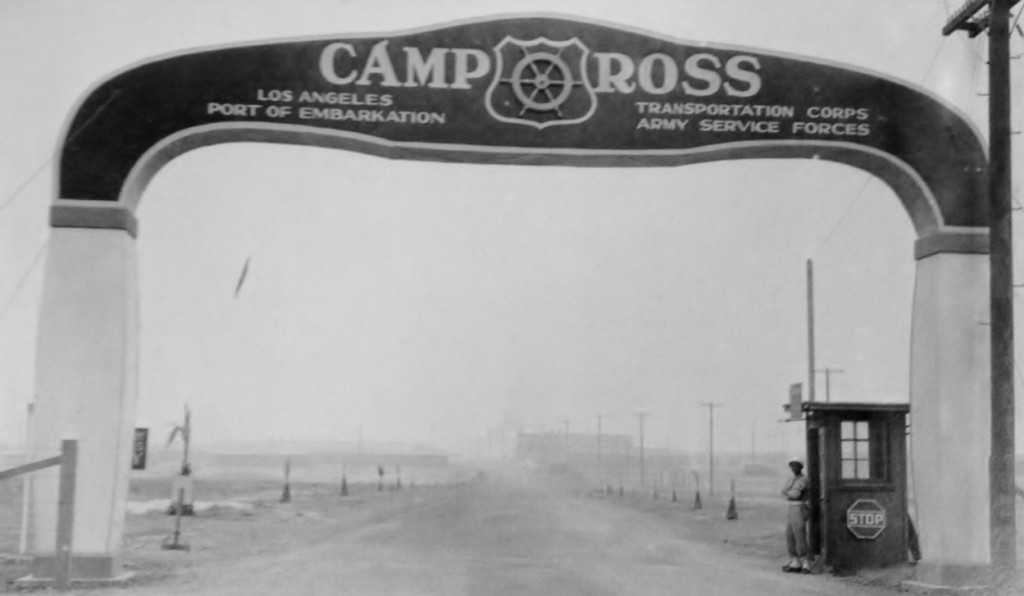
Entrance to Camp Ross in San Pedro, supporting troop deparing at Naval Operating Base Terminal Island

== Camp Ross ==
Camp Ross was a United States Army World War II base and served as a staging area (embarkation camp) under the command of the Army's Los Angeles Port of Embarkation. The camp was located in San Pedro and Wilmington. Troops were housed, processed, and prepared before departing on a ship at Naval Operating Base Terminal Island.

== See also ==
- California during World War II
- Naval Weapons Station Seal Beach (1944–present)
- A. Quincy Jones
- Frank R. Walker
- Mat Roy Thompson
- Military history of the United States during World War II
- United States home front during World War II
