= Naval Air Base San Pedro =

World War II airfield in Los Angeles

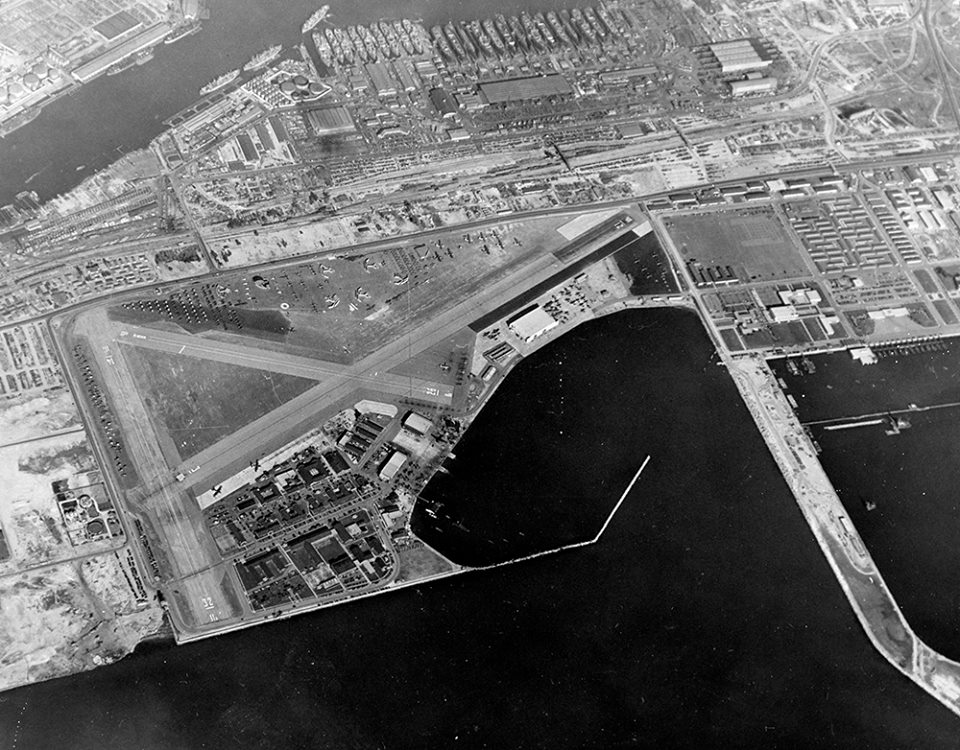
- Naval Air Base San Pedro on Terminal Island

- Location within the Los Angeles metropolitan area
- 33°45′25″N 118°14′53″W
- Location: San Pedro, California

History
- Built: 1927

Site notes
- Area: 410 acres (170 ha)
- Architect: US Navy

Naval Air Base San Pedro, NAS Terminal Island was a US Navy World War II 410-acre airfield on Terminal Island in San Pedro, California part of the City of Los Angeles. Before the Navy took control of the airfield, the airstrip was the civilian Allen Field. Allen Field was built in 1927 by filling with sand the Port of Los Angeles and enlarging Terminal Island. Terminal Island is located between San Pedro Harbor and Long Beach Harbor. Allen Field was serviced by the Pacific Electric and pedestrian ferries. The air terminal has three runways in a triangle shape, two short runways and one 4,200 foot runway. A large seaplane ramp was also built at the terminal. A Naval Air Reserve Training Facility was built next to Allen Field in 1927 and used the runway - ramp. Civilian use ended in 1935 and the site began an air base, later renamed Reeves Field San Pedro, after Rear Admiral Joseph M. Reeves. On 25 September 1941 Naval Air Base San Pedro became part of Naval Operating Base Terminal Island. In 1942 many Reserve troops were trained at the Naval Air Base. In 1943 the Navy took over operations and the Reserve was moved to Naval Air Base Los Alamitos. The base was renamed Naval Air Station Terminal Island and continued as a training base until the end of the war in 1945.

In 1942, NAB San Pedro, now NAS Terminal Island, was designated for equipping and performing flight-tests on the large number of military aircraft fabricated at nearby plants in Southern California: Lockheed, Douglas Aircraft Company and & Vultee Aircraft. To facilitate delivery of these aircraft, the U.S. Navy established the Naval Air Ferry Command (NAFC) (VRF-3) in 1943. During the war the base was commander was Captain Kneflar "Socko" McGinnis. The base was a 24/7 operation, testing and shipping out planes at a rate of approximately 200 a month.

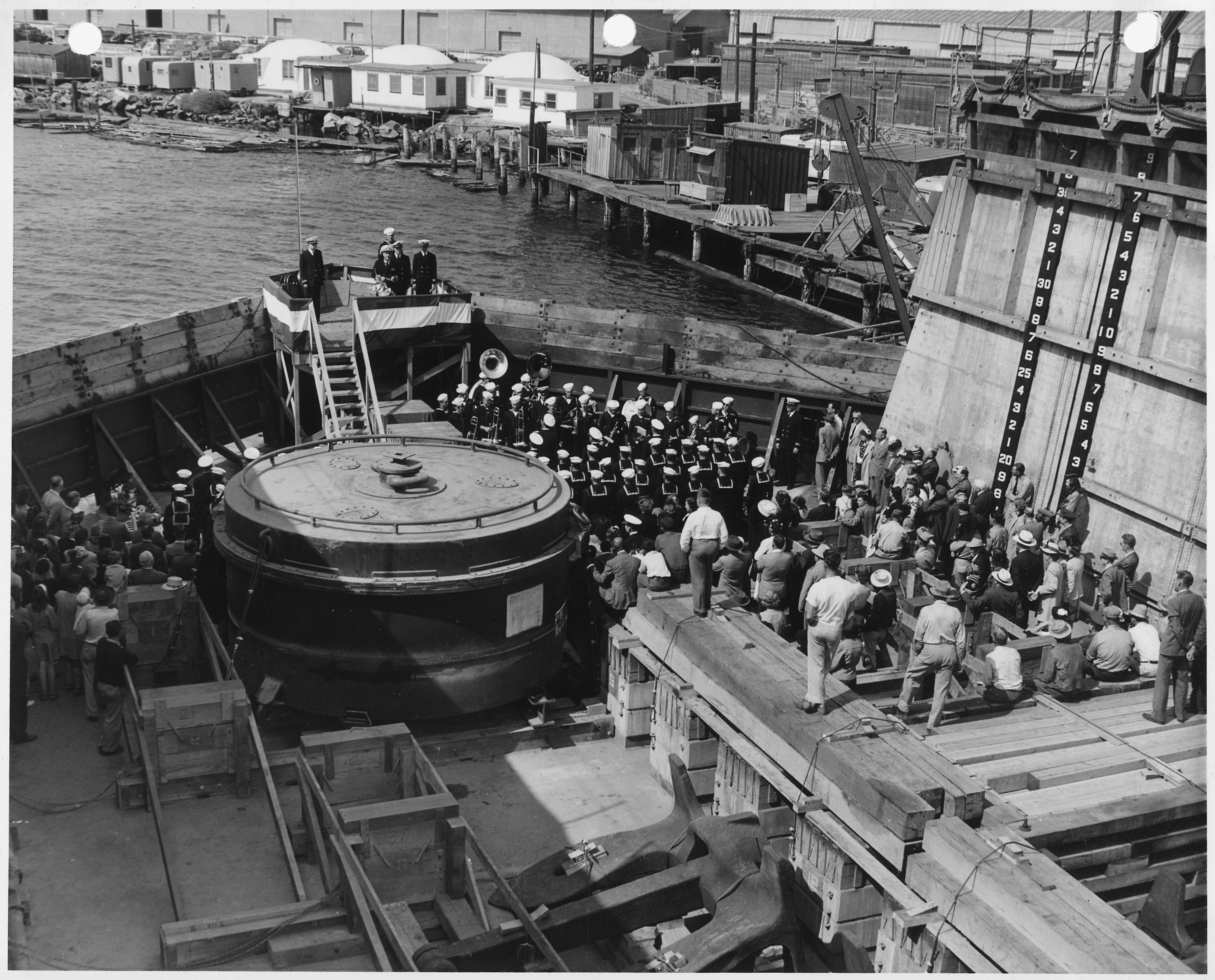
Naval Air Station, San Pedro Shipboard ceremony

Due to a shortage to servicemen during the war, a unit of WAVES (Women Accepted for Volunteer Emergency Service) was stationed at the base. The 200 strong WAVES served as mechanics, air traffic controllers, radio operators, trainers and air navigators.

After the war the base was closed in 1947 and turned over to the Bureau of Yards and Docks. The nearby Naval Air Base Long Beach continued to use the air field until 1997 at which time the base was abandoned; there is no trace of the base today.

== See also ==
- California during World War II
- Naval Weapons Station Seal Beach
- Naval Base San Pedro
- San Pedro Submarine Base
