= Camp Ross =

US WWII army base in California

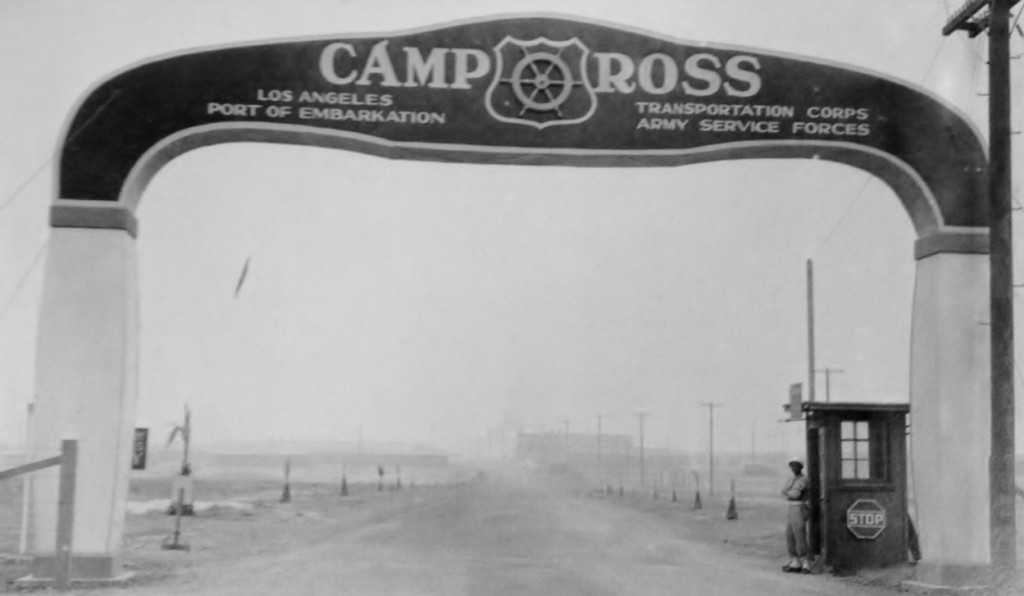
- Entrance to Camp Ross in Wilmington

- Location within California
- 33°49′47″N 118°17′41″W
- Location: San Pedro, California and Wilmington, California

History
- Built: 1942

Site notes
- Area: 31 acres (13 ha)
- Architect: US Army

Camp Ross was a World War II base serving as a staging area (embarkation camp) under the command of the Army's Los Angeles Port of Embarkation. The camp was located in San Pedro, California and Wilmington, California. The United States Department of War leased 31.026 acres of land starting in 1942. Camp Ross was used by the US Army as staging area for troops ready for deployment and for troop returning home to Naval Operating Base Terminal Island.

== Camp ==
The camp could house up to 3,038 soldiers and 253 officers, but at its peak housed 5,000 servicemen and women. With departure and arrived every day, the camp and port moved 10 million tons cargo and over 700,000 troops and more than 28,000 prisoners of war during its years of operation. Many of the departing and returning Troops use the larger Camp Anza in Riverside, California as a staging area. In 1945, at the end of the war the camp was declared surplus and the lease was ended. For the war ships, on January 24, 1942 the Panama Pacific Terminal's Berths 232-A and B were taken over for the war department Los Angeles Port of Embarkation. Camp Ross was also use for staging cargo to shipped overseas, with Norwegian cargo ship MS Torrens being the first ship to depart with cargo on February 12, 1942. Also built at Camp Ross was the Los Angeles Port of Embarkation Station Hospital also called the Torrance Station Hospital. The Army Hospital had 600-bed to service those arriving and departing the port. The hospital opened in November 1943. The camp hosted a Women's Army Corps (WAC) unit that serviced the camp. Also at the camp was a prisoners of war camp for Italian soldiers, the soldiers had surrendered at during the North African campaign. Italian Service Units of the 11th, 26th, 27th, 127th, 128th and 302nd Italian Quartermaster Service Company worked at the camp. By the end of the war over 28,000 prisoners passed through the camp. The camp was named after Sgt. Karl E. Ross was killed in Belgium in World War 1. After the war the Los Angeles Port of Embarkation Station Hospital became the Harbor–UCLA Medical Center and LA BioMed.

- Also near the port was:
  - Long Beach Ammunition Loading Pier
  - Los Angeles Port Of Embarkation Station Hospital (also known as Torrance Station Hospital)
  - Wilmington Classification and Holding Yard
  - Women's Army Corps Housing Area
    - War Animals shipped to and from the port were serviced at the Port Animal Depot, in La Puente, California

== See also ==
- American Theater (1939–1945)
- California during World War II
- Desert Training Center
- Military history of the United States during World War II
- United States home front during World War II
