= HMS Capel =

Two ships of the Royal Navy have been named HMS Capel:

- HMS Capel (BDE-45) was launched in 1942 and allocated to the Royal Navy under Lend-Lease, then reallocated to the US Navy in 1943 and renamed USS Andres (DE-45) as an Evarts-class destroyer escort
- HMS Capel (K470) was laid down as the Evarts-class destroyer escort USS Wintle (DE-266), then transferred to the Royal Navy as the Captain-class frigate HMS Capel under Lend-Lease in 1943.
