= USS PC-1137 =

History

United States
- Name: USS PC-1137
- Builder: Defoe Shipbuilding Company, Bay City, Michigan
- Laid down: 29 December 1942
- Launched: 29 March 1943
- Commissioned: 23 October 1943
- Renamed: USS PCC-1137, 20 August 1945
- Decommissioned: 10 August 1946
- Renamed: USS Worthington (PCC-1137), 15 February 1956
- Namesake: cities in Indiana, Minnesota, and Ohio
- Stricken: 29 May 1959
- Honors and awards: 1 battle star, World War II
- Fate: Sold for scrapping

General characteristics
- Class & type: PC-461-class submarine chaser
- Displacement: 280 Tons
- Length: 173 ft 8 in (52.93 m)
- Beam: 23 ft (7.0 m)
- Draft: 10 ft 10 in (3.30 m)
- Propulsion: 2 Diesel Electric
- Speed: 20.2k during trials
- Complement: 65
- Armament: 1 × 3 in (76 mm)/50 cal; 1 × 40 mm gun; 5 × 20 mm cannons; 2 × depth charge throwers

USS PC-1137 was a PC-461-class submarine chaser built for the United States Navy during World War II. After World War II, the ship was renamed USS PCC-1137, reflecting her new role as a combat communications control ship. Later, in 1956, she was renamed Worthington (PC-1137) although she never saw active service under this name.

== Career ==
PC-1137 was laid down on 29 December 1942 at the Defoe Shipbuilding Company in Bay City, Michigan. She was launched on 29 March 1943 and then towed down the Mississippi River to New Orleans for outfitting and acceptance trials. She was officially commissioned on 23 October 1943.

PC-1137 headed for the southwestern Pacific late in November, after shakedown training at the Submarine Chaser Training Center based at Pier 2 at PortMiami, Florida. She transited the Panama Canal on 5 and 6 December, and arrived at Guadalcanal in the Solomon Islands on 18 February 1944. Assigned to Task Group (TG) 35.6, the ship spent the next five months escorting convoys among various American bases in the southwestern Pacific and conducting anti-submarine patrols from bases throughout the Solomons chain. On 26 July, she concluded that duty and began training to prepare for the invasion of the Western Carolines. Those preparations lasted until 4 September, at which time she departed Guadalcanal in the screen for LST Flotilla 13, bound for the Palaus.

During the initial assault on Peleliu between 14 and 16 September, she served as forward control and reference ship for the landings on Orange Beach 3. On the 16th, she completed that assignment and began screening the operational area against Japanese submarine attack. She remained occupied in this task until 15 November when she received orders assigning her to TG 96.3 at Eniwetok Atoll and signaling a return to convoy escort duty. Between 23 November 1944 and 3 March 1945, PC-1137 travelled the circuit between Eniwetok, Ulithi, Guam, and Saipan, screening supply and reinforcement convoys.

On 4 March, PC-1137 set a course for Pearl Harbor. She arrived at Oahu on 13 March and began a seven-week repair period during which she was converted to a combat communications control ship. She completed repairs and conversion near the end of the first week in May and then spent the following week in amphibious training exercises at Maui. On 21 May, PC-1137 put to sea with LST Flotilla 35 en route to the Mariana Islands. She arrived at Saipan on 10 June and reported for duty as a convoy escort. For the remainder of the war, she made the convoy run between the Marianas and Okinawa in support of the final campaign of World War II and conducted anti-submarine patrols out of Apra Harbor, Guam. On 20 August, five days after the cessation of hostilities, she was officially reclassified a combat communications control ship, PCC-1137. After a repair period in late August and early September, the ship departed Guam on 20 September, bound for Japan and duty in the occupation forces there.

She arrived in Tokyo Bay on 25 September and joined TG 53.4. The submarine chaser operated in Japanese waters with the occupation forces until the beginning of 1946. After several months of service in the Central Pacific, notably at Truk, Eniwetok, and Guam, she departed Eniwetok to return to the United States.

The ship made a six-day stopover at Pearl Harbor and then continued on to the west coast, arriving in Astoria, Oregon, on 27 May. She began the inactivation process immediately and was decommissioned on 10 August. Berthed with the Columbia River Group, Pacific Reserve Fleet, PCC-1137 lay idle during the remaining 12 years and six months of her Navy career. On 15 February 1956, she received the name Worthington, one she wore for only three years. On 29 May 1959, her name was struck from the Navy list; and later, she was sold for scrapping.

Worthington earned one battle star during World War II as PC-1137. Hollywood actor Kirk Douglas served as a gunnery and communications officer on the ship.

Douglas said in his autobiographies that he had served in USS PC-1139.
