= Hodgson-Greene-Haldeman Shipbuilders =

Shipbuilding company in Long Beach, California, USA

Hodgson-Greene-Haldeman Shipbuilders was a wood shipbuilding company in Long Beach, California. To support the World War II demand for ships, Hodgson-Greene-Haldeman made US Army passenger boats, Type B ship barges and Type V ship wood tugboatss. Before the war, Hodgson-Greene-HaldemanHodgson-Greene-Haldeman built fishing boats. At the end of the war the shipyard purchased by Long Beach Marine Repair Company, which was next to the shipyard. Long Beach Marine Repair Company closed in 1970. The Hodgson-Greene-Haldeman shipyard was located at 1409 West 7th Street, Long Beach, California. Hodgson-Greene-Haldeman was a partnership of: Frank W. Hodgson, Greene and Haldeman.

Ship name or #	Build for	Type	Delivered	length in Feet	Notes	Tons	Ship ID O.N.
Juggling Tug	US Army	Tug	Aug-42	40	To USA as ST 65, Beam 11', Draft 6' diesel engine 110 hp		
J 399	US Army	Passenger Boat	2/43	50	Diesel, design 212		
J 400	US Army	Passenger Boat	2/43	50	Sold as Libra		276963
J 401	US Army	Passenger Boat	2/43	50			
J 402	US Army	Passenger Boat	2/43	50			
J 403	US Army	Passenger Boat	2/43	50	Sold as Rolfh I		285613
J 404	US Army	Passenger Boat	2/43	50			
J 405	US Army	Passenger Boat	2/43	50			
J 406	US Army	Passenger Boat	2/43	50			
J 407	US Army	Passenger Boat	2/43	50			
J 408	US Army	Passenger Boat	2/43	50	Sold as Allone		256292
J 538	US Army	Passenger Boat	2/43	50			
J 539	US Army	Passenger Boat	2/43	50			
J 540	US Army	Passenger Boat	2/43	50			
J 541	US Army	Passenger Boat	2/43	50	Sold as Korker		256316
J 542	US Army	Passenger Boat	2/43	50			
J 543	US Army	Passenger Boat	2/43	50			
J 544	US Army	Passenger Boat	2/43	50			
J 545	US Army	Passenger Boat	2/43	50			
J 546	US Army	Passenger Boat	2/43	50			
J 547	US Army	Passenger Boat	2/43	50	Sold as Lumina		254345
J 548	US Army	Passenger Boat	2/43	50			
J 549	US Army	Passenger Boat	2/43	50			
J 550	US Army	Passenger Boat	2/43	50			
J 551	US Army	Passenger Boat	2/43	50			
J 552	US Army	Passenger Boat	2/43	50			
J 553	US Army	Passenger Boat	2/43	50			
J 554	US Army	Passenger Boat	2/43	50			
J 555	US Army	Passenger Boat	2/43	50			
J 556	US Army	Passenger Boat	2/43	50			
J 557	US Army	Passenger Boat	2/43	50			
1069	US Mar. Comm.	Coal Barge (B3F1)	Jul-43	194			Hull # 11
1070	US Mar. Comm.	Coal Barge (B3F1)	Jul-43	194			Hull # 12
1071	US Mar. Comm.	Coal Barge (B3F1)	Aug-43	194			Hull # 13
1072	US Mar. Comm.	Coal Barge (B3F1)	Aug-43	194			Hull # 14
1073	US Mar. Comm.	Coal Barge (B3F1)	Aug-43	194			Hull # 14
BCL 1651	US Army	Dry Cargo Barge	1/44	204			
BCL 1652	US Army	Dry Cargo Barge	1/44	204			
BCL 1653	US Army	Dry Cargo Barge	1/44	204			
BCL 1654	US Army	Dry Cargo Barge	1/44	204			
BCL 1655	US Army	Dry Cargo Barge	1/44	204			
FP 392	US Army	Freighter	1944				
LT 151	US Army	Large Tug	4/44	127	Sold in 1948 as Osage, later called Charles, abandoned in Vietnam 1973, Beam 28', Draft 16', two diesel engines, 1,350 hp	270	250571
LT 152	US Army	Large Tug	4/44	127	To Italy in 1946 as Atleta, stricken 1973, scrapped 1977; Beam 28', Draft 16', two diesel engines, 1,350 hp	270	
LT 153	US Army	Large Tug	4/44	127	To Dutch owners in 1946, engines removed, hull later abandoned, Beam 28', Draft 16', two diesel engines, 1,350 hp	270	
LT 154	US Army	Large Tug	4/44	127	To Italy in 1946 as Tenace, stricken 1973, scrapped 1977, Beam 28', Draft 16', two diesel engines, 1,350 hp	270	
LT 155	US Army	Large Tug	4/44	127	Sold in 1947 as Oceaan, then called Zuidzee, then Proteus, converted to freighter in 1966,, Beam 28', Draft 16', two diesel engines, 1,350 hp	270	
MTL 1162	US Army	Tug	10/43-11/43	47			
MTL 1163	US Army	Tug	10/43-11/43	47			
MTL 1164	US Army	Tug	10/43-11/43	47			
MTL 1165	US Army	Tug	10/43-11/43	47			
MTL 1166	US Army	Tug	10/43-11/43	47	Later YT 640, Sold in 1948		
MTL 1167	US Army	Tug	10/43-11/43	47	Later YT 641, Sold in 1948		
MTL 1168	US Army	Tug	10/43-11/43	47	Later YT 642, reclassified "small boat" 1948		
MTL 1169	US Army	Tug	10/43-11/43	47	Later YT 643, reclassified "small boat" 1948		
MTL 1170	US Army	Tug	10/43-11/43	47	Later YT 644, Sold in 1948		
MTL 1171	US Army	Tug	10/43-11/43	47	Later YT 645, Sold in 1948		
MTL 1172	US Army	Tug	10/43-11/43	47	Later YT 646, Sold in 1947		
MTL 1173	US Army	Tug	10/43-11/43	47	Later YT 647, Sold in 1947		
MTL 1174	US Army	Tug	10/43-11/43	47	Later YT 648, to Dept.of Interior 1946		
MTL 1175	US Army	Tug	10/43-11/43	47	Later YT 649, Sold in 1947		
MTL 1176	US Army	Tug	10/43-11/43	47	Sold as Joan B		
MTL 1177	US Army	Tug	10/43-11/43	47			
MTL 1178	US Army	Tug	10/43-11/43	47			
MTL 1179	US Army	Tug	10/43-11/43	47			
MTL 1180	US Army	Tug	10/43-11/43	47			
MTL 1181	US Army	Tug	10/43-11/43	47			
MTL 1182	US Army	Tug	10/43-11/43	47			
MTL 1183	US Army	Tug	10/43-11/43	47			
MTL 1184	US Army	Tug	10/43-11/43	47			
MTL 1185	US Army	Tug	10/43-11/43	47			
MTL 1186	US Army	Tug	10/43-11/43	47			
MTL 1187	US Army	Tug	10/43-11/43	47	Later YT 690, Sold in 1947		
MTL 1188	US Army	Tug	10/43-11/43	47	Later YT 691, Sold in 1947		
MTL 1189	US Army	Tug	10/43-11/43	47	Later YT 692, Sold in 1947		
MTL 1190	US Army	Tug	10/43-11/43	47	Later YT 693, lost 1947		
MTL 1191	US Army	Tug	10/43-11/43	47	To be YT 694, but cancelled 1945		
MTL 1192	US Army	Tug	Dec-43	46	Later YT 695, reclassified "small boat" in 1948		
MTL 1193	US Army	Tug	Dec-43	46	Later YT 696, reclassified "small boat" in 1948		
Marine Tow Launch MTL 1194	US Army	Tug	Dec-43	46	Later YT 697, Sold in 1947		
MTL 1195	US Army	Tug	Dec-43	46	To be YT 698, but cancelled in 1945		
MTL 1196	US Army	Tug	Dec-43	46			
MTL 1197	US Army	Tug	Dec-43	46	Later YT 699, Sold in 1947		
MTL 1198	US Army	Tug	Dec-43	46			
MTL 1199	US Army	Tug	Dec-43	46			
MTL 1200	US Army	Tug	Dec-43	46			
MTL 1201	US Army	Tug	Dec-43	46			
MTL 1238	US Army	Tug	3/44	46			
MTL 1239	US Army	Tug	3/44	46			
MTL 1240	US Army	Tug	3/44	46			
MTL 1241	US Army	Tug	3/44	46			
MTL 1242	US Army	Tug	3/44	46			
MTL 1243	US Army	Tug	3/44	46			
MTL 1244	US Army	Tug	3/44	46			
MTL 1245	US Army	Tug	3/44	46			
MTL 1246	US Army	Tug	3/44	46			
MTL 1247	US Army	Tug	3/44	46			
MTL 1248	US Army	Tug	3/44	46			
MTL 1249	US Army	Tug	3/44	46			
MTL 1250	US Army	Tug	3/44	46			
MTL 1251	US Army	Tug	3/44	46			
MTL 1252	US Army	Tug	3/44	46			
MTL 1253	US Army	Tug	3/44	46			
MTL 1254	US Army	Tug	3/44	46			
MTL 1255	US Army	Tug	3/44	46			
MTL 1256	US Army	Tug	3/44	46			
LT 389	US Army	Large Tug	4/44-10/44	127	Mined and sank in the English Channel in 1944	290	
LT 390	US Army	Large Tug	4/44-10/44	127	Sold in 1948 as Ikaika in Hawaii, later called Mikiala, intentionally scuttled off Honolulu in 1971, beam 28', Depth: 12.8'	290	252239
LT 391	US Army	Large Tug	4/44-10/44	127	Sold in 1946 as Sea Lark	290	250462
LT 392	US Army	Large Tug	4/44-10/44	127	To Japan in 1950s as Toba, returned in 1965	290	
LT 393	US Army	Large Tug	4/44-10/44	127	Sold in 1954 as Comet, burnt in Prince Rupert BC, abandoned in Puget Sound in 1966	290	250379
LT 394	US Army	Large Tug	4/44-10/44	127	Sold in 1947 as Mary Foss, later Griffin, Hydro, Mikki, sank in the Caribbean in 1993	290	275006 (Hull#36)
YP 621	US Navy	Patrol Craft	1945	128	Sold in 1947 as MV High Seas owned by M. O. Medina, on the March 10, 1970 sank due to leak 2.25 miles off Point Loma, San Diego, California.		255253
YP 622	US Navy	Patrol Craft	1945	128	Sold in 1947 as White Sea		252860
Viking		Fishing Vessel	1945				
Liberty Bell		Fishing Vessel	1944	95	Lost 1978	199	
Miss America		Fishing Vessel	1946	95		199	
Sun Queen		Fishing Vessel	1946	110	Later Jo Maria then New Era	283	
		Fishing Vessel	1946	32			
		Fishing Vessel	1946	32			
Renown		Fishing Vessel	1947	110		302	
Sacramento		Fishing Vessel	1945				

== See also ==
- California during World War II
- Maritime history of California
- United Concrete Pipe Corporation
