= Capell =

Capell or Capel is a surname. Notable people with the name include:

== Capell ==
- Arthur Capell, 1st Baron Capell of Hadham (1608–1649), English politician
- Arthur Capell, 1st Earl of Essex (1631–1683), English statesman
- Arthur Capell (1902–1986), Australian linguist
- Edward Capell (1713–1781), English critic (not to be confused with Edward Capel - see below)
- Ernest J. Capell, English amateur cyclist who in 1934 won the British Best All-Rounder competition
- Henry Capell, 1st Baron Capell (1638–1696), First Lord of the English Admiralty
- Peter Capell (1912–1986), German actor
- Robert Capell, 10th Earl of Essex (1920–2005)
- William Jennings Capell (born 1953), American retired grocery clerk, heir presumptive to the Earldom of Essex

== Capel ==
- Arthur Boy Capel (died 1919), English polo player and lover and muse of fashion designer Coco Chanel
- Conner Capel (born 1997), American baseball player
- David Capel (1963–2020), English former cricketer
- Diego Capel (born 1988), Spanish footballer
- Edward Capel (1770–1855), English general and cricketer (not to be confused with Edward Capell - see above)
- Hans Capel (1936–2023), Dutch physicist
- Jeff Capel II (1953–2017), American National Basketball Association assistant coach and former college head coach
- Jeff Capel III (born 1975), American former college basketball player and coach
- John Capel (born 1978), American sprinter and college football player
- Mike Capel (born 1961), American former Major League Baseball pitcher
- Richard Capel (1586–1656), English nonconforming clergyman
- Thomas Bladen Capel (1776–1853), Royal Navy admiral
- Thomas John Capel (1836–1911), English scandal-ridden Roman Catholic priest
- Tommy Capel (1922–2009), English footballer
- Vivian Capel, sound engineer and inventor
- William Capel (died 1515), Lord Mayor of London and Member of Parliament
- William Capel (sportsman) (1775–1854)

== See also ==
- Capel (given name)
