= Daniel Fowler Cappell =

Scottish physician and pathologist

Daniel Fowler Cappell CBE FRSE LLD (28 February 1900 – 13 February 1976) was a leading Scottish physician and pathologist. He was a leading academic and also acted as pathologist to several prominent Scottish hospitals.

== Life ==
He was born in Hillhead, Glasgow, on 28 February 1900, the son of Robert Cappell, a pharmacist, and his wife Annabella Fowler. His early education was at Hillhead High School and Glasgow Academy, where he was dux.

He studied medicine and pathology at Glasgow University, graduating in 1921. He continued at the university as an assistant in the Pathology Department and was awarded a MD in 1929. He became a lecturer in 1928 and in 1931 received a professorship at St Andrews University. In 1945 he returned to Glasgow University as professor of pathology and continued there until 1967.

In 1958, he was awarded a Commander of the Order of the British Empire. St Andrews University awarded him an honorary doctorate (LLD) in 1966. He retired to Edzell in Aberdeenshire.

Fowler Cappell died in Stracathro Hospital near Brechin, Aberdeenshire on 13 February 1976.

== Family ==
In 1927 he married Isabella Audrey Griffin. They had no children.

== Publications ==
- The Blood Group Rhesus (1946)

== Positions held ==
- Fellow of the Royal Society of Edinburgh (1946)
- Member of the British Society of Haematology
- Member of the Pathological Society of Great Britain and Ireland
