= USS Wateree (ATF-117) =

Tugboat of the United States Navy

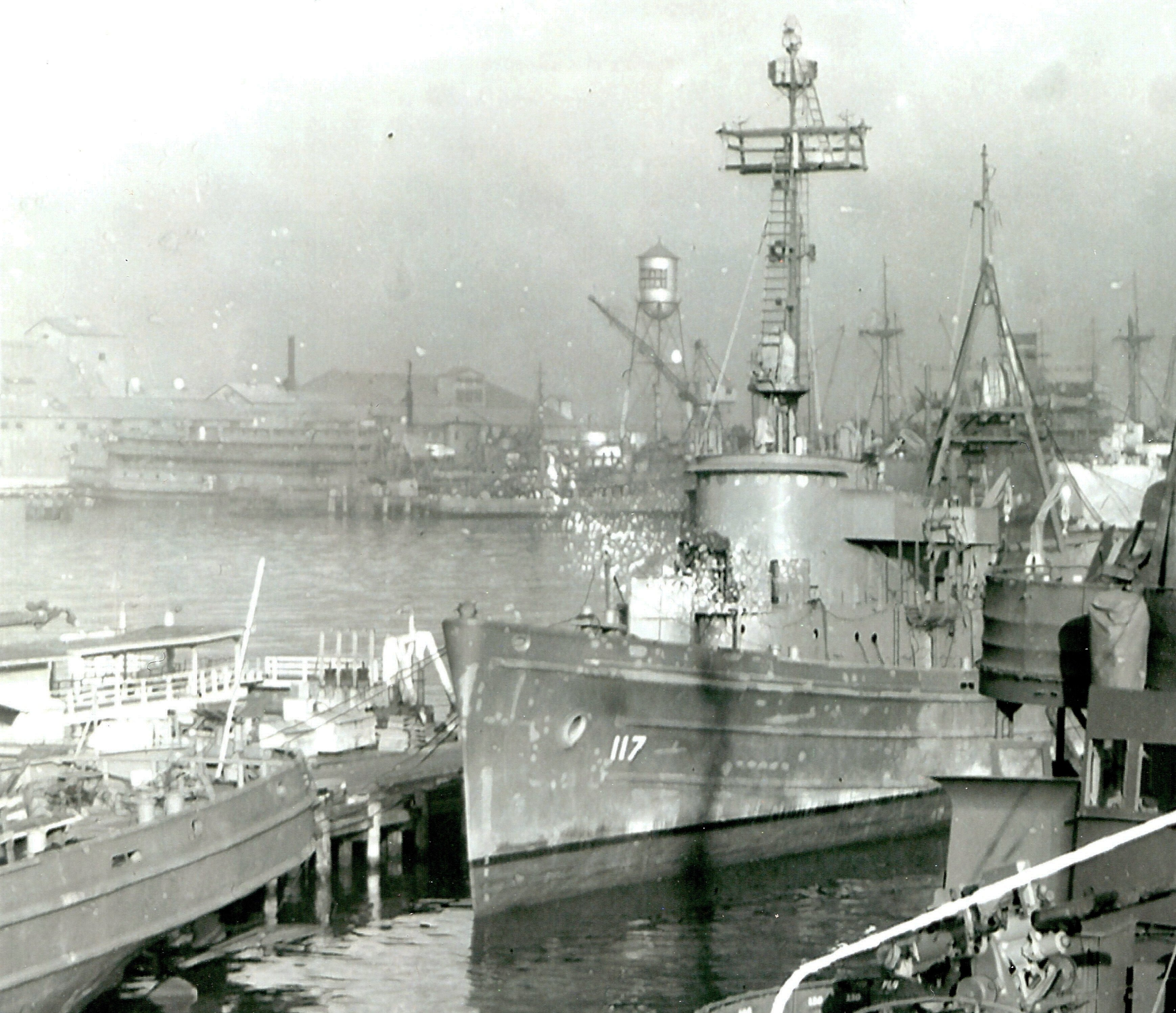
- USS Wateree (ATF-117) fitting out in December 1944

History

United States
- Name: USS Wateree
- Builder: United Engineering Co., Alameda, California
- Laid down: 22 September 1943, as Fleet Tug (AT-117)
- Launched: 14 June 1944
- Sponsored by: Mrs. Henry B. Wagner
- Commissioned: 17 February 1945 as USS Wateree (ATF-117) at San Francisco, California
- Decommissioned: 9 October 1945 (wrecked at sea)
- Reclassified: ATF-117, 15 May 1944
- Stricken: 1 November 1945
- Fate: Sunk during a typhoon, 9 October 1945 with a loss of eight crew members

General characteristics
- Class & type: Abnaki-class fleet ocean tug
- Tonnage: 1,330 tons
- Displacement: 1,689 tons
- Length: 205 ft (62 m)
- Beam: 38 ft 6 in (11.73 m)
- Draft: 17 ft (5.2 m) (max)
- Propulsion: diesel-electric, four Alco diesel main engines driving four General Electric generators and three General Motors 3-268A auxiliary services engines, single screw
- Speed: 16.5 knots
- Complement: 85 officers and enlisted
- Armament: one single 3 in (76 mm) gun mount, two twin 40 mm gun mounts, two single 40 mm gun mounts, six 0.5 in (12.7 mm) machine guns, two depth charge tracks

USS Wateree (ATF-117/AT-117) was an Abnaki-class fleet ocean tug acquired by the U.S. Navy during World War II. Wateree was sent to the western Pacific Ocean to perform towing services; however, during a typhoon, she was damaged beyond repair and lost with eight crew members missing.

== Built in California ==
The second ship so named by the U.S. Navy, Wateree (ATF-117) was laid down on 22 September 1943 at Alameda, California, by the United Engineering Company as an ocean tug, AT-117; redesignated a fleet ocean tug, ATF-117, on 15 May 1944; launched on 14 June 1944; sponsored by Mrs. Henry B. Wagner; and commissioned on 17 February 1945 at San Francisco, California.

== Pacific Ocean operations ==
After fitting out at San Francisco, Wateree got underway for San Pedro, California, on 4 March. She reported for duty at the Small Craft Training Center on 6 March and, for the next 25 days, trained strenuously. During the first week in April, she conducted more training, this time out of San Diego, California. From 6 to 13 April, the tug underwent repairs at the San Diego repair base.

She arrived back in San Francisco on 15 April and, on the 23rd, got underway towing three pontoon barges to the forward areas. The ship arrived in Pearl Harbor on 10 May and conducted voyage repairs. On the 22rd, she was put to sea to rescue a disabled freighter; found the ship on the 24th; took her in tow; and arrived back in Pearl Harbor on the 26th.

On 30 May, she stood out of the port once again towing the three pontoon barges. After a month's voyage, which included a five-day stop at Eniwetok between 18 and 23 June and a brief pause at Guam on the 30th, Wateree delivered the barges to Okinawa on 12 July. Two days later, she headed back to Eniwetok, where she arrived on 25 July. She remained there until 15 August, first undergoing some repairs and then providing harbor tug services in the anchorage.

== End-of-war operations ==
The tug's departure coincided with the Surrender of Japan ending hostilities in the Pacific. She steamed to Kwajalein where she took ARD-29 in tow, bound via Guam for Okinawa. She and her charge departed Kwajalein on 24 August, stopped at Guam from 2 to 15 September, and arrived at Okinawa on 23 September.

Six days later, she assisted several tugs with tows in trouble between the Philippines and Okinawa. On 1 October, she encountered Cinnabar (IX-162) adrift with ATR-29 standing by. Wateree took both ships in tow and arrived back in Buckner Bay on 4 October.

== Trapped by a typhoon ==
When it was ascertained that a typhoon would soon strike the anchorage at Buckner Bay, the tug received orders on 7 October to stand by to assist any ships which got into trouble during the storm.

Wateree herself, however, fell victim to typhoon "Louise" when it hit the anchorage on 9 October. At about 12:20, her starboard anchor was carried away by one of the many ships and barges cast about by the storm. To ease the strain on her remaining port anchor chain, she started her engines. Soon, however, she had to weigh anchor to avoid all the vessels adrift in the anchorage. The wind blew her afoul the anchor buoy for APL-28, and she was drawn in toward that ship.

She and APL-28 collided, but the damage was repaired quickly, and she untangled herself from the anchor buoy. Between 15:15 and 15:58, she cleared the APL and attempted to drop her port anchor again. The anchor machinery failed; and, at 15:28, the wind blew her onto a reef and battered out her starboard side before she could be brought clear.

At about 15:55, the order to abandon ship went out; and, by 16:10, all crewmen had gone over the side. Soon thereafter, Wateree sank in about 8 fathoms of water. The ship's commanding officer, her executive officer, and six enlisted men were lost. Wateree's name was struck from the Navy list on 1 November 1945.
