= Capewell =

Capewell is a surname. Notable people with the surname include:

- Bill Capewell (1878–?), former professional footballer, where he played in the Football League for Stoke
- George Capewell (1843–1919), American inventor, born in Birmingham, England
- Len Capewell (1895–1978), English professional footballer whose playing position was of a forward
- Luke Capewell (born 1989), Australian professional rugby league footballer
