= Upper Capel (disambiguation) =

Upper Capel may refer to:

- Upper Capel, Western Australia, a locality of the Shire of Donnybrook–Balingup
- Upper Capel Road District, the original name of the former Shire of Balingup
- The original name of Kirup, Western Australia
