= Sunshine Coast Theological College =

Defunct Australian Theological College

- Former names: Westminster Theological College
- Principal: Terry Clarke
- Location: Buderim, Australia; 26.7104°S 153.0564°E
- Website: www.sctc.org.au

Sunshine Coast Theological College (SCTC), formerly known as Westminster Theological College, was a Bible college in Buderim, Queensland which was affiliated with the Australian College of Theology until SCTC's closure in 2016. The college had offered a Bachelor of Christian Studies, an associate degree in Theology, advanced diplomas and diplomas. The principal was Terry Clarke.

SCTC was a multi-denominational Bible College that was Reformed in its doctrinal ethos. All of the faculty and board members subscribed to one of the following Reformed confessions of faith: the Westminster Confession of Faith, the Three Forms of Unity, the 1689 Second London Baptist Confession, or the Thirty-Nine Articles of the Anglican Church.
