= USS Climax =

Minesweeper of the United States Navy

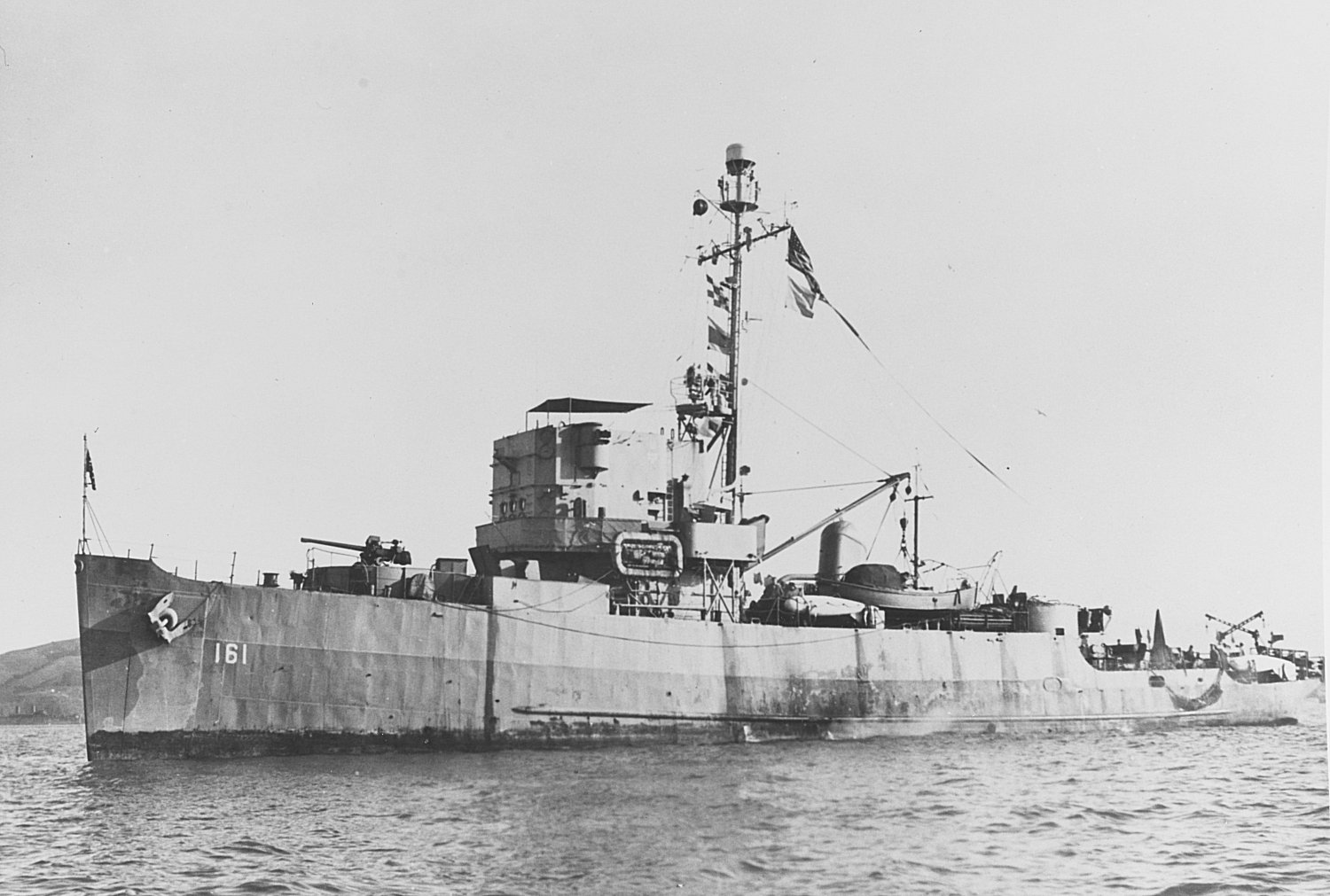
- Climax in San Francisco Bay, early 1946

History

United States
- Name: USS Climax
- Builder: Willamette Iron and Steel Works
- Laid down: 26 May 1942
- Launched: 9 January 1943
- Commissioned: 24 March 1944
- Decommissioned: 31 May 1946
- Reclassified: MSF-161, 7 February 1955
- Fate: Scrapped in 1959

General characteristics
- Class & type: Admirable-class minesweeper
- Displacement: 650 tons
- Length: 184 ft 6 in (56.24 m)
- Beam: 33 ft (10 m)
- Draft: 9 ft 9 in (2.97 m)
- Propulsion: 2 × ALCO 539 diesel engines, 1,710 shp (1.3 MW); Farrel-Birmingham single reduction gear; 2 shafts
- Speed: 14.8 knots (27.4 km/h)
- Complement: 104
- Armament: 1 × 3"/50 caliber gun DP; 2 × twin Bofors 40 mm guns; 1 × Hedgehog anti-submarine mortar; 2 × Depth charge tracks

Service record
- Part of: US Pacific Fleet (1944-1946)

USS Climax (AM-161) was an Admirable-class minesweeper built for the U.S. Navy during World War II. She was built to clear minefields in offshore waters, and served the Navy in the Pacific Ocean.

She was launched 9 January 1943 by Willamette Iron and Steel Works, Portland, Oregon; and commissioned 24 March 1944.

== World War II Pacific Ocean operations ==
From May to September 1944 Climax served as a school ship at U.S. Naval Small Craft Training Center, San Pedro, California. After brief overhaul she sailed on convoy escort duty to Pearl Harbor, Eniwetok, and Ulithi, returning to Eniwetok 20 December. Until 6 March 1945 she operated out of Eniwetok on convoy escort duty to Ulithi, Guam, and Saipan. She escorted a resupply convoy to Iwo Jima 13 March as fighting continued on the island, remaining on screening duty until 18 March. Returning to Eniwetok 29 March, Climax resumed her convoy escort duty to Ulithi and Guam and acted as training ship for submarines as well as aiding in the expansion of anchorage facilities at Eniwetok.

Following overhaul at Guam, Climax sailed for Saipan, Okinawa and Wakayama, Honshū, where she conducted sweeping operations from 11 September 1945 to 18 October in support of the landing of Allied occupation troops. She remained in Matoya Ko as a pilot vessel until 19 December 1945 when she cleared Nagoya for San Diego, California, arriving 16 February.

== Post-War Decommissioning ==
Climax was placed out of commission in reserve there 31 May 1946. She was reclassified MSF-161, 7 February 1955. She was scrapped in 1959.
