= USS Snowbell =

1943 Ailanthus-class American net laying ship

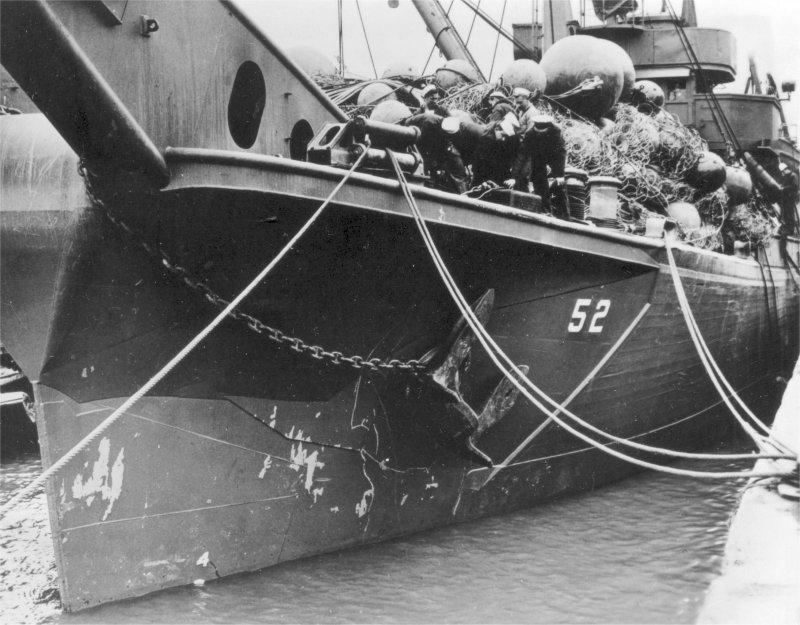
- Snowbell (AN-52) tending nets, date and place unknown.

History

United States
- Name: USS Snowbell
- Builder: Pollock-Stockton Shipbuilding Company, Stockton, California
- Laid down: 3 May 1943 as Snowbell (YN-71)
- Launched: 14 September 1943
- Commissioned: 16 March 1944 as USS Snowbell (AN-52)
- Decommissioned: 5 December 1945
- Reclassified: as AN-52 on 20 January 1944
- Stricken: 19 December 1945
- Honors and awards: one battle star for World War II service (Okinawa Gunto operation)
- Fate: Damaged beyond economical repair by Typhoon Louise off Okinawa, 9 October 1945; hulk blown up, 14 January 1946

General characteristics
- Class & type: Ailanthus-class net laying ship
- Tonnage: 1,100 tons
- Displacement: 1,275 tons
- Length: 194 ft 6 in (59.28 m)
- Beam: 37 ft (11 m)
- Draft: 13 ft 6 in (4.11 m)
- Speed: 12.1 knots
- Complement: 56
- Armament: One single 3 in (76 mm) gun mount; Three 20 mm gun mounts

USS Snowbell (YN-71/AN-52) was a Ailanthus-class net laying ship which served the U.S. Navy during World War II. She operated in the Pacific Ocean until she was destroyed by Typhoon Louise off Okinawa, 9 October 1945.

== Career ==
Snowbell (AN-52) was laid down on 3 May 1943 by Pollock-Stockton Shipbuilding Company, Stockton, California, as YN-71; launched on 14 September 1943; redesignated as AN-52 on 20 January 1944; and commissioned on 16 March 1944. Snowbell began her shakedown cruise from the San Diego, California, area on 16 April 1944. She was then ordered to San Pedro, California, to maintain the extensive harbor net installation there and also act as a training ship for the Small Craft Training Center.

On 24 December 1944, the ship entered the yard of Craig Shipbuilding, Long Beach, California, for alteration and refitting. Her main mast was removed and two 20 millimeter guns were added. On 27 January 1945, loaded with nets and moorings, Snowbell sailed for Pearl Harbor, Territory of Hawaii.

Snowbell arrived at Pearl Harbor on 6 February. A week later, she sailed for Ulithi, via Eniwetok and Johnston Island. The net tender remained there from 6 to 11 March; sailed for San Pedro, Leyte Gulf; and departed there on the 19th for operations in preparation or the amphibious assault on Okinawa Gunto. The net layer entered the anchorage at Kerama Retto on 28 March and began laying a curtain of nets to protect American shipping from possible submarine attack.

Snowbell tended nets at Kerama Retto until 15 May and then moved to Buckner Bay. On the 25th, she shot down her first enemy plane, a single-engine fighter plane, which crashed a few hundred yards from the ship. She continued operating in waters around Okinawa after the war had ended until early October. On 9 October, a typhoon with winds of approximately 150 miles per hour struck the area and Snowbell. Her stern anchor let go, and she collided with Chinquapin (AN-17) on the starboard side. At 1630, she went aground. On the reef only a few minutes, the ship's timbers began to break up. The ship was pounded by high winds and heavy seas. The next morning, the commanding officer ordered all hands to leave the ship lest she capsize.

On 30 October, an Inspection and Survey Board found the ship was unsalvageable. All equipment and stores were removed, and she was decommissioned on 5 December. Snowbell was struck from the Navy list on 19 December 1945, and her hulk was blown up on 14 January 1946.

Snowbell received one battle star for World War II service in the Okinawa Gunto operation.
