= Hans Capel =

Dutch theoretical physicist (1936–2023)

Hans Willem Capel (3 June 1936 – 7 April 2023) was a Dutch theoretical physicist. He was a professor of theoretical physics at the Leiden University from 1979 to 1983 and subsequently the University of Amsterdam between 1983 and 1998.

== Biography ==
Capel was born on 3 June 1936 in Sceaux, France. He obtained his PhD in mathematics and physics at Leiden University in 1965 under Sybren Ruurds de Groot with a dissertation titled: The hole-equivalence principle, the Van Vleck relation and the application to the theory of d-ions in Ligand fields. Capel subsequently became a lector of theoretical physics at the same university in 1970, and served as professor in the same field between 1979 and 1983. He then switchted to the University of Amsterdam where he continued in the same field and was professor from 1983 to 1998. He worked another three years at the university without reimbursement.

Capel is well known for introducing, in statistical physics, the Blume-Capel model, describing tricritical points. Apart from to statistical mechanics, he made important contributions to many fields of physics, especially in the theory of integrable systems (in particular discrete integrable systems) and dynamical systems theory. During his career he was doctoral advisor to 21 PhD students.

Capel was elected a member of the Royal Netherlands Academy of Arts and Sciences in 1990. He also served as editor of Physica A.

Capel died in Haarlem on 7 April 2023 after a short illness.
