= Vivian Capel =

- Born: 1930; Bristol
- Died: 13 July 2003
- Occupations: Writer, Bible translator, audio engineer
- Employer: Philips
- Notable work: Master in-car entertainment

Vivian Douglas Capel (1930 – July 13, 2003) was an English inventor, sound engineer, technical writer, Jehovah's Witnesses preacher, and Bible translator. He published technical books on sound systems, sound recordings, and applied acoustics with technical publishers in the United Kingdom. Capel invented a revolutionary loudspeaker system for public address systems (LISCA) as well as a hi-fi loudspeaker called the "Kappellmeister".

== Life ==
=== Work in electronics ===
He worked as an audio, television, and broadcast technician at various service companies, including Philips. Through this work, he gained experience in the fields of electronics and audio systems, as well as practical and consulting experience with large sound reinforcement systems.

Capel was also a violinist and played in several amateur orchestras. His involvement in both music and technology contributed to his interest in audio and acoustics.

Over a period of more than thirty years, he wrote articles for the trade press on topics related to audio and electronics. He also authored more than a dozen books on audio, acoustics, and related topics.

Later in his career, Capel worked full-time as an author and audio consultant, focusing on topics related to sound engineering and acoustics.

=== Translation of the New Testament ===
Capel published the 21st Century New Testament, which presented a more literal translation and a freer translation side by side in two columns. Features include the usage of "YHWH" and "Jehovah" in the main text, alternative renderings in brackets, and simpler theological expressions (such as "acquital" or "free pardon" instead of "justification"). Capel supplemented the translation with a book called Gems from the New Testament, which defends anti-Trinitarian renderings and criticizes the idea of Jesus' instrument of death being a cross.

== Writings ==
Technical books

- Capel, Vivian (1972). Creative tape recording. Fountain Press. ISBN 978-0-85242-106-2.
- —————— (1975). Audio on wheels. Newnes-Butterworths. ISBN 978-0-408-00190-8.
- —————— (1975). How to Build Electronic Kits. Fountain P. ISBN 978-0-85242-437-7.
- —————— (1978). Microphones in action. Fountain Press. ISBN 978-0-85242-512-1.
- —————— (1978). Radio Servicing Pocket Book. Butterworth. ISBN 978-0-408-00348-3.
- —————— (1979). Burglar alarm systems. Newnes Technical Books. ISBN 978-0-408-00405-3.
- —————— (1981). Public Address Handbook. Focal Press. ISBN 978-0-90726602-0.
- —————— (1988). An Introduction to Loudspeakers and Enclosure Design. Bernard Babani Publishing. ISBN 978-0-85934-201-8.
- —————— (1989). Security Systems and Intruder Alarms. Butterworth-Heinemann. ISBN 978-0-434-90211-8.
- —————— (1990). Public Address Loudspeaker Systems. Bernard Babani (Publishing) Ltd. ISBN 978-0-85934-237-7.
- —————— (1991). Acoustic Feedback - How to Avoid It (BP). Bernard Babani (Publishing) Ltd. ISBN 978-0-85934-255-1.
- —————— (1991). Loudspeakers for Musicians (BP). Bernard Babani (Publishing) Ltd. ISBN 978-0-85934-242-1.
- —————— (1992). Public Address Systems. Focal Pr. ISBN 978-0-7506-0732-2.
- —————— (1997). Home Security: Alarms, Sensors and Systems. Newnes. ISBN 978-0-7506-3546-2.
- —————— (2015). Audio and Hi-Fi Engineer's Pocket Book. Butterworth-Heinemann. ISBN 1-4831-0873-2.
- —————— (2016). Audio and Hi-Fi Engineer's Pocket Book (2 ed.). Newnes. doi:10.1016/B978-0-7506-0234-1.50011-6. ISBN 978-1-4831-0243-6.
- —————— (2016). Newnes Audio and Hi-Fi Engineer's Pocket Book. Newnes. ISBN 978-1-4832-9211-3.
- ——————. Master In-car Entertainment. Butterworth-Heinemann Ltd. ISBN 978-0-408-00286-8.

Literature

- 21st. Century New Testament. The dual translation which enables a study of the literal meanings of the original text to be combined with a reading in modern English. Translated by Capel, Vivian. Bristol: Insight Press. 1998. ISBN 978-0-9531877-0-6.
- —————— (1998). Gems from the New Testament. Bristol: Insight Press. ISBN 978-0-9531877-1-3.
