= USS Andres =

American WWII-era destroyer escort ship

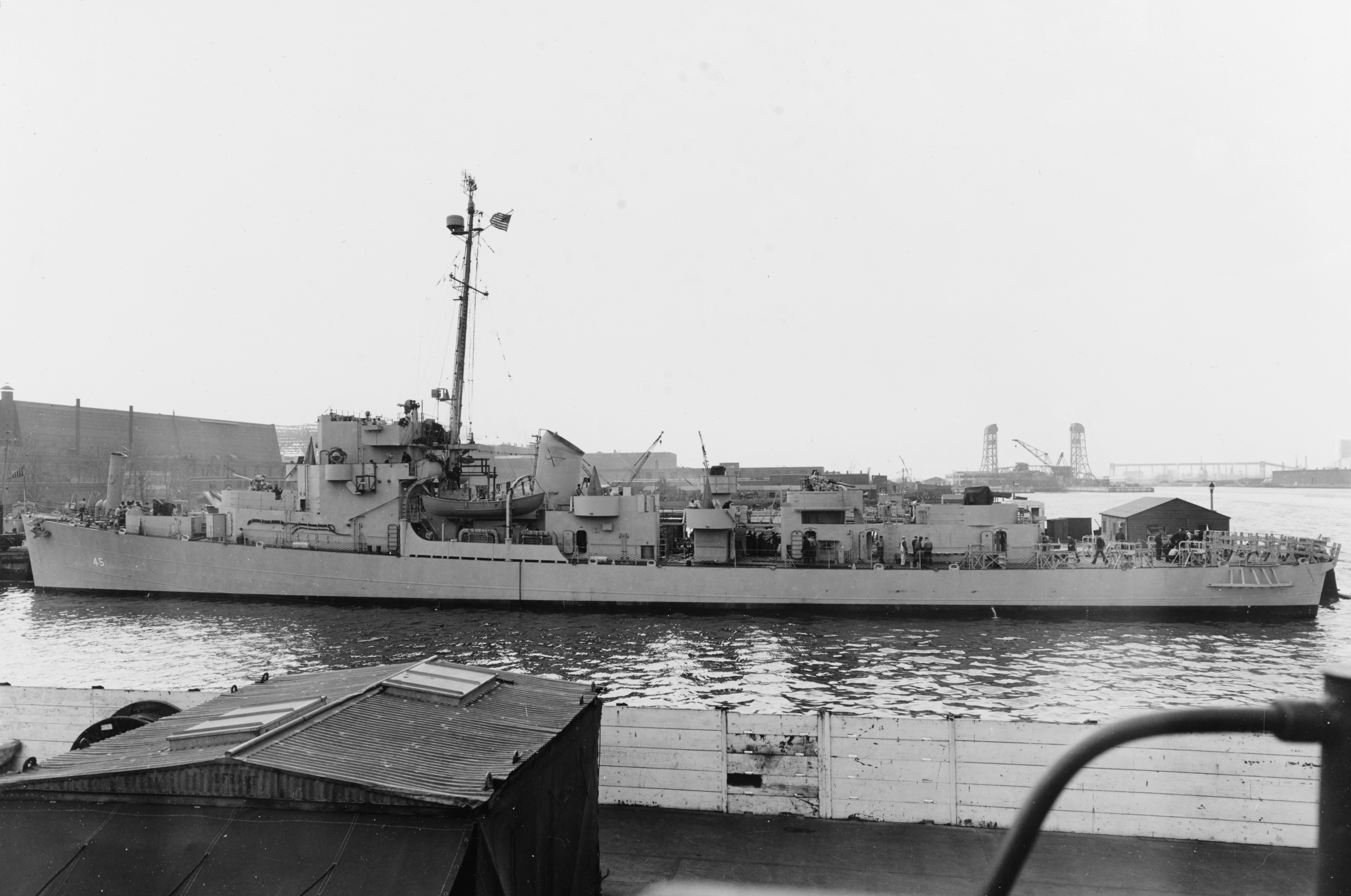

History

United States
- Name: HMS Capel (BDE-45)
- Namesake: Eric Theodore Andres
- Builder: Philadelphia Navy Yard
- Laid down: 12 February 1942
- Launched: 24 July 1942
- Sponsored by: Mary Elizabeth Schumacher
- Commissioned: 15 March 1943
- Decommissioned: 18 October 1945
- Reclassified: DE-45 25 January 1943
- Stricken: 1 November 1945
- Fate: Sold for scrapping 1946

General characteristics
- Class & type: Evarts class destroyer escort
- Displacement: 1,140 (std), 1,430 tons (full)
- Length: 289 ft 5 in (88.21 m) (oa), 283 ft 6 in (86.41 m) (wl)
- Beam: 35 ft 2 in (10.72 m)
- Draft: 11 ft 0 in (3.35 m) (max)
- Propulsion: 4 GM Model 16-278A diesel engines with electric drive, 6000 shp, 2 screws
- Speed: 19 knots
- Range: 4,150 nm
- Complement: 15 officers / 183 enlisted
- Armament: 3 × 3 in (76 mm) Mk 22 (1×3), 1 × 1.1"/75 caliber gun Mk 2 quad AA (4×1), 9 × 20 mm Mk 4 AA, 1 Hedgehog Projector, Mk 10 (144 rounds), 8 Mk 6 depth charge projectors, 2 Mk 9 depth charge tracks

USS Andres (DE-45) was an Evarts-class destroyer escort constructed for the United States Navy during World War II. Sent off to the dangerous waters of the North Atlantic Ocean during the Battle of the Atlantic to protect convoys and other ships from Nazi Germany's Kriegsmarine U-boats and fighter aircraft, Andres performed escort and anti-submarine operations.

== Design ==
The Evarts-class destroyer escorts were 289 ft 5 in (88.21 m) long overall, and they had a beam of 35 ft 2 in (10.72 m). They had an average draft of 10 ft 1 in (3.07 m) at their full load displacement of 1,416 long tons (1,439 t). Each ship had a normal crew numbered 156 officers and sailors.

Evarts was propelled by a pair of diesel motors manufactured by General Motors, which drove a pair of screw propellers. Her propulsion system was rated to produce 6,000 brake horsepower (4,500 kW) for a top speed of 19.5 knots (36.1 km/h; 22.4 mph). During her initial speed trials, Andres made 20.95 knots (38.80 km/h; 24.11 mph) from 5,870 bhp (4,380 kW). Oil storage amounted to between 131 and 197 long tons (133 and 200 t), which allowed a cruising radius of up to 6,000 nautical miles (11,000 km; 6,900 mi) at an economical pace of 10 knots (19 km/h; 12 mph).

The ship's armament consisted of a main battery of three 3-inch (76 mm) /50-caliber guns in individual pivot mounts, which could be used against air or surface targets. These were supported by a light anti-aircraft battery that initially consisted of four 1.1 in (28 mm) /75-caliber guns in a quadruple mount and nine 20 mm (0.79 in) Oerlikon guns. For attacks against submarines, the ship was equipped with a Hedgehog mortar, eight depth charge throwers, and two depth charge racks.

== Service history ==
Andres was originally built as HMS Capel (BDE-45) for the United Kingdom, allocated to the Royal Navy under Lend-Lease. Laid down on 12 February 1942 by the Philadelphia Navy Yard; launched on 24 July 1942. The ship was reclassified to DE-45 on 25 January 1943 when the ship was reallocated to the United States Navy, and was then renamed Andres on 4 March 1943. The ship's namesake, Eric Andres, was killed during the Battle of Savo Island on 9 August 1942. Andres was commissioned at her builders' yard on 15 March 1943. After fitting out, undergoing post-commissioning alterations, and completing acceptance trials, Andres proceeded to Bermuda, whence she carried out her shakedown from 12 April to 3 May.

Upon completion of this training, she sailed for Philadelphia, Pennsylvania, on 3 May. While in the course of her homeward voyage, at 19:13 the following day, she sighted red signal rockets off her port bow. Two minutes later she went to general quarters, changing course toward the direction of the rockets. Soon thereafter, she spotted a dinghy, awash in the sea, containing four men, 1,500 yards off her port bow, and three life rafts lashed together about 1,000 yards beyond. Andres then steered various courses and speeds, picking up men from the water; these proved to be the 31 survivors (28 merchant seamen and three members of the Navy armed guard detachment) of USAT Oneida, which, after straggling from a coastal convoy en route from New York to Guantánamo Bay, had foundered and sunk in bad weather at 0213 on 4 May, some 70 miles northeast of Cape Charles. The men had drifted nine and a half miles since the sinking. Completing the rescue effort at 1950, and ascertaining from the survivors than no additional boats and rafts had gotten clear of Oneida before she had gone down, Andres then resumed her voyage to Philadelphia. She moored at the Navy Yard at 1257 on 5 May, and disembarked the 31 rescued men later the same day.

Following post-shakedown repairs and alterations, Andres then conducted further training off Rockland, Maine, and put out of New London, Connecticut, before she proceeded to Miami, Florida, arriving there on 10 June 1943 for duty with the Operational Training Command, Atlantic Fleet. She then operated principally in the Florida Straits area as a school ship at the Submarine Chaser Training School (SCTS), Miami, Florida, indoctrinating student officers and nucleus crews, and interspersed this training with periodic overhauls at the Charleston Navy Yard, South Carolina, (19–29 March, 25 June – 1 July, and 16–26 October 1944).

Detached from that duty on 28 November 1944, Andres proceeded to New York, reaching that port on 1 December 1944, and reported for duty with Escort Division (CortDiv) 80 the following day. After refresher training out of Casco Bay, Maine, the destroyer escort then proceeded to Norfolk, Virginia, where she was assigned to Task Force 64. Over the next five months, Andres operated with CortDiv 80 and escorted convoys to Gibraltar and back. News of the German surrender reached her on 7 May 1945 shortly after she had conducted antisubmarine warfare exercises off Mers-El-Kebir in company with Edgar G. Chase, John M. Bermingham, and Doris, and had concluded a "rescue of survivors drill." Andres returned to the United States on 28 May 1945.

Following upkeep at New York, Andres conducted further training out of Casco Bay before she proceeded back to Miami, Florida, arriving there on 20 July. She resumed work as a training ship, this time with the Naval Training Center, Miami, Florida. Word of the Japanese surrender on 14 August 1945 found the ship operating south of the Dry Tortugas. Detached from the Naval Training Center, Miami, on 8 September 1945, Andres sailed in company with the other ships of CortDiv 80, and reached the Charleston Naval Shipyard on 9 September 1945 to commence inactivation. Decommissioned there on 18 October 1945, Andres was struck from the Naval Vessel Register on 1 November 1945. She was scrapped in February 1946.

== Awards ==
- American Campaign Medal
- European-African-Middle Eastern Campaign Medal
- World War II Victory Medal
