= USS La Grange =

1944 Haskell-class attack transport

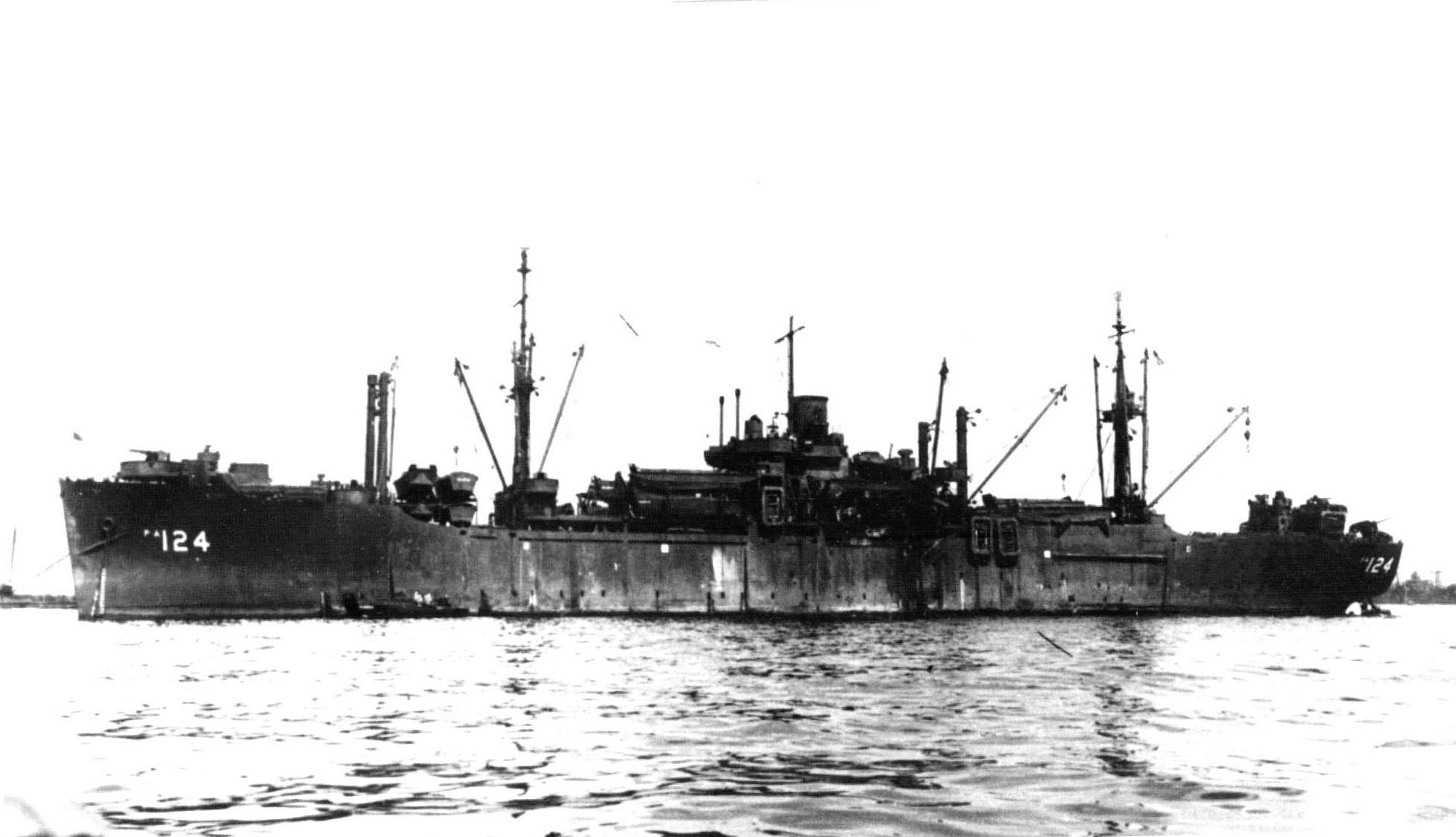

History

United States
- Name: USS La Grange
- Namesake: LaGrange County, Indiana
- Builder: California Shipbuilding Corporation
- Launched: 1 September 1944
- Commissioned: 1 November 1944
- Decommissioned: 27 October 1945
- Honors and awards: 1 Battle star
- Fate: Sold for scrap, 18 April 1975

General characteristics
- Class & type: Haskell-class attack transport
- Displacement: 6,873 tons (lt), 14,837 t (fl)
- Length: 455 ft (139 m)
- Beam: 62 ft (19 m)
- Draft: 24 ft (7 m)
- Propulsion: 1 × geared turbine, 2 × header-type boilers, 1 × propeller, designed 8,500 shp (6,338 kW)
- Speed: 17 knots (31 km/h; 20 mph)
- Boats & landing craft carried: 2 × LCM; 12 × LCVP; 3 × LCPL
- Capacity: Troops: 86 officers, 1,475 enlisted; Cargo: 150,000 cu ft, 2,900 tons
- Complement: 56 officers, 480 enlisted
- Armament: 1 × 5"/38 dual-purpose gun; 4 × twin 40mm guns; 10 × single 20mm guns; late armament, add 1 × 40mm quad mount

USS La Grange (APA-124) was a Haskell-class attack transport in service with the United States Navy from 1944 to 1945. She was scrapped in 1975.

== History ==
La Grange was of the VC2-S-AP5 Victory ship design type and was named for LaGrange County, Indiana. (Note: It is not certain how the ship's name was capitalized or if there was a space. Navy records are usually all uppercase, (i.e. LAGRANGE), while the usually authoritative on-line DANFS lists the ship as Lagrange. The current official spelling of the county name is LaGrange. The builders plate has "SS LA GRANGE" and on-line construction records have La Grange, so La Grange is used in this article.) La Grange was laid down under a Maritime Commission contract 26 June 1944 by the California Shipbuilding Corp., Wilmington, California; launched 1 September 1944; sponsored by Mrs. Albert Krutcher; acquired by the Navy 10 November 1944; and commissioned 11 November 1944.

=== World War II ===
After shakedown and amphibious training operations, La Grange departed San Diego 1 January 1945 for the western Pacific. Arriving Manus 18 January the attack transport carried cargo and passengers to Hollandia and the Philippines before joining Transport Squadron 17. Following a month of intensive preparations, La Grange departed Dulag Harbor, Philippine Islands, as part of the western islands attack group in the greatest amphibious assault of the Pacific war, the invasion of Okinawa.

Arriving in the transport area off Kerama Retto, 26 March, La Grange successfully landed advance forces who took that small cluster of islands which served as an advance naval base for fueling, repairs, and replenishment during the conquest of Okinawa itself. On 2 April, upon retiring from Kerama Retto, the convoy in which she was traveling was attacked by Kamakaze aircraft and is credited with the downing of one aircraft.

Private First Class Max Drucker, Company M, 306th Infantry (an embarked troop) was given credit for saving the U.S.S. La Grange from damage. Drucker was on deck near a 20mm antiaircraft gun when the surprise attack of 8 aircraft began. One of the Kamikaze planes approached the La Grange in a steep glide. Drucker leaped to the gun, got into action and directed an accurate stream of fire at the enemy aircraft. His was the only gun engaging the enemy. About 200 yards from the ship the plane veered suddenly and fell into the sea. La Grange remained off Okinawa for the next 30 days supporting operations on shore.

Returning to Saipan 5 May, La Grange sailed 2 weeks later with Navy passengers bound for San Francisco. She resumed war operations upon her arrival Eniwetok 11 July, and sailed for Okinawa 29 July. Arriving Buckner Bay 1 week later, La Grange unloaded cargo needed for the final days of the war. While anchored in Buckner Bay 13 August, she came under enemy air attack and suffered the last known kamikaze attacks of the war.

Despite accurate antiaircraft fire, an unidentified kamikaze carrying a 500-pound bomb crashed into La Grange's superstructure. A second suicide plane struck the top of a kingpost and splashed 20 yards from the ship. The transport suffered considerable damage in both strikes, with 21 sailors killed and 89 wounded.

After hostilities ended 15 August, La Grange did field repairs and prepared for the cruise home. Departing Guam 6 September, she arrived San Francisco 21 September. Because of the remaining battle damage, La Grange decommissioned there 27 October 1945 and was returned to the War Shipping Administration for transfer back to her original owner. She was placed in the National Defense Reserve Fleet at Suisun Bay, California.

=== Fate ===
In 1955 La Grange was withdrawn from the Reserve Fleet as part of a Repair Program, GAA Coastwise Line, and then returned. On 18 April 1975 she was sold to Nicolai Joffe Corp., for $208,489.78, to be scrapped. At 1130 PDT, on 21 May 1975 she was withdrawn from the Reserve Fleet and sent to the breaker's yard.

== Awards ==
La Grange received one battle star for World War II service.
