= Capel (given name) =

The given name Capel may refer to:

- Capel Berrow (1716–1782), English theologian
- Capel Boake (1889–1944), Australian writer
- Capel Bond (1730–1790), English organist and composer
- Capel Brunker (1898–1988), British Olympian
- Capel Hanbury (1707–1765), member of parliament
- Capel Lofft (1751–1824), English lawyer, minor political figure and writer
- Capel Luckyn (1622–680), English politician and Member of Parliament
- Capel Pownall (1868–1933), British Olympian
- Capel Wiseman, Anglo-Irish bishop
- Sir Capel Molyneux, 3rd Baronet (1717–1779), Irish politician
- Sir Henry Capel Lofft Holden (1856–1937), British engineer and Army officer
