= United Concrete Pipe Corporation =

Shipyard in Long Beach, California, United States

Coordinates: 33.772219°N 118.222686°W

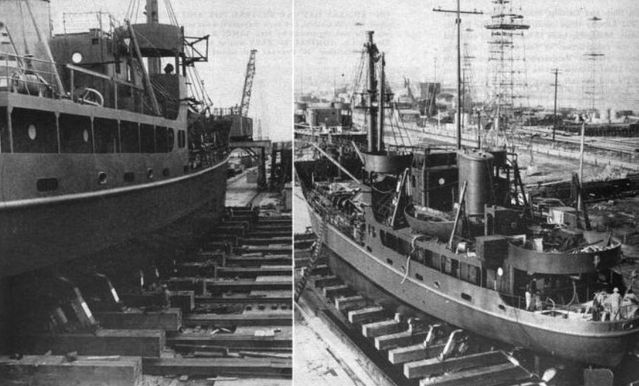
United Concrete Pipe in Long Beach at Berth 83 in 1944

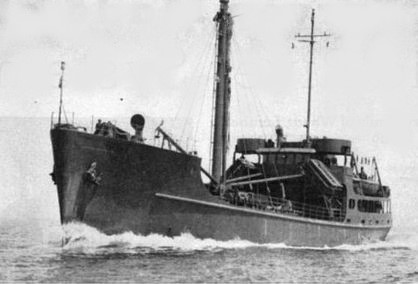
US Army ship by United Concrete Pipe

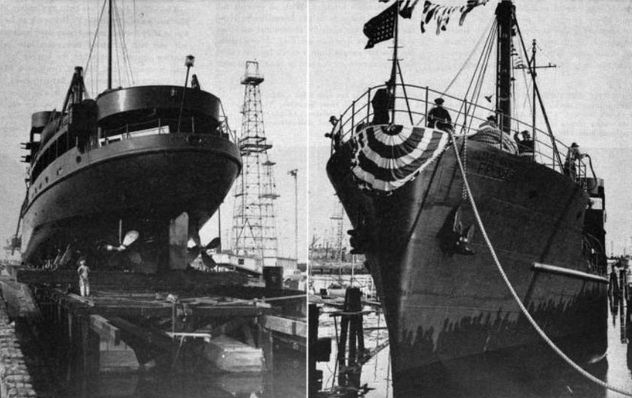
New US Army ship by United Concrete Pipe

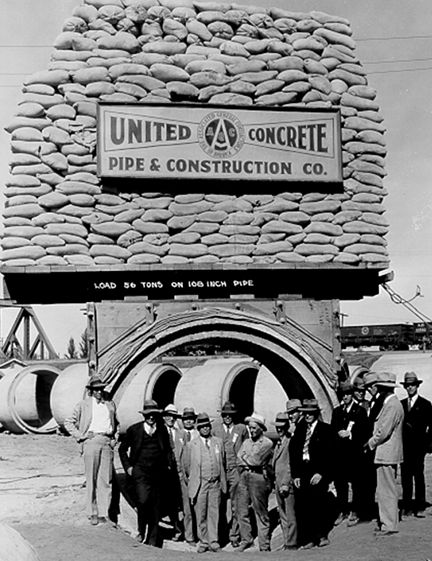
United Concrete Pipe showing off product

United Concrete Pipe Corporation was a manufacturing and construction company based in Southern California. It was in the business of constructing and installing concrete water pipes for irrigation, water lines, sewers, and drains, and after 1930 expanded into general construction, building concrete bridges, tunnels, concrete roads, and building foundations. United Concrete Pipe was established in 1919 in Ventura, California, by (Thomas) Tom P. Polich. In 1924 Steve Kral and B. J. Ukropina became partners with Polich. Tom Polich was born on March 22, 1888, in Serbia and came to the US in 1905. Polich worked for a concrete company in Van Nuys, California, before starting his own company. His first contract was installing a irrigation system in Tuttle, California. In the 1930s under the Works Progress Administration the company grew to nine plants and became a general contractor, not just a pipe company. Plants were in California, Texas and New Mexico. In 1953 the three started a new parallel joint venture Ukropina-Polich-Kral of San Gabriel, a general contractor company. United Concrete Pipe Corporation headquarters was at 85th St. and Vermont Ave., Los Angeles, California. One Works Progress Administration project was the Wawona Tunnel built in 1933. In 1937 United Concrete Pipe completed a Works Progress Administration project the Mad River Water Supply Project in Eureka, California. United Concrete Pipe Corporation last plant closed in 1994, at Riverside, California.

In 1943, United Concrete Pipe established a shipyard division in Long Beach, California, to build small coaster ships for the US Army under the Emergency Shipbuilding Program. The shipyard of United Concrete Pipe was in Long Beach at Berth 83, at the north side of Channel 2, at the entrance to the channel. Unique to the boatyard was the assembly line railway the ships were built on. As the boat was built it would move down the rail track towards the water. The steel for the shipyard was shaped by United Concrete Pipe's Baldwin Park, California, plant. The Army ships were 176-foot, a beam of 30 feet, a draft of 8 feet, and were 935 tons loaded. Power was from two General Motors Cleveland diesel engines each with 500 hp. The first ship was complete on March 23, 1944.

== Ships ==
Name	Owner	Type	Tons	Length	Built	Notes
FS 387	US Army	Coastal Freighter	560	176	May-44	
FS 388	US Army	Coastal Freighter	560	176	May-44	
FS 389	US Army	Coastal Freighter	560	176	Jun-44	To the Philippines as Neptuno
FS 390	US Army	Coastal Freighter	560	176	Jul-44	To USN 1951 as Deimos (AKL 40), to Korea 1951, scrapped 1960
FS 391	US Army	Coastal Freighter	560	176	Jul-44	To USN 1947 as Hewell (AG 145), later AKL 14, sold 1960
FS 392	US Army	Coastal Freighter	560	176	Aug-44	
FS 393	US Army	Coastal Freighter	560	176	Sep-44	To the Philippines as Basilan
FS 546	US Army	Coastal Freighter	560	176	Sep-44	To China as Hai Who
FS 547	US Army	Coastal Freighter	560	176	Oct-44	To USN 1951 as Renate (AKL 42), to Korea 1951, scrapped 1960
FS 548	US Army	Coastal Freighter	560	176	Nov-44	To USN 1950 as AKL 32, struck 1961
FS 549	US Army	Coastal Freighter	560	176	Nov-44	To the Philippines as Corregidor
FS 550	US Army	Coastal Freighter	560	176	Dec-44	To the Philippines as Bohol
Tangier Island	Omega Protein	Fishing Vessel	538	166	1944	
Joan of Arc		Fishing Vessel	131		ca. 1946	1 shaft direct drive 805 hp FM 37-E-14 7cyl. 2 225 hp Atlas-Imperial 6cyl. aux
Star Kist		Fishing Vessel	131		ca. 1946	1 shaft direct drive 805 hp FM 37-E-14 7cyl. 2 225 hp Atlas-Imperial 6cyl. aux
Courageous		Fishing Vessel	131		ca. 1946	1 shaft direct drive 805 hp FM 37-E-14 7cyl. 2 225 hp Atlas-Imperial 6cyl. aux
Santa Barbara		Fishing Vessel	131		ca. 1946	1 shaft direct drive 805 hp FM 37-E-14 7cyl. 2 225 hp Atlas-Imperial 6cyl. aux
Alaska	Diehl Trust	Fishing Vessel	221	94	1947	

== See also ==
- California during World War II
- Maritime history of California
